= Money, Lies, and God =

2025 book by Katherine Stewart

- Author: Katherine Stewart
- Language: English
- Publisher: Bloomsbury Publishing
- Publication date: 2025
- Publication place: United States
- Media type: Print (Hardcover), e-book
- Pages: 338
- ISBN: 9781635578546
- OCLC: 1429656500
- Preceded by: The Power Worshippers

Money, Lies, and God: Inside the Movement to Destroy American Democracy is a 2025 non-fiction book by American journalist Katherine Stewart. The book investigates the rise of the anti-democratic movement in the United States by a coalition of ultra-wealthy conservative donors using enormous financial resources, conservative think tanks relying on propaganda, and far-right religious organizations—all working together to undermine democratic institutions and replace them with autocracy. The book is the third in Stewart's series on religion and right wing politics in the United States, preceded by The Power Worshippers (2020) and The Good News Club (2012).

== Background ==
American journalist Katherine Stewart writes about Christian nationalism. She began focusing on this topic in the early 2010s while living in Santa Barbara, California, where she became aware of a "Good News Club", an after-school Bible study group, being held at her daughter's elementary school to teach children fundamentalist, evangelical Christian beliefs. She discovered that the program was not based in her community at all and had no relationship with anyone who lived in her town, but was in fact run by a national group who sought to challenge the separation of church and state and opposed public education. This personal experience led Stewart to write her first book, The Good News Club (2012).

She continued to pursue this line of inquiry in The Power Worshippers (2020), which was adapted into the documentary film, God & Country (2024). After 15 years of research and attending conservative conferences around the world, such as those by Concerned Women for America, the Family Research Council, the Faith and Freedom Coalition (Road to Majority conference), and CPAC, she began to investigate the overarching nature of the anti-democratic, and ultimately, what she perceived as the destructive goals of the movement. She titled her new book Money, Lies, and God, because, according to Stewart, "Money", or wealth concentration, has eroded the foundations of the American political system; "Lies", or disinformation, have become a defining characteristic of the new conservative movement; and "God", or Christian nationalism, is its central doctrinal and ideological approach.

== Synopsis ==
The book is divided into 11 chapters, with an introduction, conclusion, and index. Four of the chapters deal with "Money", three with "Lies", and four with "God", although Stewart titles this section "Demons" instead, referring to the "demonization of the political opposition" by Christian nationalists in the title, as well as the literal language of "demonic forces" that both fundamentalists and political operatives use to attack anyone who opposes them. Stewart argues that billionaires and corporate-backed foundations fund organizations that promote deregulation, tax cuts for the wealthy, erode labor protections, and use religious rhetoric to mobilize working-class voters. This anti-democratic political movement promotes the idea that only "white, male, conservative Christians" have the right to govern, and everyone else has a "duty to obey".

Stewart places the main players of this coalition into five categories: funders (billionaires, donors), thinkers (think tanks), sergeants (activists, deniers), infantry (conservative voters, Trump supporters) and power players (leaders, politicians). Stewart notes that the funder class is religiously diverse and includes not just evangelicals, but also Catholics, Jews, and atheists. The Thinkers, as Stewart calls them, refers to the think tanks and people who speak for them, such as John Eastman of the Claremont Institute, who Stewart argues stokes the base with fresh injections of grievance politics.

According to Stewart, Christian Nationalism primarily thrives among the sergeants and the power players, and a portion of the infantry. Stewart uses the term "reactionary nihilism" (Note: "It is reactionary in the sense that it expresses itself as mortal opposition to a perceived catastrophic change in the political order; it is nihilistic because its deepest premise is that the actual world is devoid of value, impervious to reason, and governable only through brutal acts of will. It stands for a kind of unraveling of the American political mind—a madness that now afflicts one side of nearly every political debate.") to describe the New Right's overall approach to destroying liberal democracy and attempting to return the country to an imaginary Golden Age. The movement uses misogyny, relies on exacerbating racial and ethnic tensions, and favors the use of violence and force while ultimately rejecting Enlightenment values and even reason itself. Stewart argues that the United States faces its greatest threat since the Civil War, but there is a solution for those who choose to defend democracy: build coalitions, pursue progressive taxation, uncover the influence of dark money in politics, confront disinformation, strengthen the separation of church and state, protect and uphold public education, voting rights, and the court system, and fund institutions to protect democracy over the long term.

== Reception ==
Brian Tanguay of the Santa Barbara Independent praised Stewart for her extensive research on the Christian right and describes the book as "outstanding journalism" of the "highest order". Adam Gabbatt, writing for The Guardian, notes that Stewart spent years of research to uncover the powerful financial networks and forces which led millions of Americans to support Trump. In a review for Foreign Affairs, Jessica Mathews writes that Money, Lies, and God stands out for its in-depth reporting and clear analysis of Donald Trump's ascent to the presidency and the groups who brought him back to the White House. Jennifer Szalai, writing for The New York Times, praised the book for its in-depth exploration of right-wing ideologies, making note of Stewart's chapter on "Smashing the Administrative State", which outlines the radical right's strategy to privatize publicly-run government services.

Becca Rothfeld of The Washington Post describes the book as a loose collection of insights into the modern American right, calling it "an informative if discursive primer on the pathologies and paranoias of the coalition governing our country." Rothfeld notes that while Stewart's narrow focus on the elite organizational structure of the right wing movement is accurate, the book does not equally account for the "genuinely held sentiments" of the conservative voters themselves. John McMurtrie in Kirkus Reviews called it "an impassioned takedown of a 'militant minority'", while Publishers Weekly declared it "an urgently needed background on the 2024 election results".

== See also ==
- Democratic backsliding in the United States

== Bibliography ==
- Stewart, Katherine (2025). Money, Lies, and God. New York, NY: Bloomsbury Publishing. ISBN 978-1-63557-855-3. OCLC 1429656500.
