= Simon Kenton =

American frontiersman and soldier (1755–1836)

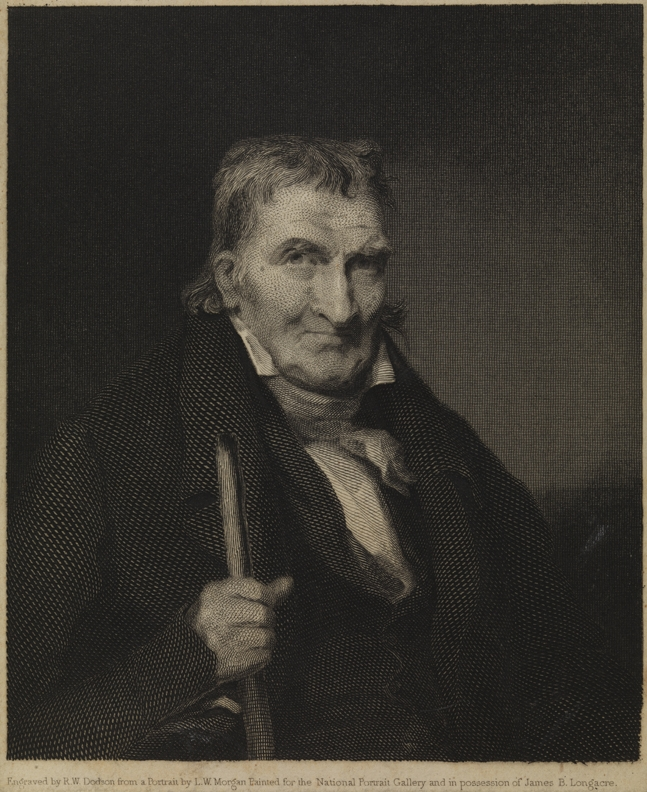
- Portrait of Simon Kenton by Richard W. Dodson, c. 1834
- Born: April 3, 1755; Prince William County, Virginia Colony
- Died: April 29, 1836 (aged 81); New Jerusalem, Logan County, Ohio
- Burial place: Oak Dale Cemetery, Urbana, Ohio
- Military career
- Allegiance: Great Britain; United States
- Conflicts: Lord Dunmore's War; American Revolutionary War; Illinois campaign; Northwest Indian War; War of 1812; Battle of the Thames

Simon Kenton (aka "Simon Butler") (April 3, 1755 – April 29, 1836) was an American frontiersman, soldier, and pioneer who played a significant role in the settlement of Virginia, Kentucky, and Ohio. He was a contemporary and friend of notable figures such as Daniel Boone, Isaac Shelby, and Thomas Hinde. Kenton served the United States in the American Revolutionary War, the Northwest Indian War, and the War of 1812.

He was captured by the Shawnee people in 1778, when they were allied with the British. He survived multiple gauntlets and ritual torture applied to war captives, and was said to be rescued by Simon Girty. He was later adopted by a Shawnee widow to replace her son and became a member of the tribe. His first son was born before any marriage; Kenton later married twice, and had a total of ten more children.

== Family and early life ==
Simon Kenton was born at the headwaters of Mill Run in the Bull Run Mountains on April 3, 1755, in Prince William County, Virginia, to Mark Kenton Sr., an immigrant from County Down, Ireland, and Mary (Miller) Kenton, who was of Scottish and Welsh ancestry.

In 1771, at the age of 16, thinking he had killed William Leachman in a jealous rage (the fight began over the love of a girl named Ellen Cummins), Kenton fled into the wilderness of what are now West Virginia, Kentucky, and Ohio. For years on the frontier, he went by the name "Simon Butler". After learning that his victim had lived, Kenton took back his original surname.

== Noted activities ==
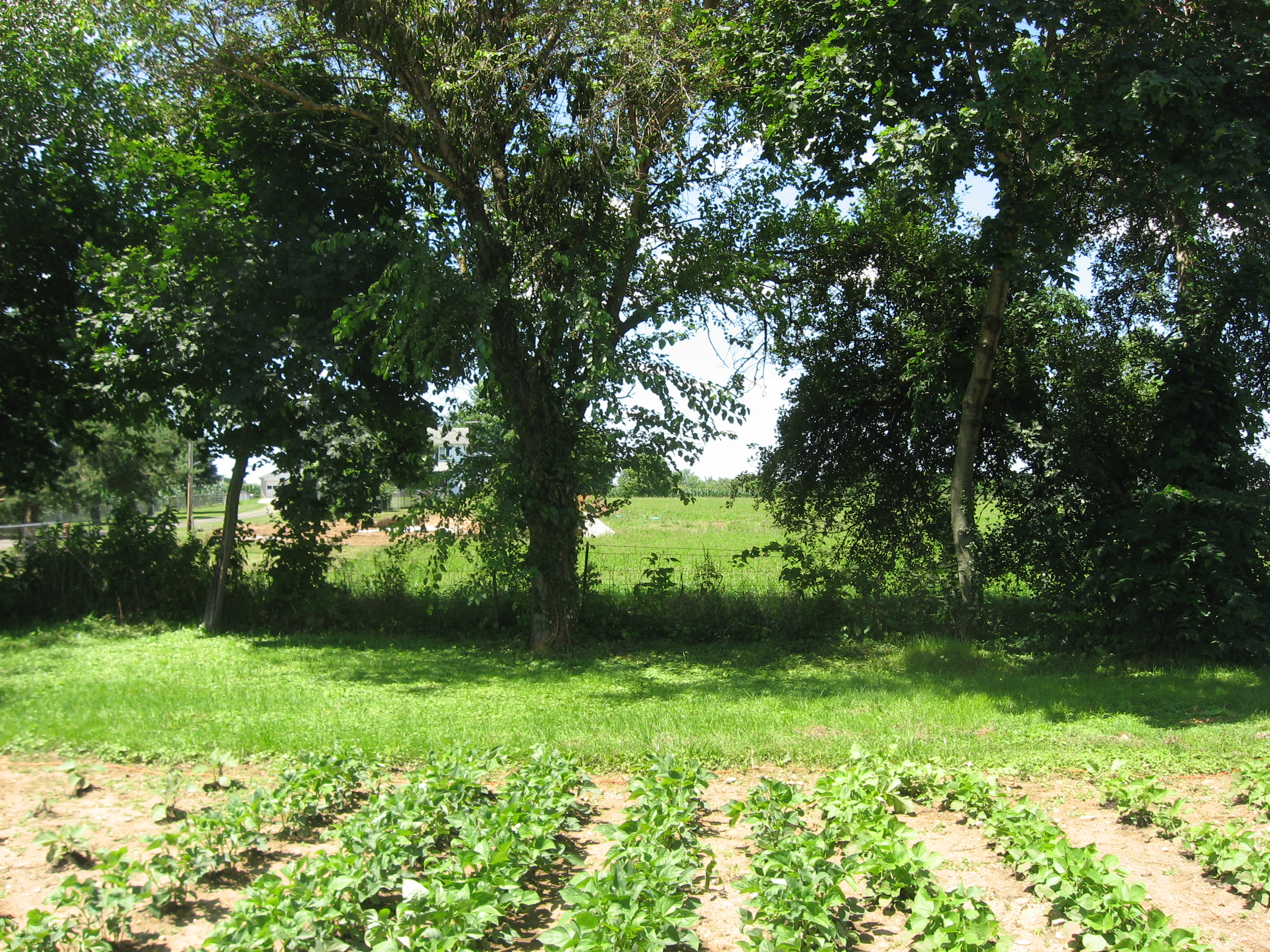
Site of the village of Chillicothe, where Kenton ran the gauntlet

In 1774, in a conflict later labeled Lord Dunmore's War, Kenton served as a scout for the European settlers against the Shawnee Indians in what is now West Virginia and Kentucky. In 1777, he saved the life of his friend and fellow frontiersman, Daniel Boone, at Boonesborough, Kentucky.

In 1779, 24-year-old Kenton was rescued from the Shawnee in Ohio by his former friend and scout Simon Girty. They had served together during Lord Dunmore's War. Girty, wanted for treason and declared an enemy of the state by rebel forces since June 1778, was living among the Shawnee tribe along with his brother James Girty.

According to historical accounts, saving Kenton was Simon Girty's only known time to save a white-man.

Years later, during a reinterment of Kenton's remains at Oak Dale Cemetery in Urbana, Ohio, William T. Coggeshall said about Kenton in 1779:

“But so black had the Indians painted their prisoner, that it was not until Kenton told Girty it was his once friend, that the renegade white recognized him. Girty threw himself into Kenton’s arms, and promised to do everything in his power to save his life.”

Girty called a new council of the Indians, and he persuaded them to release Kenton. Girty suggested the Shawnee take Kenton to a trading post at Upper Sandusky, where the British paid off their Indian allies. This gave them incentive to spare Kenton.

He made a speech to the Indians - He could speak the Indian tongue, and knew how to speak - and told them, if they meant to do him a favor, they must do it now, and save my life. Girty afterward, when we were together, cried to me like a child often, and told me he was sorry for the part he had taken against his countryman; that he was too hasty. But he was good to me; and it was no wonder. When we see our fellow-creatures every day, we don’t care for them; but it is different when you meet a man all alone in the woods - the wild, lonely woods.

There, he was saved by Pierre Drouillard, an interpreter for the British Indian department and father of explorer George Drouillard. The Shawnee respected Kenton for his endurance; they named him Cut-ta-ho-tha (the condemned man). He was "adopted into the tribe by a motherly woman whose own son had been slain."

Kenton served as scout on the 1778 George Rogers Clark expedition to capture Fort Sackville during the American Revolution.

Kenton started exploring the area of the Mad River Valley of Ohio and making claims as early as 1788. Kenton had first seen the area a decade before, while held as a captive of the Shawnee. He had vowed that if he survived, he would return. Independence did not mean an end to warfare; in 1793–94, Kenton fought in the Northwest Indian War with "Mad" Anthony Wayne.

But finally peace seemed to come and Anglo-Americans started migrating west. In April 1799, Kenton and his associate, Colonel William Ward, led a group of families from Mason County, Kentucky to an area between present-day Springfield and Urbana, Ohio. The Kentucky group settled there.

In 1810, Kenton moved to Urbana, Ohio. He was promoted to the rank of brigadier general of the state militia. He served in the War of 1812 as both a scout and as leader of a militia group in the Battle of the Thames in 1813.

The Shawnee chief Tecumseh was killed in this battle . Kenton was chosen to identify Tecumseh's body. But, recognizing both Tecumseh and another fallen warrior named Roundhead, and wanting to spare the respected chief from being cut up by soldiers for souvenirs, Kenton reportedly instead identified Roundhead as the chief.

== Marriage and family ==
Simon fathered a son (whom he acknowledged as Simon Ruth Kenton) with Christina Ruth in 1773. The couple never married.

Kenton married Martha Dowden and they had four children together. She died in a house fire.

The widower married Elizabeth Jarboe as his second wife. They had six children together.

Kenton died in (and was initially buried at) New Jerusalem in Logan County, Ohio. His remains were later moved to Urbana, Ohio. Later, his widow Elizabeth Jarboe Kenton and a number of their children moved to northwestern Indiana, to an area straddling Jasper, White, and Pulaski counties. It was settled by numerous other families who had migrated from Champaign County, Ohio, where Kenton is buried.

== Legacy and honors ==
=== Places ===
Kenton, the county seat of northwestern Ohio's Hardin County was named for him.

Kenton County, Kentucky, is named for him,

Simon Kenton Road is a residential street at the base of Bull Run Mountain in Prince William County, Virginia.

=== Schools ===
Simon Kenton High School in Independence, the county seat is named for him. Simon Kenton Elementary schools were named in Xenia and Springfield, Ohio.

=== Other representation ===
A statue honoring him was erected in Covington, Kentucky's Riverside Drive Historic District, overlooking the Ohio River.

Singer/songwriter Tyler Childers wrote the song "Middle Ground" in reference to Kenton and his expeditions.

Simon Kenton Trail connecting Springfield, Urbana, West Liberty and Bellefontaine, Ohio.

=== Organizations ===
Simon Kenton Post #20 in Elsmere, Kentucky, of the Kentucky Department of the American Legion, is named in his honor.

Scouting America has the Simon Kenton Council, a division covering central Ohio to northern Kentucky. The Simon Kenton Chapter is part of the Frontiersman Camping Fellowship of the Royal Rangers, Indiana.

=== Businesses ===
The Simon Kenton Pub is a small bar located in the Water Wheel Restaurant at The Inn at Gristmill Square in Warm Springs, Virginia.

The Simon Kenton Inn is an 1828 historic house and restaurant located near Springfield, Ohio. It is purportedly on land deeded to Simon Kenton by the U.S. Government circa 1800.
