= Boxberg (Gotha) =

Town in Gotha, Germany

Boxberg is a small town in the western Thuringian Basin about 5 kilometers southwest of Gotha, Germany.

The name means "mountain where sheep/bucks graze", as the older German spelling "Bocksberg" suggests.

The town is built on a hilly range which covers an area of five square kilometers. The federal highway (Autobahn A4) cuts through the middle of the town.

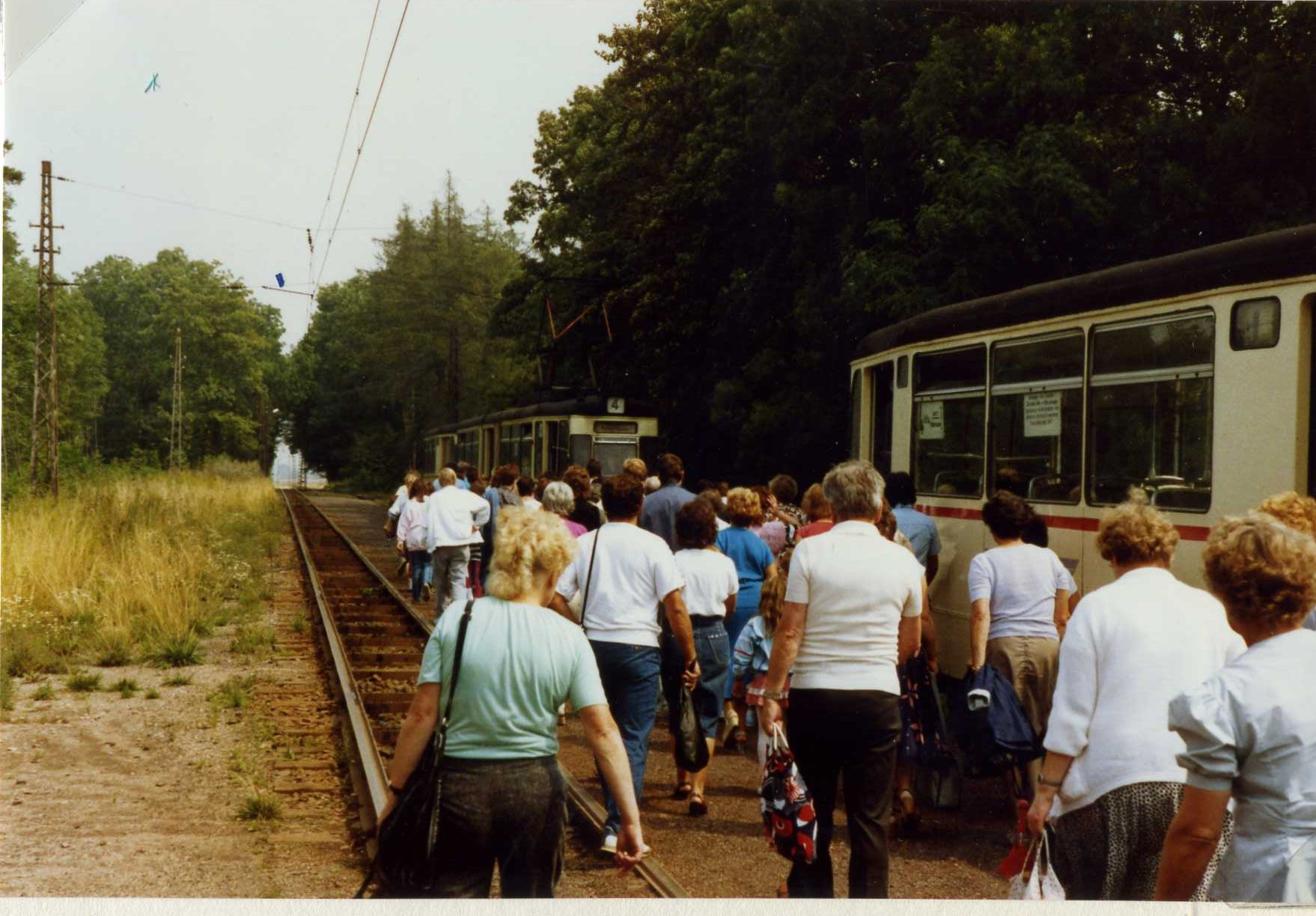
Forest railroad at Boxberg (Gotha) 1989.

The Thuringian Forest (Halle–Bebra) railway and the Leina Canal also run through the Boxberg area.

Boxberg is famous for its horse racing track, (a 19th-century English-style horse racing course) which is still in use today. In August 2022, the Royal Ranger (Christian scouting movement) had their Bundescamp with over 16,000 people camping on the racegrounds, including a temporary stadium built.

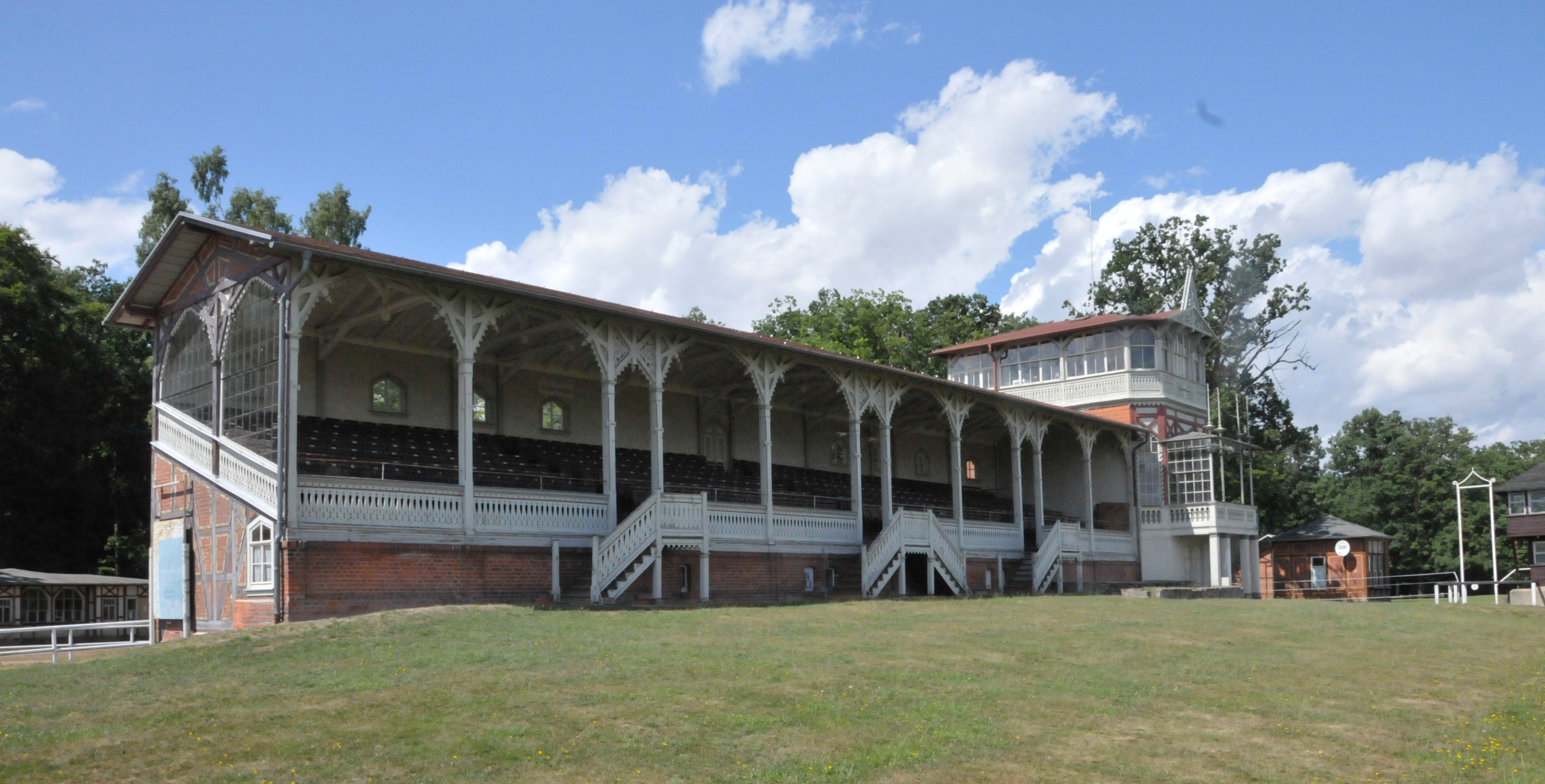
Racetrack Grandstand at Boxberg
