= Thomas Marcelle =

American lawyer (born 1962)

Justice of the New York State Supreme Court, Third Judicial District
- Incumbent
- Assumed office c. 2022

Cohoes City Court Judge
- In office 2016 – c. 2022
- Appointed by: Shawn Morse

Albany County Attorney
- In office 2012–2016
- Appointed by: Dan McCoy

Personal details
- Born: Thomas James Marcelle
- Political party: Conservative Party of New York
- Spouse: Elena Noto
- Children: 3
- Education: Bowdoin College (BA); Cornell Law School (JD)

Thomas Marcelle (born 1962) is an American attorney and judge from the state of New York. He serves as a justice of the New York State Supreme Court, Third Judicial District, having been elected to his post in November 2022. Marcelle previously served as Albany County attorney and as a judge of the Cohoes, New York City Court. In 2001, Marcelle argued and won Good News Club v. Milford Central School, a religious liberty case before the U.S. Supreme Court.

Marcelle has been nominated three times to be a judge of the United States District Court for the Northern District of New York. The first two nominations expired, and the third was withdrawn by President Donald Trump at Marcelle's request due to opposition from U.S. Senator Kirsten Gillibrand.

== Early life and education ==
Born in 1962, Marcelle is a native of South Bethlehem, New York. His father, Alfonse "Doc" Marcelle", owned Callahan Industries.

Marcelle received his Bachelor of Arts from Bowdoin College and his Juris Doctor, magna cum laude, from Cornell Law School, where he served on the Cornell Law Review.

== Legal career ==
In 1990, Marcelle served as a trial attorney at the United States Department of Justice. In that role, he worked on cases involving the Civil Rights of Institutionalized Persons Act. He has also served as a public defender, working under Doug Rutnik (the father of U.S. Senator Kirsten Gillibrand).

Marcelle ran for Albany County District Attorney as a Republican in 1993. His bid to unseat incumbent Sol Greenberg was unsuccessful.

In 2001, Marcelle argued and won a case before the U.S. Supreme Court. In that case, Good News Club v. Milford Central School, 533 U.S. 98 (2001), Marcelle represented a Good News Club in Otsego, New York. The Good News Club sought to allow elementary school students the right to meet after school in a public school building for Bible study and prayer. The Court ruled, 6–3, in favor of the Good News Club.

Marcelle was legal counsel to the Republican minority in the Albany County Legislature from 2002 to 2011. He has also served as senior counsel at Alliance Defending Freedom, a conservative Christian legal advocacy group known at the time as the Alliance Defense Fund.

In 2012, Democratic Albany County Executive Dan McCoy nominated Marcelle to the position of Albany County Attorney. The nomination met with "vocal condemnation from quarters of the county's LGBT, labor and progressive Democratic communities". Opponents of the nomination launched a website calling for legislators to vote against Marcelle, decrying his work with Alliance Defending Freedom. The nomination sparked "weeks of heated debate" about whether Marcelle's employment with "a conservative Christian group that opposes abortion and gay marriage should disqualify him" from the position. On February 13, 2012, the Democrat-controlled Albany County Legislature voted 27–10 to confirm Marcelle, whose supporters "dominated two hours of public comment" and described Marcelle as "a man who has dedicated his life to ensuring that people's rights are protected". He served as Albany County Attorney from 2012 to 2016.

In 2016, Marcelle took a position as Counsel to the Albany County Sheriff. Later that year, he left that position for a newly created job as a youth diversion activities coordinator. Marcelle made this move after having asked the state's Advisory Committee on Judicial Ethics whether his work with the Sheriff's Office created a conflict of interest with his part-time judgeship on the Cohoes City Court. The Committee found that holding both jobs would create an "appearance of impropriety".

As of 2018, Marcelle was a member of the New York Conservative Party. He is a former Republican. He became a member of the Federalist Society in 1990.

== Judicial career ==
=== State court service ===
In 2016, Marcelle was appointed as a judge of the Cohoes City Court by then-Mayor Shawn Morse. Marcelle began serving on the City Court in 2016 and remained in that post until his election to the New York State Supreme Court.

Marcelle was elected as a Justice of the New York State Supreme Court, Third Judicial District, in November 2022. The race was a close one, and was subject to a hand recount. There were three judgeships available and four candidates (three Democrats as well as Marcelle, who ran on the Republican and Conservative lines). Marcelle finished third, defeating the fourth-place candidate by less than 3,000 votes.

=== Failed U.S. District Court nominations ===
On July 31, 2008, President George W. Bush nominated Marcelle to be a United States District Judge for the Northern District of New York. The nomination was not acted upon due to opposition from U.S. Senator Charles Schumer of New York, who withheld a blue slip consenting to the nomination. The nomination expired at the end of Bush's second term.

Marcelle was recommended as a federal court nominee in 2018 by Congressmen John Faso and Lee Zeldin. In 2018, President Donald Trump nominated Marcelle to serve as a Judge of the United States District Court for the Northern District of New York to fill the seat vacated by Judge Gary L. Sharpe, who took senior status in 2016. On January 3, 2019, Marcelle's nomination was returned to the President under Rule XXXI, Paragraph 6 of the United States Senate. On January 23, 2019, President Trump announced that he had renominated Marcelle. Also on January 23, 2019, the American Bar Association unanimously rated Marcelle "well qualified"--its highest rating--for the judgeship. On August 29, 2019, the Albany Times Union reported that Marcelle had withdrawn his name from consideration "after his nomination was blocked by U.S. Sen. Kirsten Gillibrand over his opposition to abortion". The White House officially withdrew his nomination on September 19, 2019.

== Personal life ==
Marcelle and his wife, Elena, have three children and reside in Slingerlands, New York.

== See also ==
- Donald Trump judicial appointment controversies
