= The Good News Club (book) =

2012 non-fiction book by Katherine Stewart

The Good News Club: The Christian Right's Stealth Assault on America's Children
- Author: Katherine Stewart
- Language: English
- Subject: Good News Club; separation of church and state
- Publisher: PublicAffairs
- Publication date: January 24, 2012
- Media type: Paperback
- Pages: 304
- ISBN: 978-1-61039-050-7

The Good News Club: The Christian Right's Stealth Assault on America's Children is a 2012 book by American journalist Katherine Stewart about the Good News Club (GNC), a Christian after-school program which primarily targets students between the ages of four and fourteen in elementary schools in the United States. Published through PublicAffairs, the book examines GNCs, their formal structure and social organization, their literary goals, and the effects of GNCs on schools and surrounding communities since the U.S. Supreme Court ruled that public schools could not exclude them in Good News Club v. Milford Central School.

The book's final chapter focus on an overarching imperative to "defund and ultimately eliminate" the public schools by the Christian evangelical movement, according to Stewart. She calls the public school system "one of the largest and most successful collective efforts in [American] history" in her conclusion. Reviewers praised the research of the book while stating her writing at times could be hyperbolic and calling the book advocacy journalism. John E. Tropman of the University of Michigan's School of Social Work suggested the book as a part of sociology of religion courses.

== Author and background ==
The author of the book is Katherine Stewart, an American journalist and novelist who wrote for Rolling Stone, The New York Times, and The Village Voice at the time of the book's publication. She investigated the GNC when a club formed at the public elementary school her daughter attended, which led to the beginning of the book. Three years prior to the book's publication, Stewart published an article in the alternative newspaper Santa Barbara Independent which contained text identical to that in the book.

In May 2012, she published an article in The Guardian in which she compared the teaching GNC's parent organization, Child Evangelism Fellowship (CEF), of 1 Samuel (15:3), in which God commands Saul to destroy the Amalekites, to teaching a justification for genocide to schoolchildren. CEF responded that "[t]he goal of [CEF] is the proper teaching of this passage, which is not an instruction in genocide".

== Overview ==
The book examines the Good News Club (GNC), an after-school program which primarily targets students between the ages of four and fourteen in elementary schools in the United States, and the national goals of evangelical Christianity in and about public education. The book consists of twelve chapters and a conclusion. Chapters one through six focus on the social and formal organization of the clubs. In chapter one, the author examines a GNC form in an elementary school in the Ballard neighborhood of Seattle led by a volunteer school aid and members of an evangelical church.

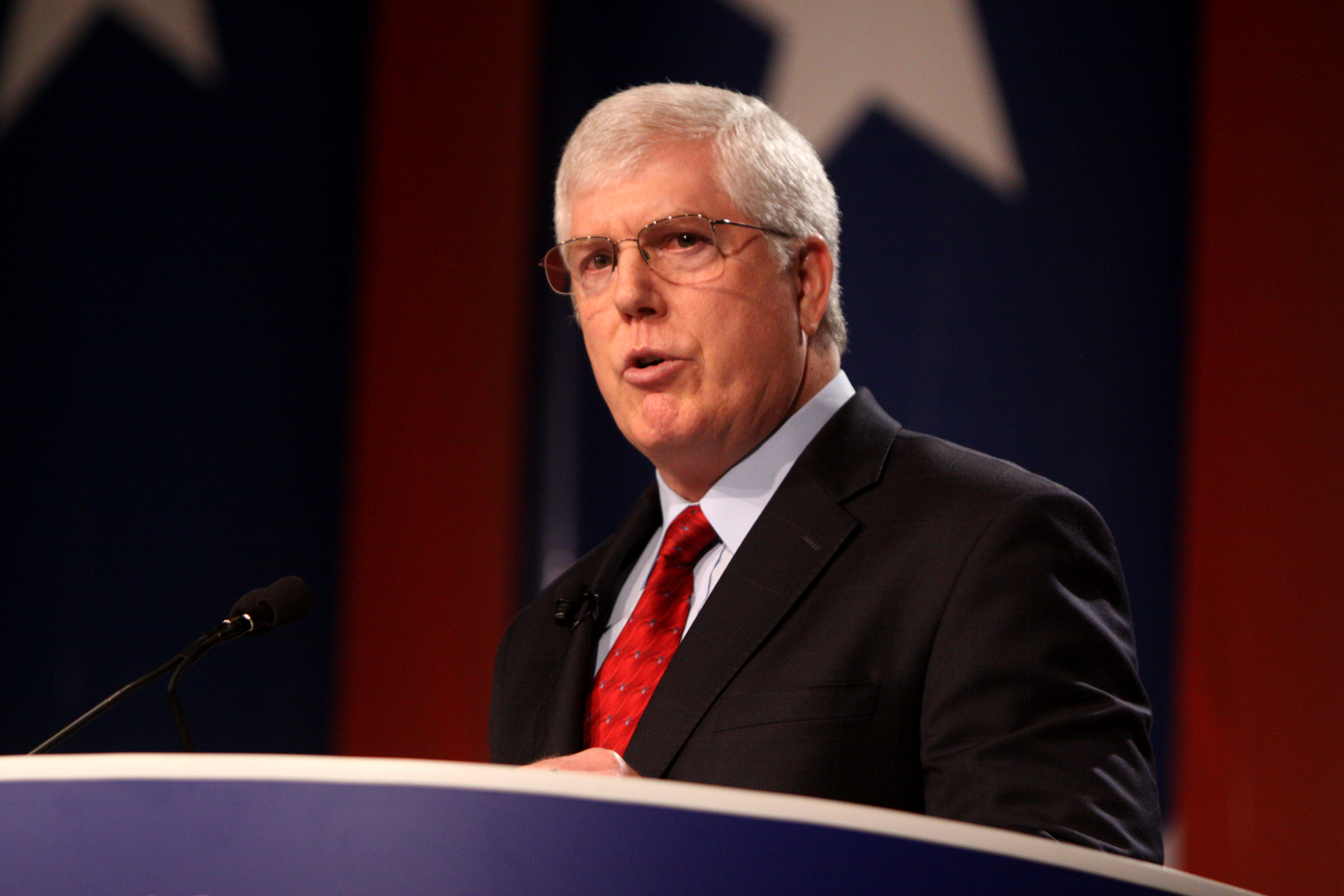
Mathew Starver (pictured), founder of the Liberty Counsel, is quoted in the book.

As the GNC takes hold in the elementary school, parents worry that their children are being proselytized to, and students and minorities at other schools at which GNC operates feel ostracized by the students in the club trying to convert other children. Stewart attends the triennial CEF conference, where speakers mention that GNCs grew from 16,805 children in 2001 to 139,221 in 2009, a 728 percent growth. Volunteers must raise approximately US$20,000 a year to open and maintain a GNC. In his keynote address, Mathew Staver, founder of the Liberty Counsel, states "if you want to change ... the planet, you want to focus on those children ages five through twelve". In chapter three, the author surveys the history of religion in public schools, examining historical events such as the Eliot School rebellion and the Scopes trial.

In chapter four, she examines organizations such as the American Center for Law & Justice, legal cases such as Good News Club v. Milford Central School, and conservative Supreme Court of the United States Justices including Antonin Scalia and Clarence Thomas. Moving to Manhattan in chapter five, the author uses her experiences of viewing a school rented by a church for use during after-school hours as a jumping board to view "planted" churches, in which the churches "operate independently, [but] typically maintain ties to an existing religious organization or network" and use schools after-hours for religious purposes. In chapter six, Stewart attends Mission Fest Seattle, where presenters explain how to instruct children on sin and Jesus, with an overarching theme on the 4/14 window.

Chapters seven through nine examine the evangelical movement's literary strategies; traveling to Texas, Stewart observes hearings of the State Board of Education (BoE) on which textbook policy for older children is voted. In chapter nine, Stewart focuses on Christian organizations in public high schools such as Success for Kids, an in-school program led by the Kabbalah Centre. In the same chapter, she focuses on sex education in public high schools, Christian views of human sexuality, and groups such as True Love Waits, who promote chastity among youth. In chapter ten, Stewart focuses on peer-to-peer evangelism through which students can persuade other students to adopt their religion, Christianity in high school sports and organizations such as the Fellowship of Christian Athletes.

Chapter eleven sees the author go through a GNC volunteer application, which requires adults to pass a criminal background check and abstain from unscriptual conduct. The book's final chapter examines an overarching imperative to "defund and ultimately eliminate" the public schools by evangelical Christians, according to Stewart. The author calls the public school system "one of the largest and most successful collective efforts in [American] history" in the book's conclusion.

== Critical reception ==
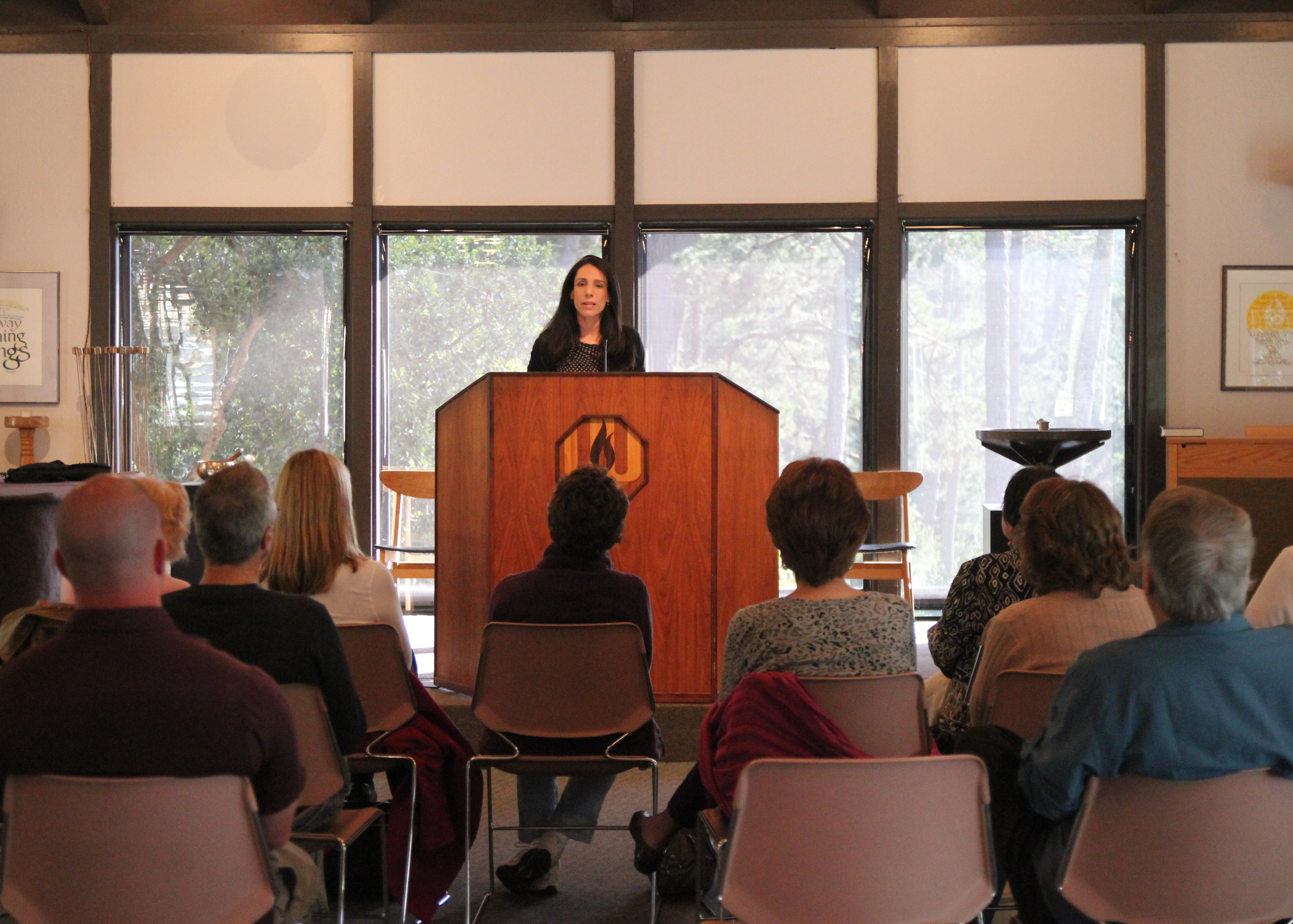
Stewart giving a lecture on The Good News Club in Monterey, California, in 2013

Reviewers of the book praised its research, while calling its language occasionally hyperbolic and more of a "call to action than to contemplation". Reviewing the book for the Minneapolis Star Tribune, freelance writer Alexander Heffner summarized Stewart's work as suggesting fundamentalist Christianity gained an undue influence in education, itself characterized as nonreligious. Heffner called Stewart a gracious narrator respectful of the persons she interviewed for the book, and the book "an important work that reveals a movement little discussed in the mainstream media". Kirkus Reviews called it "compelling investigative journalism about an undercovered phenomenon" though it also described the book as the strongest form of advocacy journalism. Publishers Weekly called Stewart's research thoughtful but her writing at times hyperbolic.

Howard B. Radest gave the book a positive review in The Humanist, praising in particular her writing style; associate professor of education at Anderson University Jeff Trotter described Stewart's writing style as easy in the Journal of Education and Christian Belief. Trotter summarized the book as painting an intriguing image of a Christian agenda, though failing to distinguish between individuals' goals locally and the goals of the national organization. He praised the book's research, and said given the combativeness and hyperbole in America around public education, it would be easy to dismiss the book as exactly that, though to do so would be mistaken.

In The Journal of Sociology & Social Welfare, John E. Tropman of the University of Michigan's School of Social Work examines the book in the context of "values imperialism" and states evangelical Christians may pursue such as outward indicators of inward grace, based on the assumption God would not let a saved person fail. Tropman then suggests the book useful in sociology of religion courses, and calls the book more of a "call to action than to contemplation". Writing for The Women's Review of Books, assistant director for the Center for Research on Women and Gender at the University of Illinois Chicago Veronica I. Arreola called Stewart's identification of whitewashing at a Texas school district astonishing and precise. Arreola went on to say that the book was not one that opposed Christianity or religion, but one that examined how GNCs waste public educational funding and try to upend the separation of church and state in the United States in public schools. David Austin Walsh of The Baffler described Stewart's 2020 book The Power Worshippers: Inside the Dangerous Rise of Religious Nationalism as a sequel to The Good News Club.

== See also ==
- Separation of church and state
