= Salvation bracelet =

Bracelet used as a tool of Christian evangelism

The salvation bracelet, also known as the gospel bracelet, witness bracelet, or wordless bracelet, is a bracelet used as a tool of Christian evangelism. The bracelet consists of a series of colored beads which represent key aspects of the Christian gospel.

== History and context ==
The bracelets are understood as part of a contemporary fashion for Awareness bracelets showing support for or identity with a particular group or theme, including the Livestrong wristband, ONE Campaign bracelets and Until There's a Cure bracelets.

A 1995 article referred to the bracelets as "Roman salvation bracelets", and described them as having been in use by Christians in Antioch in the 1st century. Other sources describe salvation bracelets as having evolved from, and as a variant of, the Wordless Book invented by the well-known 19th century British Baptist preacher Charles Spurgeon; they are sometimes referred to as the Wordless Bracelet.

The salvation bracelet is a popular tool used in evangelizing to children, understood as being in keeping with teaching technique of Jesus who is said to have used ordinary things familiar to his audience at that time, like fish, sheep and boats, as teaching tools. Following this model, modern day followers of Jesus similarly use items familiar to their current audiences. In the case of children, the use of a bracelet with attractive colored beads helps evangelists connect with and communicate the gospel to their young audience.

The most common form of the Salvation Bracelet consists of a series of colored beads stringed onto a cord and then tied to form a bracelet to be worn on the wrist. It may be pre-assembled, or it may come as a craft kit to be assembled by the child. There are other forms of Salvation Bracelets, such as the Silicone Salvation Bracelet and the Friendship Salvation Bracelet. These forms of Salvation Bracelets have the colors formed/woven into the bracelet instead of using colored beads.

== Bead colors ==
The key features of the Salvation Bracelet are the colored beads. As with the Wordless Book, there are several variations. Jefferson Bethke suggests that the usual order and meanings is as follows:

- Black to represent sin
- Red to represent blood
- Blue to represent baptism
- White to represent cleansing
- Green bead to represent growth
- Yellow to represent Heaven

Bethke criticizes this arrangement on basis that it starts with sin, whereas the Bible starts with God's good creation. Other writers object to using black at all, arguing that the color scheme reinforces racist associations of the color "black" with "sin".

The Child Evangelism Fellowship (CEF) version of the bracelet seeks to avoid these problems by starting (rather than ending) with heaven, and by avoiding the words "black" and "white":

- Yellow bead to represent heaven
- Dark bead to represent sin
- Red bead to represent atonement
- Clear bead to represent righteousness
- Green bead to represent growth

Other versions include purple as an additional color to represent worship.

== Use ==
Although some are made by professional jewelry designers, salvation bracelets are more often hand-crafted, and are worn as a symbol and a reminder of faithful seeking of God.

American churches often send them with evangelizing missions, both domestic and to other parts of the world. They are also distributed at congregation events, and sometimes hidden inside plastic eggs at the annual Easter Egg hunt.

Pastor Dan Bierworth of the St. Petersburg, Florida, Journey Christian Center explained that the Gospel bracelets his church gives out to children at Easter have "colored beads, and the different beads each show a different aspect of presenting the Gospel through the Resurrection story."

== See also ==
- Awareness ribbon
- What would Jesus do?
