= God & Country =

2024 documentary film by Dan Partland

- Theatrical release poster
- Directed by: Dan Partland
- Based on: The Power Worshippers by Katherine Stewart
- Produced by: Rob Reiner; Michele Reiner; Steve Okin; Dan Partland
- Starring: Russell Moore; David French; Phil Vischer; Skye Jethani; Simone Campbell; Jemar Tisby; William Barber; Kristin Du Mez; Andrew Whitehead; Rob Schenck; Charlie Sykes; Katherine Stewart; Andrew Seidel; Rob Boston
- Cinematography: Stefanos Kafatos
- Production companies: Anonymous Content; Castle Rock Entertainment; Oscilloscope Laboratories
- Distributed by: Oscilloscope Laboratories
- Release dates: February 10, 2024 (SBIFF); February 16, 2024 (United States)
- Running time: 90 minutes
- Country: United States
- Language: English
- Box office: $108,385

God & Country is a 2024 American documentary film directed by Dan Partland and produced by Rob Reiner. The film discusses the emergence of Christian nationalism and its close relationship with far-right politics in the United States, exploring its perceived threat to democracy and the politicization of Christianity. The documentary is based on Katherine Stewart's book The Power Worshippers (2020). It is distributed by Oscilloscope Laboratories.

== Synopsis ==
The film opens with Protestant minister and social activist William Barber II calling attention to the work of Martin Luther King Jr. and his curiosity about the commitment of American Christians to values like love, justice, and truth. The film then segues into the January 6 United States Capitol attack that took place in 2021, showing reactions from notable figures who remembered the incident.

Christian symbols, prayer, and religious language linked to Christian nationalism are shown to be closely connected with the attack on the Capitol and behind attempts to overturn the 2020 United States presidential election. Contrary to history, Christian nationalists believe the United States was founded as a Christian nation, with a divinely ordained role. They believe that laws and institutions should be based on biblical principles and political authority is legitimate only when it aligns with the "will of God". Critics note that Christian nationalism is a political identity that has more to do with the pursuit of power than it does with Christian theology.

Critics argue that Christian nationalism is a political ideology that only became popular in the United States when Christians faced opposition to running segregated Christian schools in the 1970s. As an organized political movement, Christian nationalism, critics maintain, is incompatible with the teachings of Christianity, which promotes humility and pluralism, ideas that Christian nationalists reject. Christian nationalists also oppose the separation of church and state, a position which threatens the future of democratic institutions and the very tenets of the religion itself.

== Development ==
The film is based on the work of author and journalist Katherine Stewart. Her nonfiction book, The Power Worshippers: Inside the Dangerous Rise of Religious Nationalism (2019) (Note: Stewart, Katherine (2019). The Power Worshippers: Inside the Dangerous Rise of Religious Nationalism. New York: Bloomsbury Publishing. ISBN 9781635573435. OCLC 1141734279.) concerns the rise of Christian nationalism in the United States and its close connection with right-wing politics which supports the politics of Donald Trump. Stewart signed with Anonymous Content. Steve Okin (who worked in the Christian film industry sector for Sony), whose brother, Jeff Okin, is a manager at Anonymous Content, brought it to the attention of Rob Reiner. Reiner read the book and brought Dan Partland on board.

Before coming on board as director, Partland worked on similar themes in his previous film, Unfit: The Psychology of Donald Trump (2020). Partland chose to work on the film because he believed that Christian nationalism threatened both democracy and Christianity: "The problem is the intertwining of a Christian identity with a political identity such that it can be hard to tell where one ends and the other begins. The danger to democracy led me to explore this topic, but what I learned in the process is that the threat may be even greater to the Church itself." Oscilloscope Laboratories acquired the domestic rights to the film in September 2023.

== Release ==
God & Country was shown at a private screening organized by the Baptist Joint Committee for Religious Liberty at the United States Capitol Visitor Center on January 11, 2024, followed by its world premiere at the 39th Santa Barbara International Film Festival on February 10, and its theatrical release on February 16.

== Reception ==
=== Box office ===
The film opened on the weekend of February 16, 2024, in 85 theaters and brought in $38,415 over an extended four-day weekend. It grossed a total of $108,385.

=== Critical response ===
On the review aggregator website Rotten Tomatoes, 88% of 26 critics' reviews are positive, with an average rating of 7.2/10. The website's consensus reads: "God & Country offers a chilling and bracingly effective look at political forces aligning in an effort to erase the barrier between church and state."

Frank Scheck of The Hollywood Reporter wrote, "It's not surprising that Dan Partland's documentary about the increasing influence of Christian Nationalism begins and ends with footage from Jan. 6., 2021. Christian Nationalists were among the principal organizers of the insurrection that occurred that day, which featured a trespasser carrying a Christian flag onto the Senate floor. God & Country, which counts Rob Reiner among its producers, delivers a bracing primer on the rise of this political movement that should thoroughly scare the large majority of American adults who don't embrace it."

== See also ==
- Bad Faith

== Notes and references ==
Notes
