= Gel bracelet =

Type of wristband

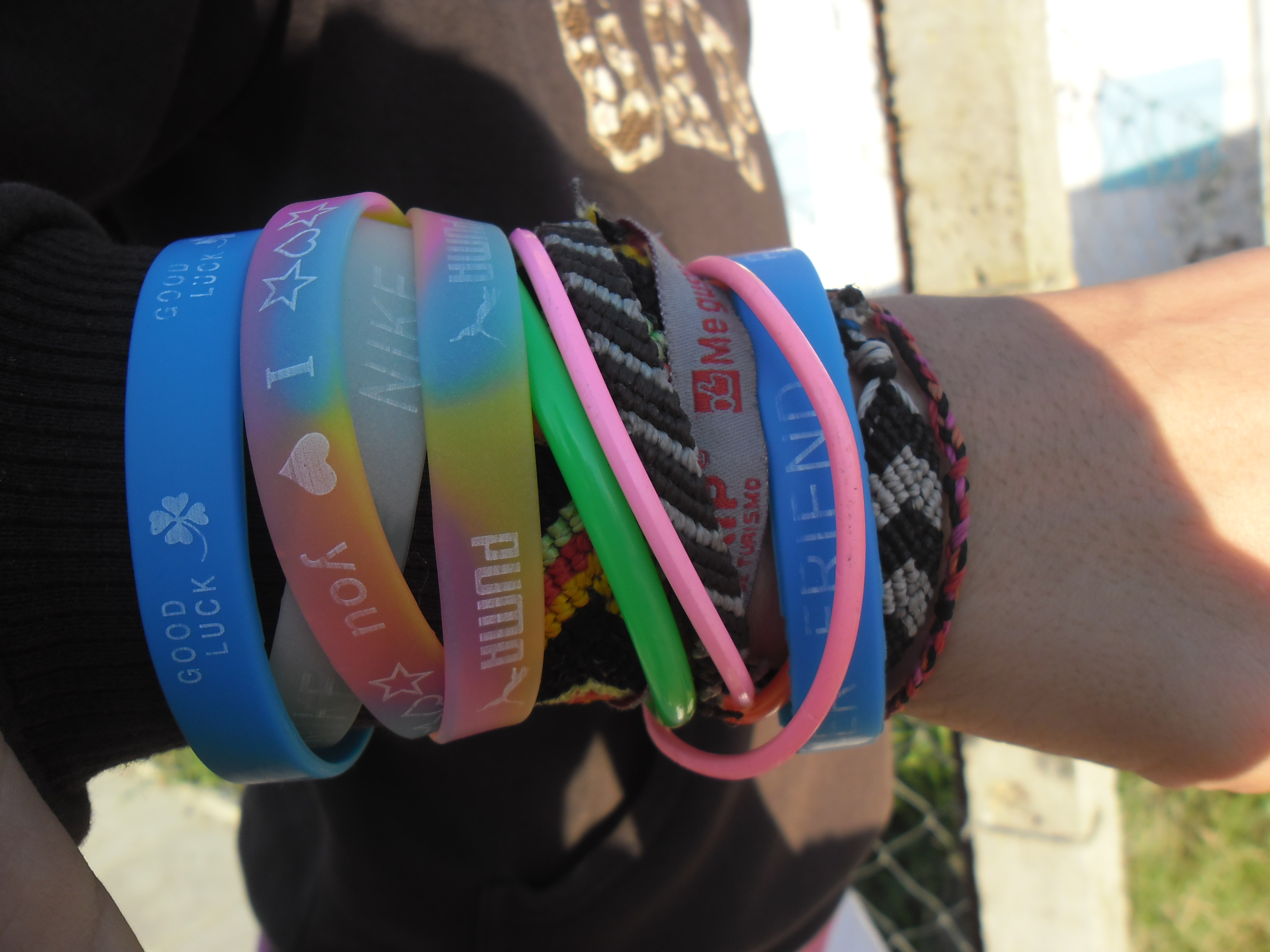
Flat and round gel bracelets, with braided friendship bracelets

Gel bracelets (or jelly bracelets) are a type of wristband often made from silicone.

== Gel bracelets ==
Gel bracelets usually have a rectangular or circular cross-section. They are stretchy and come in a variety of colors. They have been popular in waves throughout the Western world and elsewhere since the 1980s.

== Charity awareness wristbands ==
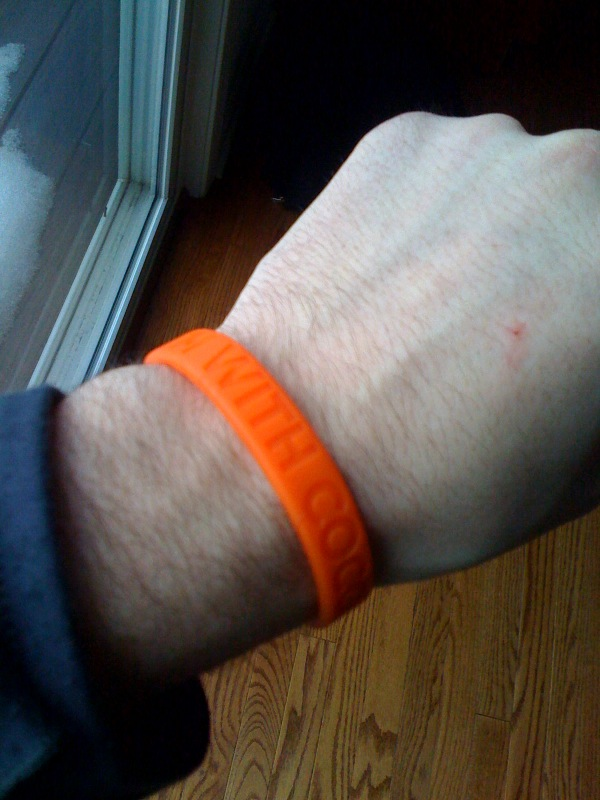
Livestrong wristbands popularized gel bracelets for charity purposes. This humorous example refers to the 2010 Tonight Show conflict.

Awareness bracelet wristbands carry messages demonstrating the wearer's support of a cause or charitable organization. The silicone wristband first became popular in 2004 with the Livestrong yellow band which was set up by American cyclist Lance Armstrong to raise awareness of cancer. Subsequently, a larger, 1-inch (25 mm) wide variety became more popular in 2007, with musical groups selling them to young concert fans.

The wristbands are often seen by young people as trendier than traditional charity pins. The wristbands have also become a popular tool used in fundraising, as both the wider and thinner bands are cheap to custom manufacture. The price of these wristbands varies depending on the particular campaign but is often $1 or £1, and the majority of the money usually goes towards the charity or cause involved.

== Sex bracelet urban legend ==
During a resurgence in popularity in 2003, gel bracelets became the subject of a widespread urban legend linking them to a supposed sex game, explaining their popularity among young teenagers. They were subsequently dubbed "sex bracelets". Different colors of bracelet supposedly represented different sex acts, indicating either that that wearer had performed or was willing to perform them. In the most common version of the legend, the wearer would perform the indicated sex act with anyone who was able to break a bracelet they were wearing. The legend became popular in 2003 in the US; by the end of the decade, when there was a second wave of media coverage of the legend, it had spread worldwide.

The sex bracelet urban legend can be traced back to the fall of 2003. An entry for "shag band" was posted to Urban Dictionary in September; by October newspapers in North Carolina and Florida reported on schools banning the bracelets, and Time magazine ran an article on the bracelets. In October 2003, the rumors were prominent enough in Alachua Elementary School in Gainesville, Florida that the principal banned the bracelets to avert disruption and inappropriate comments about them. They were subsequently banned in other schools in Florida and elsewhere. The effectors of these early bans did not insinuate that the rumors were true; however, some later media reports suggested that they may have been generating a moral panic. The British press reported on the supposed meanings of the band's colors in 2005.

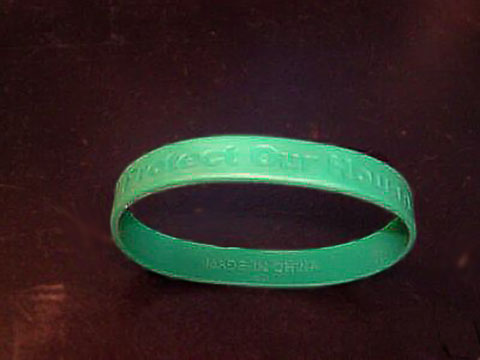
Countrywide Financial Corporation's Loyalty oath bracelet. In 2007, the consequence of not signing a loyalty oath was "lose my job".

Similar stories surfaced in the British media in 2009, in which the bracelets were allegedly nicknamed shag bands. Similar stories circulated widely in Brazil during the 2009/2010 summer, where the bracelets were referred to as pulseiras do sexo. In March 2010, a 13-year-old girl in Brazil was raped by three teenage boys after one of them snatched the bracelet she was wearing. The police stated that the crime was motivated by the use of sex bracelets.

Different versions of the legend associate different colors with sexual acts (similar to the handkerchief code). For example, purple might be associated with kissing, red with lap dancing, and black with intercourse. The associations between colors and sex acts varied between reports. The sociologists Joel Best and Kathleen Bogle found 193 different lists of colour–sex act associations, which included 48 different colours. Some colors enjoyed relatively wide agreement as to their supposed meanings: Bogle and Best found that black was almost always associated with sexual intercourse; on the other hand though cunnilingus was the most common act associated with the color green, fewer than half of the sources which included green assigned it this meaning.

Some versions say the sexual activity occurred at parties held for the purpose, making them similar to contemporary rumors of "rainbow parties", a gathering where girls wearing varying shades of lipstick supposedly take turns fellating their male counterparts, leaving an array of colors on their penises. Other tales of teenage sex parties have circulated at various times. Folklorist Barbara Mikkelson of snopes.com associates the "sex bracelet" stories with similar ones of the past. In the 1970s, pull tabs from aluminum cans and labels from beer bottles were supposedly considered "sex coupons" and obligated any girl presented with one to sleep with the bearer. By the 1990s, the rumors shifted to include an assortment of plastic items, including some worn as bracelets. Best and Bogle suggest a parallel to the game kiss chase. According to Mikkelson, there is likely little truth behind the stories, and the vast majority of teenagers who contact her site express shock and disappointment that so many have believed them.

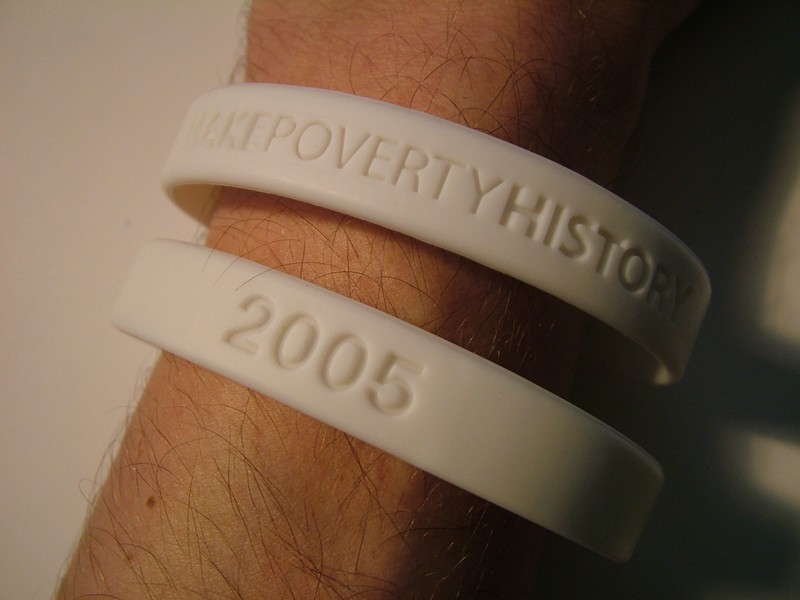
Make Poverty History white "awareness bracelet"

At least one type of gel bracelet called the MY Single Band was specifically designed to advertise the wearer's relationship status. The response to this bracelet was largely critical, with Natasha Burton of Cosmopolitan saying she doubted men would look for such a bracelet given that she was still approached even while wearing her engagement ring. The staff of Glamour were reportedly uncomfortable with the concept, and Eliana Dockterman of Time magazine even compared it to wearing one's OkCupid profile on their T-shirt.

== See also ==
- Awareness ribbon – developed to symbolize remembrance of service members and other causes
- Gospel bracelet
- Lockets
- Eye miniatures – mementos of loved ones c. 1785
- Lock of hair – memento dating to antiquity
- POW bracelet – from 1970 to 1976, engraved with name of an American serviceman captured or missing during the Vietnam War
- Wrist-band.com – American silicone wristband manufacturer
- Rubber band
