= Assembly of God youth organizations =

Christian youth organisation

Royal Rangers
- Established: September 23, 1962 (officially announced)
- Founder: Rev. Johnnie Barnes
- Headquarters: Springfield, Missouri
- Location: (National Address) 1445 N. Boonville Ave. Springfield Missouri, USA, 65802-1894
- Coordinates: 38°37′38″N 90°11′52″W
- National Commander: Karl S. Fleig
- Nat'l Programs Coordinator: John Hicks
- Nat'l Resource & Logistics Coordinator: JR Whinery
- Website: royalrangersusa.com

Assembly of God youth organizations
- Standard uniform colors for The Royal rangers

Assemblies of God youth organizations include two youth organizations operating under the auspices of the Assemblies of God, the Royal Rangers and the Mpact Girls Clubs (formerly known as the Missionettes).

== Royal Rangers ==
Royal Rangers is an adventure-based, merit-driven, faith-based, church ministry and mentoring program for boys in grades K–12, providing “Christlike character formation and servant leadership development for boys and young men in a highly relational and fun environment". The Royal Rangers program is active throughout the United States as well as in over 90 other nations; consequently, in 2002, Royal Rangers International (RRI) was started. Royal Rangers in the USA is a boys-only program, unless the church does not have a girls ministry program; programs in some other nations allow both boys and girls to participate. The uniforms, mottos, practices, and operation are derived from the Boy Scouts.

Royal Rangers' mission is to "evangelize, equip, and empower the next generation of Christlike men and lifelong servant leaders." (Formerly worded: To instruct, challenge, and inspire our boys in the areas of Bible doctrine, Christian service, moral conduct, and the basic beliefs of our church, through interesting activities that boys enjoy.) They also position themselves against the LGBT community and forbid members of that community to be a group leader, stating on their website: "This prohibition encompasses the advocacy and/or practice of both sinful heterosexual conduct and homosexual conduct, as well as the practice of transgender or altered gender identity."

The highest award in Royal Rangers is the Gold Medal of Achievement (GMA), which is promoted as the equivalent to the rank of Eagle Scout.

=== History ===
- 1960 Rev. Burton Pierce comes to Springfield, Missouri, as Men's Department Secretary. He helps develop "The Group of Brothers" — Burton Pierce, Lloyd Colbough, Charles Scott, Weldon Colbough, and Dick Champion — to pray for God's direction in the development of a new boys' program in the Assemblies of God.
- 1961 Rev. Pierce travels to Texas to meet North Texas District Christ Ambassadors President Johnnie Barnes. Rev. Johnnie Barnes is considered founder of Royal Rangers. Rev. Barnes's memorial tombstone states that he is the Royal Rangers Founder; the handbooks state he founded the ministry in 1962 as well.
- 1962 By January, Rev. Johnnie Barnes had moved to Springfield, Missouri, to start putting together a program for boys. Rev. Charles Scott suggests the name "Royal Rangers". Rev. Barnes becomes the first Royal Rangers national commander. The first pilot program is conducted at Webster Park A/G in Springfield, Missouri, with a second unofficial pilot program conducted at Bethel A/G (also in Springfield), using the same materials.
- 1963 The Royal Rangers Leadership Training Course is developed.
- 1964 The first district-wide "pow wows" — large annual camps — are held. The Gold Medal of Achievement and the Medal of Valor awards are first offered.
- 1965 Royal Rangers ministry started in Sydney, Australia.
- 1966 Royal Rangers ministries are set up in Australia and Latin America. The Frontiersmen Camping Fraternity (later Frontiersmen Camping Fellowship; FCF) is formed. The first Royal Rangers Week is held. It celebrates the Royal Rangers ministry and encourages reaching, teaching, and keeping boys for Christ.
- 1967 Royal Rangers Australia allows girls to be active in the program.
- 1968 National Training Camps for Royal Rangers leaders are held in four states: Missouri, Colorado, New York, and California.
- 1972 The first National Training Camps (NTC) are held.
- 1972 Chi Omega Rho is developed and launched as a college level Royal Rangers ministry at Central Bible College in Springfield, Missouri.
- 1974 The first National Camporama — a camping event that happens every four years — is held at the Air Force Academy in Colorado Springs, Colorado. Ministry established in Worcester, England.
- 1977 The National Royal Rangers Council is formed and meets in Springfield, Missouri.
- 1978 The second National Camporama was held in Farragut, Idaho.
- 1982 The third National Camporama was held in Pigeon Forge, Tennessee.
- 1986 The National Royal Rangers Training Center (now "National Royal Rangers Center") at Eagle Rock, Missouri, is dedicated; it is also called Camp Eagle Rock.
- 1989 National Commander Johnnie Barnes dies due to an apparent heart attack. For 27 years he led the Royal Rangers, developing its ministry.
- 1989 Rev. Ken Hunt is named national commander. He guides the ministry for ten years. Under his leadership, the system for advancements expanded, a new Leader Manual is created, and National Royal Rangers Academy is launched.
- 1990 The first International Royal Rangers Camporama is held at Camp Eagle Rock, Missouri.
- 1994 The sixth National Camporama is held at Camp Eagle Rock.
- 1998 The seventh National Camporama is held at Camp Eagle Rock.
- 1999 Rev. Richard Mariott is appointed national commander. He was the commander for the Northern California/Nevada for seven years. Under his leadership, Camp Eagle Rock underwent great improvements, The curriculum of Royal Rangers and training programs also underwent substantial improvements and redevelopment. Furthermore, Royal Rangers Alumni (RRI) was established. Marriott's goals were to encourage Royal Rangers and develop new programs.
- 2002 Ranger Kids, the first portion of the newly revised Royal Rangers ministry, is tested and released to U.S. churches.
- 2002 The eighth National Camporama is held at Camp Eagle Rock.
- 2002 Royal Rangers International (RRI) is formed, which helps to coordinate efforts and needs of ≈45 countries using Royal Rangers at the time.
- 2003 Discovery Rangers and Adventure Rangers materials are released to U.S. churches.
- 2004 Expedition Rangers materials are released to U.S. churches.
- 2006 The ninth National Camporama is held at Camp Eagle Rock.
- 2006 Rev. Richard Mariott announces that he will resign as National Commander on December 31, 2006.
- 2007 Rev. Doug Marsh is named National Commander. He was previously Director of Royal Rangers International. His appointment was effective February 1, 2007. Marsh will continue to also direct Royal Rangers International until a transition in leadership in that department can be made. Marsh is also the first National Commander to have been involved in the ministry of Royal Rangers as a boy, having earned his Gold Medal of Achievement.
- 2008 At their annual National Council, Royal Rangers announces plans to expand the scope of the program beyond the traditional camping emphasis to include activities of common interest to all boys (i.e. sports, technology, trades, drama/arts, outdoors, and ministry).
- 2010 The new advancement system for Discovery Rangers, Adventure Rangers, and Expedition Rangers is released. This new system will run concurrently with the previous 2002 version until Dec 31, 2012.
- 2012 Royal Rangers USA celebrates its 50th anniversary during its tenth National Camporama at Camp Eagle Rock in Eagle Rock, Missouri.
- 2014 Doug Marsh resigns as national director to return to full-time leadership of Royal Rangers International.
- 2014 Karl Fleig, former district men's ministries director for the Indiana district is appointed as the new national director for Royal Rangers USA.
- 2016 The 11th National Camporama is held at Camp Eagle Rock.
- 2022 The 12th National Camporama is held at Camp Eagle Rock.

=== Divisions ===
There are four divisions of the Royal Rangers program corresponding to the age group:

- Ranger Kids (Kindergarten to 2nd grade)
- Discovery Rangers (3rd grade to 5th grade)
- Adventure Rangers (6th grade to 8th grade)
- Expedition Rangers (High School (i.e. 9th–12th grade))

=== Special programs ===
The program features a number of components of special interest to certain types of our membership. These include: Frontiersman Camping Fellowship (FCF), Royal Rangers Alumni, The Outpost Ranger of the Year, The NSSP (National Shooting Sports Program), The National Championships, Brownells/NRA National Youth Shooting Sports Program, and the "Together Plan".

=== Royal Rangers International ===
Royal Rangers ministers to young people in the United States and in over 90 countries through the support of Royal Rangers International, the Assemblies of God World Missions organization tasked with the responsibility to support Royal Rangers worldwide. Thus, in 2002, Royal Rangers International was created. The largest organization outside the United States is in Australia, with groups in all areas except Northern Territory and Western Australia.

=== Membership Controversies ===
The Royal Rangers have been accused of shielding adult leaders who have been reported for sexual misconduct, which has resulted in major media coverage, criminal prosecutions and convictions, as well as civil lawsuits.

The Assembly of God church issued a statement in response to these allegations on December, 9, 2025.

== Mpact Girls Clubs ==
Mpact Girls Clubs, formerly known as Missionettes Girls Clubs, are part of a worldwide program directed by National Girls Ministries within the Assemblies of God. The program is the counterpart ministry to Royal Rangers. The Clubs were created to allow girls an opportunity to discuss issues that matter to them and learn how to live according to Biblical principles given by Jesus.

The name was changed from Missionettes to Mpact Girls Clubs in March 2007 as part of a strategic plan to reach girls in a more holistic manner. The Clubs were subsequently divided into three categories to accommodate the boys in the two early clubs, Sunlight Kids and Rainbows.

The Missionettes were founded by the Assemblies of God Women's Ministries in 1956.

=== Purpose ===
Girls Ministries Clubs are driven by a 5-fold Purpose.

- To win girls to Jesus Christ through love and acceptance.
- To teach them to obey everything Jesus commanded us—developing girls spiritually and mentally.
- To provide encouragement, support and accountability through lasting Christian relationships.
- To provide an environment for girls to develop their gifts and abilities.
- To acquaint them with the Great Commission of Jesus Christ our Lord.

=== Girls Clubs Code ===
One of the distinctives that sets these clubs apart from other clubs is that there is a code which is the mind-set of all leaders and girls. The Code is Philippians 4:8—"Whatever is true, whatever is noble, whatever is right, whatever is pure, whatever is lovely, whatever is admirable, if anything is excellent or praiseworthy, think about such things." (NIV)

=== Club levels ===
Girls Ministries clubs are organized into three categories of clubs. The leaders of each club are called "Sponsors".

Mpact Kids Clubs (Co-ed)

- Sunlight Kids is the club for nursery-age children up to 36 months. Boys and Girls may be part of the Sunlight Kids club.
- Rainbows is the club for 3 and 4 year olds. Boys and Girls may be part of the Rainbows club. When a boy starts Kindergarten he will move into the Royal Rangers program. The Rainbow colors are Green and White. The club motto is "Rainbows are helpers."

Mpact Girls Clubs

- Daisies is the club for Kindergarten girls. It is a one-year program. The Daisies colors are Yellow and White. The club motto is "Daisies tell about Jesus."
- Prims is the club for 1st and 2nd grade girls. The club colors are Pink and White. The Prims motto is "I will be kind and thoughtful."
- Stars is the club for 3rd through 5th grade girls. The club colors are Blue and White. The Stars motto is "I will follow Jesus."

Teen Girl Ministries (TGM)

- Friends is the club for 6th through 8th grade girls. The club colors are Purple and White. The Friends motto is "We are committed to God."
- Girls Only is the club for 9th through 12th grade girls. The club colors are Red and White. The Girls Only motto is "Every day in every way I will boldly live for God."

== See also ==
- Christian Service Brigade
- Trail Life USA
- Pathfinders
- Awana
- Child Evangelism Fellowship
- Child evangelism movement
