= Flannelgraph =

Storytelling system that uses a board covered with flannel fabric

A scene from a flannelgraph Bible story

Flannelgraph (also called flannel board or flannelgram) is a storytelling system that uses a board covered with flannel fabric, usually resting on an easel. It is very similar to Fuzzy Felt, although its primary use is as a storytelling medium, rather than as a toy.

== Description of use ==
The flannel board is usually painted to depict a background scene appropriate to the story being told. Paper cutouts of characters and objects in the story are then placed on the board, and moved around, as the story unfolds. These cutouts are backed, either with flannel, or with some other substance that adheres lightly to the flannel background, such as coarse sandpaper.

Plain, undecorated flannel boards can also be used as a visual aid during presentations, allowing the speaker to display and remove charts and graphs as needed.

== Associations with Christianity ==
In the United States, flannelgraph has been (and continues to be) a popular medium for telling Bible stories to young Sunday School students in Christian (and particularly Evangelical) churches.

Indeed, in the United States it is used as a storytelling method almost exclusively in elementary-level Christian education. This can be attributed, in part, to the fact that flannelgraph is relatively inexpensive, yet provides a more vivid alternative to storytelling without visual illustration.

Most people use pre-published pictures and lessons, such as from Betty Lukens or Child Evangelism Fellowship, and some add on their materials for introduction or application, as in the "Illustrating Application" (Florence Hunnicutt) videos on YouTube.

== See also ==
- Child Evangelism Fellowship
- Fuzzy-Felt
- Bible story

== Bibliography ==
- Wright, Marsha Elyn; McCloskey (illust.), Patty (2000). Creative storytelling with flannelboards. Torrance, CA: Judy/Instructo. ISBN 978-0-7682-0484-1.
