= Child evangelism movement =

Christian evangelism movement founded in 1937

The child evangelism movement is an American Christian evangelism movement founded in 1937 by Jesse Irvin Overholtzer, who founded the Christian organization Child Evangelism Fellowship (CEF). It focuses on the 4/14 window, which centers on evangelizing children between the ages of 4 and 14 years. The movement focuses on targeting children, as they are considered both the most receptive to evangelization and the most effective at evangelizing their peer group, with groups supportive of the initiative arguing for the need to refocus evangelization efforts on the 4-14 age group worldwide.

== Strategy and history ==
Age at conversion (1996)
Before age 6	6%
Ages 6–9	24%
Ages 10–12	26%
Ages 13–14	15%
Ages 15–19	10%
Ages 20 and over	19%

In April 1994, a two-day conference held by Awana Clubs International in Streamwood, Illinois hosted children's ministry leaders from 54 organizations, focusing on ways to evangelize children between the ages of 4 and 14. The conference was sponsored by Christianity Today International, along with six other groups co-sponsoring the event.

A survey conducted in 1995–1996 by the Southern Baptist Theological Seminary found that 71% of Christians in the US converted before the age of 14.

In 2003, George Barna published the results of his research, showing that children were the most important population segment to minister to, as they were considered the most likely to absorb spiritual teaching due to developmental vulnerability. Barna argued that a child's moral development was "set" by the age of nine, in contrast to the tactics of many churches focusing on teaching older children. Barna wrote that "habits related to the practice of one's faith develop when one is young and change surprisingly little over time", and that "the older a child gets, the more distracted and vulnerable he or she becomes" to what he described as "nonfamily influences". Barna also found that children who converted to Christianity before their teenage years were more likely to remain "absolutely committed" to Christianity.

In 2004, at the Lausanne Committee for World Evangelization in Thailand, a group of Christian evangelists examined the state of evangelism among children. The Lausanne committee published a paper arguing that evangelists should target children under 14 in the global South for conversion, and created the Aim Lower initiative.

In 2005, Christian relief organization World Vision declared the child evangelism movement "very important" in the 21st century. Dan Brewster, a director of World Vision, argued in a paper in 2005 that "The poor and exploited tend to be much more receptive to the Gospel", and that children and young people should be targeted in areas where disease, poverty and conflict have disrupted their lives. The paper included basic ethical considerations, such as not evangelising children without parental consent, or where their families are entirely dependent on Christian charities for financial or material support, or in a way that disparages their local culture.

== 4/14 window ==
The 4/14 window was originally conceived by Bryant Myers of World Vision and later popularized by Christian missionary strategist Luis Bush, who also coined the term 10/40 window. The 4/14 window is a subset of the child evangelism movement, focused on evangelizing children between the ages of 4 and 14 years old. Bush commented in the Christian Post in 2009 that "Mission strategies developed for the 4/14 Window would be implemented by parents, pastors and other role model figures who play key roles in shaping a child's worldview."

== Criticism ==
Proponents of the 4/14 window encourage children from the age of four to be converted to Christianity. Evangelists often use techniques such as a Wordless Book to communicate religious concepts to children too young to read. Critics of this practice argue that children too young to read for themselves are too young to be able to make informed, independent decisions about religion; in the same vein, some Christian authors are critical of the use of altar calls, wherein those who wish to make a new spiritual commitment to Jesus and the Christian faith are invited to come forward publicly. Some theologians argue that altar calls may give converts a false understanding of religious salvation.

Protestant criticism has expressed concern that young converts grow up to have a false understanding of the religion, and that widespread secularisation of Europe and North America is the product of false conversions in childhood. John F. MacArthur has been critical of evangelists coercing a profession of faith from children, especially when the evangelist oversimplifies parts of the religion in order to get a large number of children to "convert", in response to a formulaic presentation light on details of the faith. Theologian Randal Rauser has criticized the practice of "conversionism," which emphasizes immediate change in religion, rather than a gradual transformation of life and belief. He has also criticized the targeting of young children, who can be "easily manipulated" into confessing belief in things they do not understand to please adults.

In the 19th century, the philosopher Arthur Schopenhauer argued that teaching some ideas to children at a young age could foster resistance to doubting those ideas later on.

In her 2012 book The Good News Club: The Christian Right's Stealth Assault on America's Children, journalist Katherine Stewart criticized various practices of the 'Good News Club' after-school Bible study program, including young participants being rewarded for recruiting friends of other faiths and denominations whose parents have not enrolled them in the program. She argued that children in schools were encouraged to bully children who did not share their faith. Stewart has also criticised the efforts of politically conservative biblical literalists to convert young children to forms of Christian belief that advocate a literal reading of Old Testament narratives; in 2013, Stewart argued that biblical literalists teach children to read from the Old Testament in order to understand the divinely-ordered extermination of the Amalekites as used to justify genocide. In response, the Childhood Evangelism Foundation stated that they encouraged a literal reading of the extermination of the Amalekites, but did not encourage children to view it as an endorsement of historical or current genocides.
