= The Power Worshippers =

2019 book by Katherine Stewart

The Power Worshippers: Inside the Dangerous Rise of Religious Nationalism
- First edition
- Author: Katherine Stewart
- Language: English
- Publisher: Bloomsbury Publishing
- Publication date: 2020
- Publication place: United States
- Media type: Print (hardcover), e-book
- Pages: 352
- ISBN: 978-1-63557-343-5
- OCLC: 1141734279

The Power Worshippers: Inside the Dangerous Rise of Religious Nationalism is a 2020 nonfiction book by American journalist and author Katherine Stewart. The book describes Christian nationalism in the United States as a regressive political ideology with historical ties to opposition to abolitionism in the 19th century, hostility towards Franklin D. Roosevelt's New Deal programs in the 1930s, and resistance to the civil rights movement in the 1950s. Christian nationalists, Stewart argues, falsely believe that America was founded on the Bible and vocally reject the principle of separation of church and state established by the Founding Fathers of the United States, desiring instead to impose their version of theocracy and authoritarianism in its place, often by force.

== Development ==
Stewart first became interested in the subject in 2009, when she was directly confronted with the problem in her daughter's public school, where Christian evangelicals were using after-school programs known as Good News Clubs to promote their religious goals and proselytize to children, with their ultimate aim of defunding and eliminating public education in the United States. Her experience led her to write the book The Good News Club: The Christian Right's Stealth Assault on America's Children (2012). Stewart would later expand on this idea in The Power Worshippers, proposing that charter schools are used by the religious and free market fundamentalists alike to privatize government services, which serves to both propagandize right-wing ideas and beliefs and to redirect funds from the public to the private sector. "This privatization, although it covers itself in libertarian rhetoric, is essential to the project of indoctrinating the next generation in the 'right' ideology and the right religion—with the added benefit of funneling public dollars into the pockets of right-thinking businessmen."

== Synopsis ==
The book argues that Christian nationalism in the United States is far more than just a social movement focusing simply on culture war issues like abortion and gay marriage, but a highly organized and well-funded political movement that seeks to replace secular, democratic values and institutions with conservative and religious ones, where the will to power takes precedence over religious, spiritual, and moral tenets of the Christian faith. Stewart presents a history of the movement, showing how in the 1970s, early right-wing Christian nationalism was less concerned with morality and more interested in fighting the IRS to maintain the tax-exempt status of their churches. This led to the rise of the New Right and their novel use of abortion by Jerry Falwell and others as a political issue to unify their side, even as many conservatives continued to support legal abortion until the 1990s. The Christian nationalist movement attracted major funding by plutocrats with similar goals, leading to their increasing control and eventual takeover of the Republican Party, starting with the election of Ronald Reagan in the 1980s, and ending with the election of Donald Trump in 2016, who would successfully help members of the movement repeal legal abortion and open the door to the goals of Christian nationalism at the federal level with his anti-democratic, autocratic style, which represents a recrudescence of the divine right of kings, a notion supported by Christian nationalists, who believe that kings derive their authority from God, and cannot be held accountable by the rule of law.

== Related work ==
Reviewers noted that Stewart's book fills a niche on the subject of Christian nationalism in the United States, including previous work by Jeff Sharlet on The Fellowship in The Family: The Secret Fundamentalism at the Heart of American Power (2008) and C Street: The Fundamentalist Threat to American Democracy (2010); Anne Nelson's investigation of the Council for National Policy in Shadow Network: Media, Money, and the Secret Hub of the Radical Right (2019); Gerardo Marti's historical focus in American Blindspot: Race, Class, Religion, and the Trump Presidency (2019); and Andrew L. Whitehead and Samuel L. Perry's Taking America Back for God: Christian Nationalism in the United States (2020).

== Adaptation ==
The documentary film God & Country (2024), directed by Dan Partland and produced by Rob Reiner, was based on The Power Worshippers.

== Bibliography ==
- Stewart, Katherine (2020). The Power Worshippers: Inside the Dangerous Rise of Religious Nationalism. New York, NY: Bloomsbury Publishing. ISBN 9781635573435. OCLC 1141734279.
