= Fuzzy-Felt =

Fabric toy

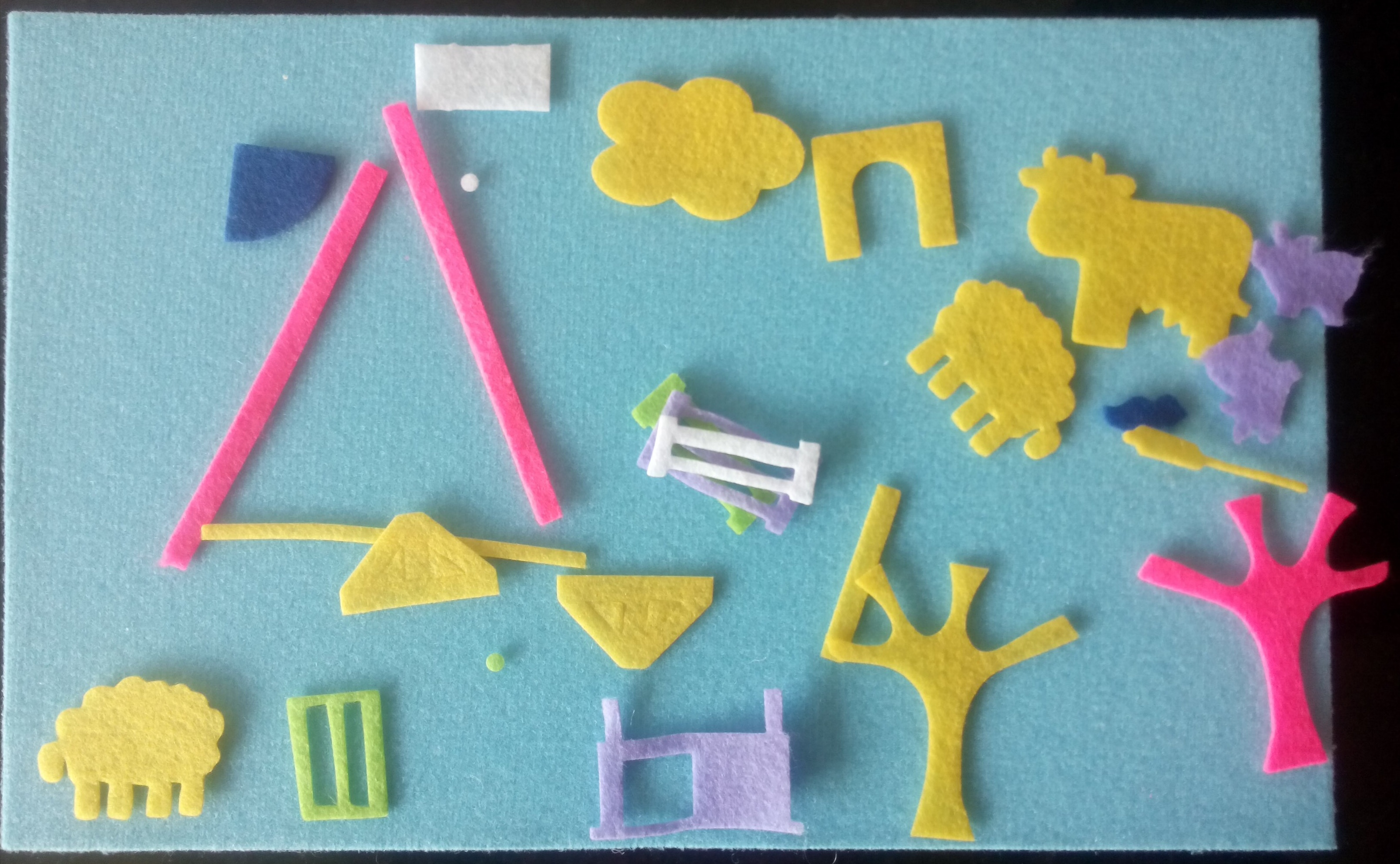
A composition in Fuzzy-Felt by a two-year-old.

Fuzzy-Felt is a simple fabric toy intended for young children, first sold in 1950. The toys consist of a flocked backing board onto which a number of felt shapes are placed to create different pictures. Felt pieces can be simple silhouettes or more detailed printed shapes. For a farmyard scene, for example, auxiliary pieces would typically be cows, sheep, chickens, horses, cats, dogs, a farmer, and a tractor. Other scenes might include hospitals, pets, and vehicles. Fuzzy-Felt is for children over the age of three years, as the pieces may present a choking hazard.

== History ==
Fuzzy-Felt was invented by Lois Allan (nee Day) (d. Farnham Common 1989) during World War II, although similar products had existed pre-war, for example, Kiddicraft K100 'Pictures in Felt' of 1937. Lois Allan, who was American, studied art and fashion in Paris in the 1920s. She married a Great War RAF captain, the Scottish Peter Allan, and moved to Vine Cottage in Farnham Common in Buckinghamshire in the United Kingdom, where the couple ran a travel agency and other entrepreneurial pursuits including printing cruise ships on cigarette cases.

During the Second World War, Peter’s son, Lois’s step-son, Anthony Murray Allan, also known as 'Jock' or Peter, was captured by the Germans, escaping from a prison camp as part of the "Laufen 6", but was recaptured and sent to Colditz, where he daringly escaped inside a mattress, only to be recaptured in Austria.

During the Second World War, Peter and Lois Allan contributed to the war effort by manufacturing felt gaskets for sealing components in tanks in the outbuildings of her home. Other women were involved in this work, and the Allan family ran a nursery for their children. She was inspired to create the toy after observing how much enjoyment children had taking the discarded and misshaped pieces of felt and sticking them to the backs of table mats. Product development following the end of the War took a few years, but after gaining the interest of toy buyers at John Lewis and Heals, Allan was able to bring Fuzzy-Felt to market in 1950, later founding Allan Industries Ltd.

Production continued at Allan's home, Vine Cottage, until 1972 when the business relocated to larger premises in the Cressex Estate in High Wycombe. In 1996 the business was bought by Mandolyn Ltd in a management buy-out, and production continued in High Wycombe until increasing manufacturing costs led to the licensing of the Fuzzy-Felt brand to a much larger UK toy manufacturer and wholesalers, Toy Brokers Ltd of Huntingdon. In 2001, via his holding company, Mr Douglas Ware a Buckinghamshire-based businessman acquired a controlling interest in Mandolyn Ltd. This holding company became 100% owner of Mandolyn Ltd and Fuzzy-Felt Ltd in 2012. In 2011, Toy Brokers Ltd had in turn been bought by John Adams Leisure Ltd who then became the licensee of the Fuzzy-Felt brand for Toy products.

As of 2016, an estimated 26.25 million sets of Fuzzy-felt had been sold internationally. Although Fuzzy-Felt reached its peak in popularity sometime in the mid-1970s, it remains an iconic children's toy, still enjoyed by children who play with it and parents who nostalgically purchase it.

== Popularity ==
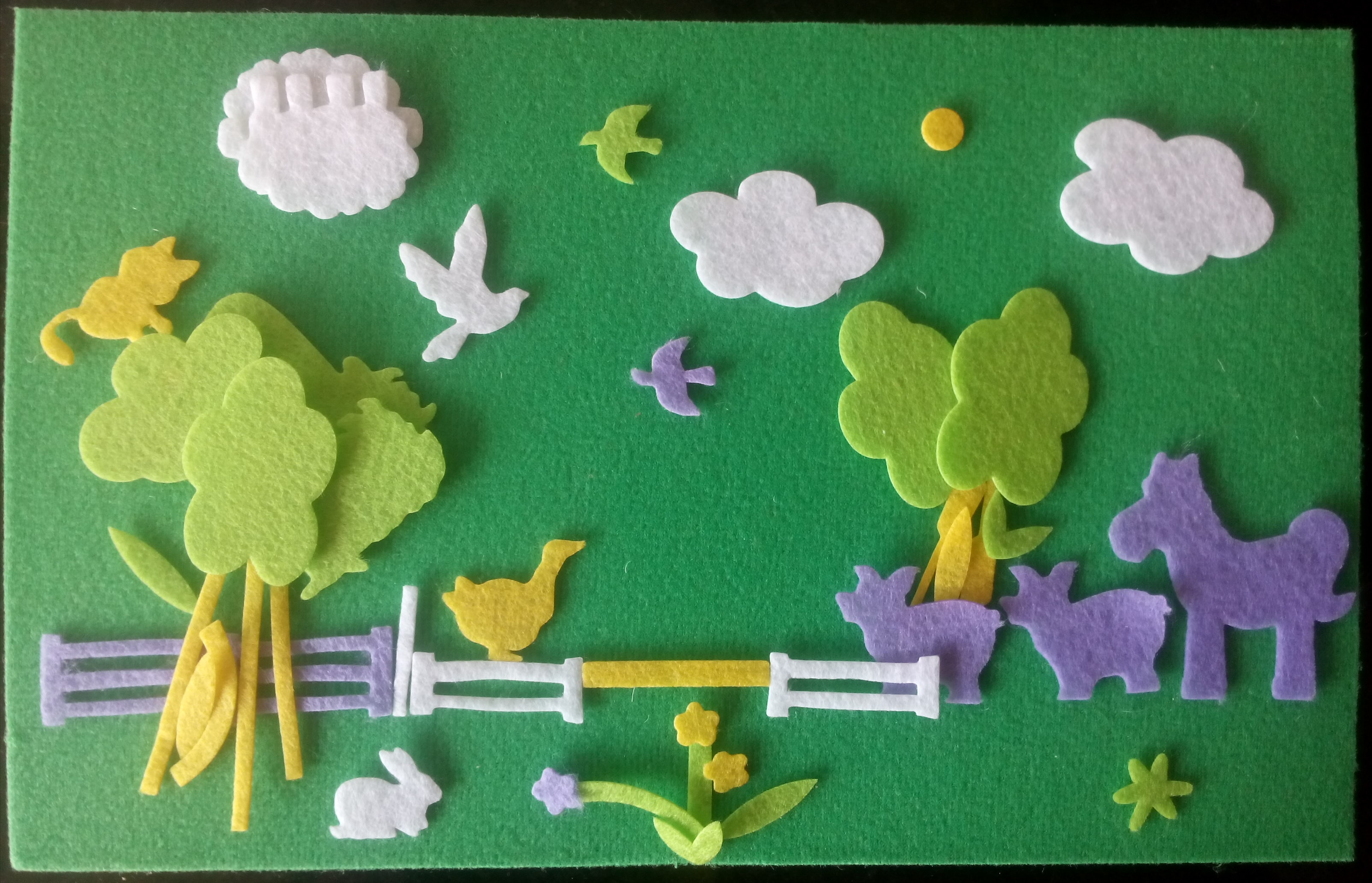
Fuzzy-Felt composition of a farmyard scene by an adult.

Many reasons have been posited for Fuzzy-Felt's popularity. The quiet toy was, and still is, fairly cheap, portable, and tidy. Though the sets started out strictly as a collection of various coloured shapes, countless themed Fuzzy-Felt sets became available through the years. "Ballet, Farmyard, Circus, Hospital, and much later on Thomas the Tank Engine, Noddy, and My Little Pony were released to inspire [a child's] picture-making" abilities.

Fuzzy-Felt was also a favoured toy in Sunday schools because of its "Bible Stories set, complete with camels and three kings."

== In popular culture ==
=== Fashion ===
In 2008, fashion designer Stella McCartney used a “ 7-meter high, 14-meter wide” Fuzzy-Felt backdrop, created by artists Jake and Dinos Chapman, as a visual accent for the debut of her 2008 spring/summer collection in Paris. The backdrop was made up of “rainbow-coloured rabbits, giraffes and a particularly anxious ladybird”, all reminiscent of the 1970s child’s toy.

=== Literature ===
In Jeanette Winterson's novel Oranges Are Not the Only Fruit, the protagonist Jess uses Fuzzy-Felt to depict Bible scenes, one of which is a rewrite of Daniel in the lions' den. She depicts Daniel as getting eaten by the lions, and when confronted by the pastor tries to disguise this by saying that she 'wanted to do Jonah and the whale, but they don't do whales in Fuzzy-Felt'. The pastor then tells Jess that they should do the Astonishment at Dawn scene, and Jess remarks to herself that this is 'hopeless... Susan Green was sick on the tableau of the three Wise Men at Christmas, and you only get three kings to a box'.

=== Music ===
Fuzzy-Felt Folk is a collection of “rare, delightful folk oddities for strange adults and maybe their children too… The front cover imagery of the album is from the original 1968 Fuzzy-Felt Fantasy set.”

=== Current ===
Fuzzy-Felt toy products are currently sold by John Adams Leisure Ltd of Huntingdon, under license from Fuzzy-Felt Ltd and Mandolyn Ltd. There is a UK registered trade mark (number 2461883) for "Fuzzy-Felt", registered to a non-trading UK company (number 03227732) "Fuzzy-Felt Ltd". In 2017 Fuzzy-Felt was commemorated with a special stamp from the Royal Mail, which was celebrating 10 of the most iconic and much-loved British toys from the last 100 years. Fuzzy-Felt was amongst the top ten classic toys chosen. Even after nearly 70 years, Fuzzy-Felt continues to evoke feelings of nostalgia across generations and is still hugely popular throughout the world today.

== See also ==
- Flannelgraph or flannel board - generic felt boards used for storytelling and education
- Colorforms - similar scene construction sets, applying vinyl cutouts to a vinyl board
