= Wrist-band.com =

American technology company

- Type: Private
- Industry: Technology
- Founded: 2007
- Founders: Azim Makanojiya, CEO; Zishan Momin, president
- Headquarters: United States
- Products: Customized silicone wristbands
- Number of employees: 1 (2020)
- Parent: ZAAPPAAZ, LLC
- Website: www.wrist-band.com

Wrist-band.com is an American technology company that manufactures and retails silicone wristbands online. The company was founded by Zishan Momin and Azim Makanojiya, who was included on Inc. Magazine’s list of the Top 10 South Asian Entrepreneurs in 2011.

The company and its CEO, Azim Makanojiya, pleaded guilty to price-fixing under the Sherman Act and agreed to pay a $1.9 million fine. Azim Makanojiya may face a personal fine and/or up to one year in prison if convicted.

In 2020 a separate suit was filed by the Federal Trade Commission for failing to timely deliver Personal Protective Equipment (PPE) as promised to buyers during the COVID-19 pandemic.

== History ==
Wrist-band.com was founded in Houston, Texas in 2007 by Azim Makanojiya and Zishan Momin. Makanojiya had initially lied and said he started the company as a project while attending the University of Houston as a computer engineering major. The company was actually started as an imitation of another online wristband retailer. Wrist-band.com was sued for copyright infringement and settled out of court. Starting the operation in his garage in Houston, Mumbai-born Makanojiya was also supporting his family financially at the time.

After its first year in operation, the company stated to Inc 500 that they generated over $6.9 million. In 2011, Wrist-band.com was ranked 31st on the Inc 500 list of fastest growing companies and is also included as one of the fastest growing technology companies in Houston although they actually don't create any type of technology and simply outsource production of wristbands overseas.

The company began as a two-man operation taking orders over the phone using a deceptive website using several deceptive trade practices. Since then, it has approximately 30 call center representatives in India and 40 manufacturing employees working in the Wrist-band.com factory in China.

Wrist-band.com operates an e-commerce website that retails silicone wristbands in various colors that can be customized with specific words or phrases.

== Legal Issues ==
=== Price Fixing (2017) ===
On August 7, 2017, according to the U.S. Department of Justice, Azim Maknojiya agreed to plead guilty to conspiring to fix prices for customized promotional products sold online to customers in the United States. Zaappaaz Inc while they still continue to deceive consumers and use deceptive trade practices such as bait and switch tactics. (d/b/a WB Promotions Inc., Wrist-Band.com and Customlanyard.net) and its president Azim Makanojiya, agreed to plead guilty to a one-count criminal violation of the Sherman Act, but is due in the federal courts again on October 22, 2017.

On August 30, 2017, a customer of this company filed a class action lawsuit against the Zaappaaz Inc, wrist-band.com parent company, since the company pleaded guilty to price fixing and causing damages to customers in that time frame.

=== Failing to deliver Personal Protective Equipment (PPE) (2020) ===
The Federal Trade Commission filed suit against Zaappaaz, the operators of wrist-band.com and other online storefronts, for failing to deliver on promises that they could quickly ship products like face masks, sanitizer, and other personal protective equipment (PPE) related to the coronavirus pandemic.

The lawsuit alleges that the company violated the FTC's Mail, Internet and Telephone Order Rule (Mail Order Rule), which requires that companies notify consumers of shipping delays in a timely manner and give consumers the chance to cancel orders and receive prompt refunds.
