= Frontiersmen Camping Fellowship =

The Frontiersmen Camping Fellowship is a program of the Royal Rangers, and serves as their service/honor organization, similar to the Boy Scouts of America's Order of the Arrow.

- Courage
- Achievement
- Friendship
- Leadership
- Woodsmanship (Bushcraft, Australia)

Young adults in the Royal Rangers program who meet the requirements are strongly encouraged by its leaders to pursue an interest in becoming a part of the FCF. Skills that can be learned from the FCF are campfire cooking, Christian service in the community, fellowship, frontier outfit making, black powder rifle shooting, trading, tomahawk and knife throwing, teepee camping, hide tanning, bead craft, scrimshaw, leather craft, wood working, and more.

== Entrance To FCF ==
In Australia a new recruit wishing to enter FCF must fulfill the following criteria

- Adventure Ranger Age
- Meet the other requirements

Upon this they then undertake an entrance exam, Phase 1 and 2 testing. Phase 1 testing comprises practical knowledge, e.g., compass work and lashings. To pass recruits must

- Pass the Bible section of Phase 1 with 90% or more.
- They are allowed to fail only 2 sections.

In the United States these are the requirements for joining FCF:

Boys

- Earn all 8 red "Trail of the Grizzly" merits (Camping, First Aid Skills, Toolcraft, Ropecraft, Lashing, Compass, Firecraft, Cooking)
- Be an Adventure Ranger in at least the sixth grade and be at least 11 years old
- Be recommended by an Outpost Commander
- Explain the Plan of Salvation
- Recite the Meaning of the four Red Points, four Gold Points and eight Blue Points of the Royal Ranger Emblem

Leaders

- Earn or teach the eight red "Trail of the Grizzly Merits" (Camping, First Aid Skills, Toolcraft, Ropecraft, Lashing, Compass, Firecraft, Cooking)
- Complete the Royal Rangers Basics & Essentials Modules(FCF Handbook page 34) of the Leaders Training Academy
- Be a leader in good standing in the local church

Upon earning all eight merits, both men and boys are eligible to wear the Trail of the Grizzly patch. They must then complete a Frontier Adventure before being awarded their Frontiersman Pin.

== Trades ==
Australian FCF members, particularly those in New South Wales, are encouraged to pick up "trades". A "trade" is a line of work typically undertaken in the 1800s. New FCF members can create a costume, reflecting on what a typical person in that trade would wear. They can also man a stall in the "FCF Village" during major Rangers gatherings.
