= The Founding Myth =

2019 non-fiction book

The Founding Myth: Why Christian Nationalism Is Un-American
- Author: Andrew Seidel
- Subject: Christian nationalism
- Genre: Non-fiction
- Publisher: Sterling Publishing
- Publication date: 2019
- Pages: 338
- ISBN: 978-1-4549-3327-4
- OCLC: 1100422366
- LC Class: BR520 .S45 2019

The Founding Myth: Why Christian Nationalism Is Un-American is a 2019 book by constitutional lawyer Andrew Seidel about the separation of church and state in the United States.

== Synopsis ==
The book began as a law review article by Andrew Seidel, the vice president for strategic communications at Americans United for Separation of Church and State. According to the author, the book attempts to provide historically correct facts and arguments for its positions and those of the separationist side. It rebuts the idea of Christian nationalism. In four parts, Seidel makes his case with reference to the founders and the colonies, the influence of the Bible in the United States, a contrasting of the Ten Commandments and the Constitution, and the use of uniquely American mottoes, such as In God We Trust.

The foreword of the book was written by Susan Jacoby, and the preface by Dan Barker.

== Reception ==
The Los Angeles Review of Books called the book "brilliant, ambitious, well-researched, and compelling" and said Seidel presented "strong arguments" against Christian nationalism: that the United States Constitution is "deliberately godless" and that it expressly forbids religious tests for office in Article VI. Publishers Weekly said that it is a "furious debut" providing a "fervent takedown" of Christian nationalism yet also said "readers who don’t agree with Seidel will dismiss his forceful tone".

In 2019, conservative evangelical pastor Greg Locke burned a copy of the book which Seidel had sent to Locke to review. Locke posted a video of the book burning to his social media accounts. While Seidel sent Locke a copy of the book in hopes of sparking a conversation about the issues in question, Locke admitted beforehand that he had no intention of ever reading the book. Response to the video included many replies expressing the intention to purchase and read the book and to donate copies to libraries, which Locke called an example of the Streisand effect.
