= Good News Club v. Milford Central School =

- Supreme Court of the United States

Argued February 28, 2001 Decided June 11, 2001
- Full case name: Good News Club, et al. v. Milford Central School
- Citations: 533 U.S. 98 (more) 121 S. Ct. 2093; 150 L. Ed. 2d 151; 2001 U.S. LEXIS 4312; 69 U.S.L.W. 4451; 2001 Cal. Daily Op. Service 4737; 2001 Daily Journal DAR 5858; 2001 Colo. J. C.A.R. 2934; 14 Fla. L. Weekly Fed. S 337

Case history
- Prior: 21 F. Supp. 2d 147 (N.D.N.Y. 1998); affirmed, 202 F.3d 502 (2d Cir. 2000); cert. granted, 531 U.S. 923 (2000).

Holding
- Denying access to a limited public forum on the ground that the applicant's use is religious in nature discriminates based on religious viewpoint in violation of the Free Speech Clause.

Court membership
- Chief Justice William Rehnquist Associate Justices John P. Stevens · Sandra Day O'Connor; Antonin Scalia · Anthony Kennedy; David Souter · Clarence Thomas; Ruth Bader Ginsburg · Stephen Breyer

Case opinions
- Majority: Thomas, joined by Rehnquist, O'Connor, Scalia, Kennedy; Breyer (in part)
- Concurrence: Scalia
- Concurrence: Breyer (in part)
- Dissent: Stevens
- Dissent: Souter, joined by Ginsburg

Laws applied
- U.S. Const. amends. I, XIV; N.Y. Educ. Law § 414

Good News Club v. Milford Central School, 533 U.S. 98 (2001), was a (6–3) decision of the U.S. Supreme Court written by Clarence Thomas holding that a public school's exclusion of a club from its limited public forum based solely on the club's religious nature was impermissible viewpoint discrimination.

== Background ==
Under New York law, public schools may adopt regulations under which they open their facilities to public use during non-school hours. In 1992, Milford Central School adopted regulations under this law, allowing district residents to use the school for "instruction in any branch of education, learning, or the arts," and making the school available for "social, civic, and recreational meetings and entertainment events, and other uses pertaining to the welfare of the community, provided that such uses shall be nonexclusive and shall be opened to the general public."

The Fourniers, who reside in the district, applied to use the Milford Central School for meetings of a Good News Club. Their proposed use—to have "a fun time of singing songs, hearing a Bible lesson and memorizing scripture"—was deemed to be the equivalent of religious worship, and the Fourniers' application was denied on that basis; the school also claimed that its community use policy forbade use "by any individual or organization for religious purposes." The Fourniers contacted the school superintendent to challenge the school’s decision to deny the Good News Club use of its facilities. They argued that the school could not refuse the Good News Club, which addressed morals and values from a Christian perspective, access to facilities it made available to secular groups addressing the same subjects. The school concluded that "the kinds of activities proposed to be engaged in by the Good News Club were not a discussion of secular subjects such as child rearing, development of character and development of morals from a religious perspective, but were in fact the equivalent of religious instruction itself." The full school board rejected the club's application to use Milford's facilities.

== Procedural history ==
The Fourniers and the Good News Club filed suit in the United States District Court for the Northern District of New York under 42 U.S.C. § 1983 against the school. The club alleged that the school's denial of its application violated its free speech rights under the First Amendment, as well as its right to religious freedom under the Religious Freedom Restoration Act. The club won a preliminary injunction allowing it to conduct its meetings at the school from April 1997 to August 1998. In August 1998, however, the district court ruled against the club, finding that the club's "subject matter is decidedly religious in nature, and not merely a discussion of secular matters from a religious perspective that is otherwise permitted" by the school. Because the school forbade all religious instruction under its policy, the court ruled that it was not engaging in unconstitutional viewpoint discrimination.

The club appealed to the Second Circuit. The Second Circuit affirmed, holding that the school's restriction was not unreasonable. In light of the "quintessentially religious" nature of the club's activities, the court further held that the school district was engaging in "constitutional subject discrimination" rather than "unconstitutional viewpoint discrimination" when it excluded the club from meeting on its premises. In light of a split among the federal appeals courts regarding whether speech may be excluded from a limited public forum by reason of its religious content, the U.S. Supreme Court agreed to review the Second Circuit's ruling in this case. Thomas Marcelle represented the Good News Club at oral argument, and Frank Miller represented Milford Central School.

== Earlier cases ==
=== Lamb's Chapel ===
In Lamb's Chapel, the Court held that a school district violated the First Amendment's Free Speech Clause when it excluded a private group from presenting films at the school solely on the basis of the religious perspective of the films on family values.

=== Rosenberger ===
In Rosenberger, the Court held that a university's refusal to fund a student publication because of that publication's religious perspective violated the Free Speech Clause.

== Majority opinion ==
The Court found that the exclusion of the Good News Club was based solely on its religious nature. Milford had asserted before the Second Circuit that it would have allowed a public group to use Aesop's fables to impart moral values to children. Milford also allowed the Boy Scouts to "influence a boy's character, development, and spiritual growth". Likewise, the Good News Club also sought to teach moral values to children, albeit from an explicitly Christian viewpoint.

A "limited public forum" may "reserve its forum for certain groups or for the discussion of certain topics" but because the exclusion of the Good News Club discriminated against a viewpoint, the Court did not rule on whether the restriction was "reasonable in light of the purpose served by the forum". Applying Lamb's Chapel v. Center Moriches Union Free School District, 508 U.S. 384 (1993), and Rosenberger v. University of Virginia, 515 U.S. 819 (1995), the Court held that the exclusion of the Good News Club was impermissible viewpoint discrimination.

According to the majority, the Court's prior decisions in Lamb's Chapel and Rosenberger determined the outcome of the Good News Club's free speech claim. In Lamb's Chapel, the Court had ruled that a different New York public school had engaged in unconstitutional viewpoint discrimination when it forbade a religious group from using its facilities to show films that taught "family values from a Christian perspective". It saw no difference between the films that the religious group in Lamb's Chapel proposed to show and the songs and lessons the Good News Club used in this case. And in Rosenberger, the fact that a state university subsidized the publication of some student newspapers but refused to subsidize a student newspaper with a religious viewpoint was also unconstitutional viewpoint discrimination.

In spite of these decisions, the Second Circuit had ruled in this case that the religious nature of the Good News Club's message meant that it "fell outside the bounds of" speech related to "pure moral and character development", and hence was not entitled to First Amendment protection. The majority on the Supreme Court "disagreed that something that is 'quintessentially religious' or 'decidedly religious in nature' cannot also be characterized properly as the teaching of morals and character development from a particular viewpoint. What matters for purposes of the Free Speech Clause is that we can see no logical difference in kind between the invocation of Christianity by the Club and the invocation of teamwork, loyalty, or patriotism by other associations to provide a foundation for their lessons." Instruction related to morals and values from a religious perspective does not somehow "taint" that instruction so as to alter the viewpoint such instruction takes. Accordingly, Milford's exclusion of the Good News Club constituted unconstitutional viewpoint discrimination.

=== The Establishment Clause claim ===
Milford also argued that its interest in not violating the Establishment Clause justified its excluding the Good News Club from its facilities. In Widmar v. Vincent, 454 U.S. 263 (1981), the Court held that "a state interest in avoiding an Establishment Clause violation may be characterized as compelling, and therefore may justify content-based discrimination" on the part of the state entity. But in Lamb's Chapel, the Court left open the question of whether such a concern could also justify viewpoint discrimination. The Court ruled that it could not, and gave four reasons for distinguishing content-based discrimination from viewpoint discrimination on this score.

First, the exception created in Widmar rested on the fact that the government program was neutral toward religion. "The Good News Club seeks nothing more than to be treated neutrally and given access to speak about the same topics as are other groups." Milford's policy was not neutral with respect to religious speech—it allowed some speech that took a particular viewpoint, but forbade speech that took the same viewpoint on the basis of the religious nature of the speech.

Second, to the extent the Club's speech would be perceived as coercive, that coercion would be felt by the parents rather than the children. After all, parents must give their children permission to attend the Club's activities. Milford did not suggest that the parents would be confused about the religious nature of the Club's message.

Third, and relatedly, the Court's Establishment Clause jurisprudence never "extended ... to foreclose private religious conduct during nonschool hours merely because it takes place on school premises where elementary school children may be present." In Lee v. Weisman, 505 U.S. 577 (1992), the religious speech involved was a prayer at a mandatory high school graduation function. In Santa Fe Independent School District v. Doe, 530 U.S. 290 (2000), the religious speech involved was a student-led prayer before a high school football game which, of course, is a school-sponsored event. In Edwards v. Aguillard, 482 U.S. 578 (1987), the religious speech involved was a prohibition on teaching evolution in public school science classes. Unlike these three cases, the religious speech at issue in this case took place after school and not during a school-sponsored event.

Fourth, the children required their parents permission to attend the Club's activities; they were not permitted to "loiter outside classrooms after the schoolday has ended". The Club was using space on the school grounds into which elementary school children did not typically venture during school hours, and elementary school students of all grade levels attended the Club's activities. The instructors are not schoolteachers. The Court doubted that even small children would perceive that the school was endorsing religion in these circumstances, and that doubt was even more attenuated by the fact that the children were just as likely to perceive official condemnation of religion from the school's excluding the Club from its facilities.

All these considerations suggested that there was no Establishment Clause violation involved in Milford's permitting the Club to meet on its premises after school hours. Accordingly, Milford's fear of an Establishment Clause violation did not justify forbidding the Club from using its facilities.

=== Scalia's concurring opinion ===
Justice Scalia concurred in the Court's opinion, but wrote separately to express his own views. He did not believe that the Club's activities were coercive at all. "As to endorsement, I have previously written that religious expression cannot violate the Establishment Clause where it (1) is purely private and (2) occurs in a traditional or designated public forum, publicly announced and open to all on equal terms. The same is true of private speech that occurs in a limited public forum, publicly announced, whose boundaries are not drawn in favor of religious groups but instead permit a cross-section of uses." Milford could not justify excluding the Club simply because its speech was religious in nature, and so Scalia did not worry whether the discrimination was content-based or viewpoint-based. In any event, Scalia stressed that Milford was engaging in viewpoint discrimination.

=== Breyer's concurring opinion ===
Justice Breyer disputed the majority's assumption that the perception of the children was irrelevant. Even in Lamb's Chapel, the Court had relied in part on the perception of the children in determining whether there had been an Establishment Clause violation. "The critical Establishment Clause question here may well prove to be whether a child, participating in the Good News Club's activities, could reasonably perceive the endorsement of religion" on the part of the school. Breyer pointed out that the Court's decision merely overturned a grant of summary judgment in favor of Milford, and denying summary judgment to one party was not the same as granting it to the other party. Denials of summary judgment simply mean that there are "genuine issues of material fact" that require a trial. The extent of the coercion perceived by the children was, in Breyer's view, one such issue.

== Dissenting opinions ==
For Justice Stevens, speech that embodied a religious purpose fell into three categories. One category included speech that approached a particular topic from a religious perspective. Another category included speech that "amounts to worship, or its equivalent." Between these two categories, Stevens posited a third category—religious proselytizing. This case, then, involved a government entity attempting to open its facilities to allow the first category of religious speech on its property but not the other two categories.

Distinguishing speech from a religious viewpoint, on the one hand, from religious proselytizing, on the other, is comparable to distinguishing meetings to discuss political issues from meetings whose principal purpose is to recruit new members to join a political organization. If a school decides to authorize afterschool discussions of current events in its classrooms, it may not exclude people from expressing their views simply because it dislikes their particular political opinions. But must it therefore allow organized political groups—for example, the Democratic Party, the Libertarian Party, or the Ku Klux Klan—to hold meetings, the principal purpose of which is not to discuss the current-events topic from their own unique point of view but rather to recruit others to join their respective groups? I think not. Such recruiting meetings may introduce divisiveness and tend to separate young children into cliques that undermine the school's educational mission. School officials may reasonably believe that evangelical meetings designed to convert children to a particular religious faith may pose the same risk.

Even if the Club's speech was not properly classified as religious worship, it certainly was religious proselytism, and the school was within its rights to exclude the Club from campus.

Justice Souter was more direct.

It is beyond question that Good News intends to use the public school premises not for the mere discussion of a subject from a particular, Christian point of view, but for an evangelical service of worship calling children to commit themselves in an act of Christian conversion. The majority avoids this reality only by resorting to the bland and general characterization of Good News's activity as 'teaching of morals and character, from a religious standpoint'. If the majority's statement ignores reality, as it surely does, then today's holding may be understood only in equally generic terms. Otherwise, indeed, this case would stand for the remarkable proposition that any public school opened for civic meetings must be opened for use as a church, synagogue, or mosque.

Souter also disputed that it was proper for the Court to reach the Establishment Clause claim. Neither the district court nor the Second Circuit had based their rulings on the Establishment Clause, because they had found no First Amendment violation stemming from Milford's actions. Consequently, the facts relating to the Establishment Clause claim were not as well developed as they otherwise might have been. Furthermore, Souter disagreed that this case was so similar to Widmar and Lamb's Chapel as the majority claimed. Widmar involved a university student group, one of over a hundred on campus, that used university space for religious worship. In that case, Souter pointed out, the risk of the university being seen as endorsing the worship was low in light of the number of student groups on campus and the level of maturity of the students. The film in Lamb's Chapel was open to the general public and aimed at adults, not children, and the school facilities had been used by a wide variety of private organizations, just as there were a large number of student groups in Widmar. The Good News Club, by contrast, began setting up its meetings almost half an hour before the school day ended and in a classroom adjacent to the third- and fourth-grade classroom, so that those students, at least, would see the Club every time it came to campus. In view of the state of the record, the "facts we know (or think we know) point away from the majority's conclusion, and while the consolation may be that nothing really gets resolved when the judicial process is so truncated, that is not much to recommend today's result."

== See also ==
- Support Our Scouts Act (2005)
