= Katherine Stewart (journalist) =

American journalist and author

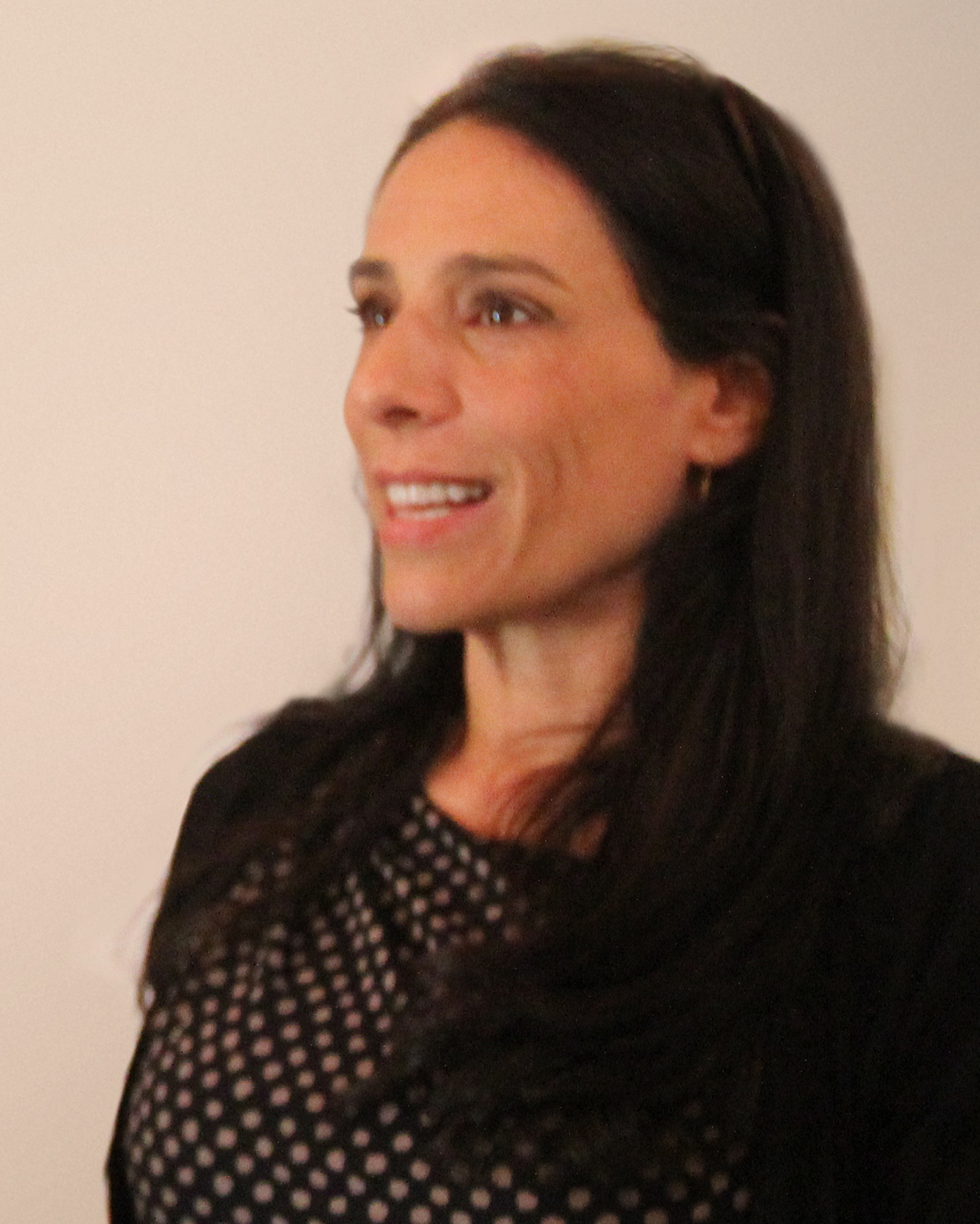
- Stewart in 2013
- Born: Boston, Massachusetts, U.S.
- Citizenship: United States
- Occupations: Journalist; Nonfiction author; Op-ed writer; Novelist
- Writing career
- Language: English
- Years active: 2009-present
- Subjects: Separation of church and state Christian nationalism Religion and politics
- Notable works: The Good News Club (2012); The Power Worshippers (2020)
- Website: katherinestewart.me

Katherine Stewart is an American journalist and author who often writes about issues related to the separation of church and state, the rise of religious nationalism, and global movements against liberal democracy. Her books include The Good News Club: The Christian Right's Stealth Assault on America's Children (2012), The Power Worshippers: Inside the Dangerous Rise of Religious Nationalism (2020), which also served as the basis for the documentary film God & Country (2024); and Money Lies and God: Inside the Movement to Destroy American Democracy.

== Career ==
As a writer and speaker, Stewart has shown interest in controversies over religious freedom and the separation of church and state. She has also written about public and science education, public funding of faith-based initiatives, anti-LGBT initiatives on the state level, faith-based political organizing, the U.S. Supreme Court, homeschooling, and bullying in schools in the U.S.

Stewart began her journalism career working for investigative reporter Wayne Barrett at The Village Voice. Since 2011, she has been an op-ed contributor to The New York Times, writing more than 20 columns. In a March 2020 op-ed, she linked the slow federal response to the country's coronavirus outbreak to President Trump's connections to the far right and anti-science conservatives.

Stewart has contributed pieces to The Guardian, and has written for The American Prospect, George Washington University's History News Network, The Nation, Reuters, The Atlantic, The New Republic,The Daily Beast, Newsweek, Rolling Stone, The New York Observer, Santa Barbara Magazine, The New York Review of Books, and Religion Dispatches.

In 2012, after seeing that group's involvement in her children's public school, Stewart wrote The Good News Club: The Christian Right's Stealth Assault on America's Children. Kirkus described it as "[c]ompelling investigative journalism about an undercovered phenomenon." Alexander Heffner of the Minnesota Star Tribune wrote that the book "exposes the violation of church and state in schools", calling it "an important work" and "a fascinating exposé", and Stewart "a great digger for facts" and "a respectful narrator."

In March 2020, Stewart published The Power Worshippers: Inside the Dangerous Rise of Religious Nationalism, which outlines the decentralized Christian nationalist movement in the U.S. and its grabs for power, linking it to historical movements against abolition, the New Deal, and civil rights. It was reviewed in Foreign Affairs and was excerpted in the New York Review of Books and partially adapted in The New Republic. The Washington Post called it "required reading for anyone who wants to map the continuing erosion of our already fragile wall between church and state". David Austin Walsh in The Baffler wrote that Stewart neglected key right-wing evangelical figures such as Gerald L.K. Smith but that their "absence...is not a fatal omission." She was interviewed on The Brian Lehrer Show, The Majority Report, and for Salon and Sojourners. Power Worshippers also served as the basis for God & Country (2024), a documentary film directed by Dan Partland and produced by Rob Reiner.

== Personal life ==
Stewart was born in Boston, Massachusetts. She is Jewish and her husband was raised Roman Catholic.

== Books ==
=== Nonfiction ===
- Stewart, Katherine (February 2025). Money, Lies, and God (1st ed.). Bloomsbury. ISBN 9781635578546.
- — (March 2020). The Power Worshippers: Inside the Dangerous Rise of Religious Nationalism (1st ed.). New York, NY: Bloomsbury. ISBN 9781635573459.
- — (2012). The Good News Club: The Christian Right's Stealth Assault on America's Children. PublicAffairs. ISBN 978-1-58648-843-7.

=== Fiction ===
- Stewart, Katherine (2006). Class Mothers. Penguin–Berkley. ISBN 9781101220542.
- — (2005). The Yoga Mamas. New York: Penguin–Berkley. ISBN 9780425202630.

== Awards ==
- 2014 Americans United Person of the Year.
- 2020 Morris D. and Selma V. Forkosch Award from the Council for Secular Humanism and the Center for Inquiry, for The Power Worshippers.
- 2021 First Place for Excellence in Nonfiction Books from the Religion News Association, for The Power Worshippers.
- 2024 Freethought Heroine from Freedom From Religion Foundation

== See also ==
- Child evangelism movement
