= Good News Club =

Christian school program

Good News Club is a weekly interdenominational Christian program for 5-to-12-year-old children featuring a Bible lesson, songs, memory verses, and games. It is the leading ministry of Child Evangelism Fellowship (CEF), which creates the curriculum, translates it into different languages for use around the world, and trains instructors to teach it. The foundation has reported that in 2011 there were 3,560 Good News Clubs in public schools across the United States and more than 42,000 clubs worldwide. The Good News Club was the plaintiff in Good News Club v. Milford Central School, which held that the club was entitled to the same access as other groups, like the Boy Scouts, to provide after-school programs designed to promote "moral and character development" to Milford School's elementary children.

== Curriculum ==
Good News Club follows a 5-year curriculum using lesson books and visual aids that describe and illustrate stories from the Old and New Testaments. In the United States, for example, the fall 2011 season featured six lessons from the book "Elijah: Prophet of the Living God" and six lessons from the book "Elisha: Prophet of the Faithful God." Other lesson books featured stories centered on the biblical characters Daniel, Joseph, Joshua, Esther, Moses, King David, and the Apostle Paul. In all, the five-year literature cycle spanned approximately 120 lessons. CEF translates the curriculum into many foreign languages for distribution and use in many of the more than 170 countries in which CEF is active. In those countries, the curriculum cycle lags the English curriculum cycle by one year.

CEF's chief evangelistic tool is the "Wordless Book". CEF's version of the Wordless Book contains five colors: gold, black, red, white, and green, representing heaven, sin, Jesus's crucifixion, righteousness, and growth, respectively. CEF weaves the themes of the Wordless Book into each Good News Club lesson, breaking up each Bible story into sections from which it transitions into, and back out of, the various Wordless Book themes.

Explaining its approach, CEF states that "we are intentional about evangelism" and that "[a]ttention is focused on the lostness of the child without Christ." CEF also states that in order to appropriate salvation, man has a responsibility "to recognize and agree with what God has said about man's sinful condition, thus to see himself as a lost sinner." CEF also asserts that the same requirements pertain to children, because "[t]here are not two gospels--one for adults and another one for children."

CEF maintains a policy that all children attending Good News Clubs must first have written permission from a parent or legal guardian, who understand that the content of the club is taught from a biblical worldview.

== History ==
=== Formation ===
Good News Club has roots dating back to the early 1920s, when CEF's founder J. Irvin Overholtzer launched the "Children's Home Bible Class" movement in the Bay Area of San Francisco. According to his CEF-published biography, Overholtzer sought to reach five classes of children: “those completely outside the church; those in liberal Sunday Schools; those of other faiths and cults; isolated foreign or minority groups; and unsaved in evangelical churches.” At first, the classes were held in churches near public schools, and scheduled to start immediately after the closing bell, in order to "gather as many children as possible of grade-school age into the class." Later, the classes were held "in a good Christian home which had the respect of the neighborhood."

Initially, Overholtzer's Home Bible Class Movement spread slowly: to northern California, to Washington State and later to Chicago, Illinois, where Mr. Overholtzer gained the attention and support of leaders of the Moody Bible Institute, the Moody Church, and other area ministries. In 1936, the movement gained national credence when articles and editorials were published in the Sunday School Times, The King's Business, Moody Monthly, and Revelation. In 1937, Overholtzer and leaders of Moody Bible Institute, The Bible Institute of Los Angeles (now Biola University), and Wheaton College formally organized Child Evangelism Fellowship (CEF) at a meeting in Los Angeles, California.

=== Curriculum development ===
CEF's Home Bible Class Movement spread rapidly. For example, by 1946 there were 968 Home Bible Classes in Southern California alone. At first, CEF encouraged instructors to use Bible lesson materials printed by the Scripture Press. In March 1942, CEF launched Child Evangelism Magazine, each issue of which included a full children's Bible lesson with colored flannelgraph cutouts. Over the next 15 years, CEF developed an entire series of lessons, organized it into a 5-year curriculum cycle, and renamed the home study bible class the "Good News Club."

Overholtzer touted the fundamentalist credentials of his organization in his short 1955 biography entitled The Children's Home Bible Class Movement:

1. The organization was to be fundamental, of course, thoroughly interdenominational, but by individuals and not churches.
2. It was to cooperate with every fundamental organization but to be utterly independent.
3. Every city and town was to have an organization affiliated with state, national, and finally an international organization.
4. A fundamental statement of faith was to be adopted and enforced.

Good News Club lesson book author Ruth Overholtzer, wife of J. Irvin Overholtzer, also expressed her enthusiasm for The Fundamentals in her autobiography. Describing her experience of being a college student of Biola dean Reuben Torrey, Ruth wrote: “How could any of us who had the privilege of hearing this author at eleven a.m. each weekday morning teaching from his own book, ever, the rest of our lives, be ‘foggy about the fundamentals’? I was a blotter soaking up great Bible truths.” Ruth credited Torrey's instruction with providing the formative content of Good News Club's lessons: "the great doctrines of the Bible which I had studied under Dr. Torrey began to form themselves into simple doctrinal lessons for children."

=== Expansion ===
As Good News Clubs spread through neighborhood homes across the United States, it began to make inroads into a handful of public schools. At least as early as 1961, CEF's articles of incorporation recited that its purpose included "conducting Bible study and evangelistic meetings for children in public schools and elsewhere." A 1961 Daytona Beach Morning Journal article reported a Dade County, Florida state court ruling that held that an after-hours Good News Club in school buildings violated constitutional boundaries between church and state. Articles from the 1970s through the 1980s reported Good News Clubs in a handful of public schools. A 1996 Eugene Register-Guard article reported that most of Oregon’s 250 then-existing Good News Clubs participated in Oregon’s “release time” program. In the 1990s, CEF filed several lawsuits against school districts, claiming equal access rights to organize Good News Clubs in public elementary schools. That litigation culminated in the landmark 2001 Supreme Court decision of Good News Club v. Milford Central School, 533 U.S. 98 (2001), which held in favor of CEF.

After its Milford victory, CEF began an initiative to move Good News Clubs from neighborhood homes into public elementary schools. It launched an "Adopt-A-School" program to recruit evangelical "church partners" to open clubs in public elementary schools and train their volunteers. In 2002, only about 1000 out of nearly 4800 clubs met in public schools. By 2011, over 3500 out of nearly 5000 clubs met in public schools. CEF reports that it "hopes to one day have a Good News Club in every elementary school in America."

== Criticism ==
Good News Club has been criticized for making inroads into public elementary schools that blur the distinction between church and state and for masking its goal of proselytizing children. Since its 2001 Supreme Court victory, CEF has filed and won dozens of lawsuits against school districts that resisted opening up its classrooms or communication channels (e.g., flyer distribution programs) to Good News Club. During the Bush administration, the Justice Department worked closely with CEF on many of these cases, filing amicus briefs at both the trial and appellate levels.

In 2012, journalist Katherine Stewart published The Good News Club: The Christian Right’s Stealth Assault on America’s Children, describing the local controversy that erupted when Good News Club came to Seattle's Loyal Heights Elementary School and chronicling what she learned as an undercover reporter at CEF's triennial National Convention in 2010. Separately, Stewart has reported on complaints by parents of children of other faiths being warned, by their Good News Club classmates, that they may go to hell, and of Good News Club's teaching, as an object lesson on obedience, of I Samuel 15:3's divine imperative to "attack the Amalekites" and "put to death men and women, children and infants." Stewart clarifies the fundamentalist and Christian nationalist nature of CEF and the Good News Club. She emphasizes that "religious fundamentalists want to be in the public schools because they want to "take back" the public schools and repurpose them with a fundamentalist Christian agenda. Young children cannot distinguish between an activity that takes place in their public school and one that is endorsed by their public school. They think if something happens in the school, it must have the stamp of state authority, it must be what the school wants them to believe, it must be what they should believe.... That's why these Good News Clubs ... are so intent on getting their programs in the public schools."

A rival group opposing the Good News Club was formed and was called "The Better News Club". This was reported in a 2015 Washington Post article, in which a spokesman told the reporter "we don’t want to use the same tactics as the Good News Club by telling them what to think,” stating that they would concentrate on science-based critical thinking and not set out to debunk religious claims.

In 2016 another rival group, After School Satan, was founded by Lucien Greaves of the atheist group The Satanic Temple. According to Greaves:

It’s critical that children understand that there are multiple perspectives on all issues, and that they have a choice in how they think... "Satan" is just a "metaphorical construct" intended to represent the rejection of all forms of tyranny over the human mind.
