= Child Evangelism Fellowship =

Interdenominational Christian organization

- Founded: 1937
- Founder: Jesse Irvin Overholtzer
- Type: 501(c)(3) non-profit religious
- Location: Warrenton, Missouri, US (World HQ)
- Region served: US, 176 countries
- President: Jeremiah Cho
- Key people: Reese Kauffman, president emeritus
- Employees: 3,528 (full-time)
- Volunteers: 40,000 (US and Canada)
- Website: www.cefonline.com

Child Evangelism Fellowship (CEF) is an international interdenominational Christian nonprofit organization founded by Jesse Irvin Overholtzer (1877–1955) in 1937 at Berachah Church in Cheltenham, Pennsylvania, which, after a split, one moved and headquartered in Warrenton, Missouri, United States, while the other part headquartered in Harrisburg, Pennsylvania, United States. The organization lists its purpose as teaching the Christian Gospel to children and encouraging children's involvement in local Christian churches. It has programs established in all US states and in 192 countries, with 733 full-time workers in the US, an estimated 40,000 volunteers in the US and Canada, and over 1,200 missionaries overseas, approximately 1,000 of them national workers, individuals trained with CEF but local to the country of their service. During the reporting year ending December 2014, CEF reported teaching more than 19.9 million children, mostly through face-to-face ministry. CEF is a charter member of the Evangelical Council for Financial Accountability (ECFA).

CEF branched to Europe in 1947 when Bernard and Harriet Swanson (from the US) began work in Gothenburg, Sweden. CEF soon spread across Europe, most notably in Northern Ireland from 1950. The headquarters of CEF Europe are in Romania, with its missionaries trained at different centers across Europe.

In 2026, CEF was declared an undesirable organization in Russia.

== Elk River case ==
In 2007-2008, Elk River, Minnesota's board of education prohibited Child Evangelism Fellowship from distributing materials during open houses in that district's schools. CEF took the matter to the U.S. District Court, where in February, 2009, Judge Ann Montgomery ruled that the school district's order deprived CEF of its freedom of speech rights. She went on to say that the school district could still prevent the group from distributing materials if it adopted a policy of closing the schools to all such groups, which the school district did in March 2009.

== Criticism ==
In her 2012 book The Good News Club: The Christian Right's Stealth Assault on America's Children, journalist Katherine Stewart criticizes various practices of the Good News Club after-school Bible study program, including young participants being rewarded for recruiting friends of other faiths and denominations whose parents have not enrolled them in the program. She also claimed in an article in The Guardian that the lesson plan for the Old Testament narrative in 1 Samuel 15, describing the divinely ordered slaughter of the Amalekites, is used to justify genocide. However, CEF president Reese Kauffmann responded to her accusations in a letter, stating:

The story of Saul and the Amalekites (1 Samuel 15:3) is found in any version or edition of the Bibles of the Jewish, Catholic and Protestant faiths since the first manuscripts were inscribed. Only a misinterpretation of the cited passage could be used to buttress genocide. The goal of Child Evangelism Fellowship is the proper teaching of this passage, which is not an instruction in genocide. Though truly many brutal acts appear in both the Old and New Testaments, including the torture and crucifixion of Jesus by the Romans, nothing could be more un-Christian than the promotion of genocide of any group of human beings under the New Covenant introduced to the world by Jesus Christ. CEF and the Good News Clubs would never teach children that God would instruct them, or anyone today, to commit genocide.

Kauffman's response elicited the following rebuttal:

Though I welcome Mr Kauffman's comments, I regret to note that he seems to be unfamiliar with his group's teaching materials. Nowhere in the lesson plan on the Amalekites does the CEF mention the "New Covenant" and its prohibition on genocide. Mr Kauffman claims the CEF "would never teach children that God would instruct them, or anyone today, to commit genocide". And yet the CEF's lesson plan on the Amalekites tells children that God wanted Saul "to go and completely destroy the Amalekites – people, animals, every living thing". It also repeatedly tells children that the Amalekites deserved punishment for their "sinful unbelief". To be precise, the thrust of the CEF's lesson is to teach obedience – that if God tells you to kill unbelievers, or do anything else for that matter, you must do exactly as he says. "King Saul should have been willing to seek God for strength to obey completely," the lesson plan on the Amalekites reads, and in three separate places it instructs teachers, "Have children shout 'God will help you obey!'"

== See also ==
- Awana
- Child evangelism movement

== Bibliography ==
- Rusten, E. Michael & Sharon O. (2005). The Complete Book of When and Where. Tyndale House. p. 434. ISBN 0-8423-5508-1.
- Anthony, Michael J.; et al. (2007). Perspectives on Children's Spiritual Formation. B&H Publishing Group. pp. 136–158. ISBN 978-0-8054-4186-4.
- Balmer, Randall Herbert (2004). Encyclopedia of Evangelicalism. Baylor University Press. p. 153. ISBN 1-932792-04-X.
- Wrenn, Bruce, Philip Kotler, Norman Shawchuck (2009). Building Strong Congregations: Attracting, Serving, and Developing Your Membership. Autumn House Publishing. pp. 102–104. ISBN 978-0-8127-0490-7.
