= Audio player =

Audio player or audio device may refer to:

- Cassette player, a piece of hardware for playing audio cassettes
- CD player, an electronic device that plays audio compact discs
- Digital audio player, a piece of hardware for playing audio files
- Audio player (software), a piece of computer software for playing audio files
- MP3 player, a digital audio player

== See also ==
- Audio receiver
- AV receiver
- Boombox
- Hearing aid
- HiFi
- High-end audio
- Music centre
- Portable media player
- Radiogram
- Shelf stereo
- Table radio
- Tuner
- Vehicle audio
- Walkman
