= Sound system =

Sound system or audio system may refer to:

== Technology media ==
- Amplifier
- Audio equipment
- Audio power amplifier
- High fidelity, a sound system intended for accurate reproduction of music in the home
- Home audio
- Home cinema
- Public address system, an institutional speech-reinforcement or public safety announcement system
- Shelf stereo, a compact sound system for personal use
- Sound reinforcement system, a system for amplifying audio for an audience
- Vehicle audio

== Arts and entertainment ==
- Sound system (DJ), a group of disc jockeys performing together
- Sound system (Jamaican), a group of disc jockeys, engineers and MCs playing ska, rocksteady or reggae music
- Sound System Records, an Australian record label
- LCD Soundsystem, an American rock band
- Sound System (album), by The Clash
- Sound System: The Final Releases, a 2021 EP by Bad Gyal
- Sound-System (album), by Herbie Hancock
- Soundsystem (311 album), 1999
- "Sound System", a song by Operation Ivy

== See also ==
- Audio player
- Phonology, the study of sound systems of languages
