= Durabrand =

Private label tradename of Walmart

Brand logo

Durabrand was a private label tradename of Walmart, which was introduced in early 1999. It was previously available in the UK through ASDA as a replacement for the Pacific brand name.

== Introduction ==
Durabrand was first started in early 1999 as a brand only made for Wal-Mart stores as a generic brand for electronics, but has grown to be available near-internationally (due to Wal-Mart's global reach).

Wal-Mart Germany was the first country to introduce the private label with a lineup in Consumer Electronics. Responsible for the first launch in 1999 were Uwe Bremeyer (Senior Buyer Dept. 5) and Michael Werry (Buyer Dept. 5), since 2002 Martin Schulz (Senior Buyer Dept. 5) & Frank Mades (Divisional Merchandise Manager Electronics) for Wal-Mart Germany. The very first product launched was a 120 min Videocassette produced at RAKS in Manisa (Turkey).

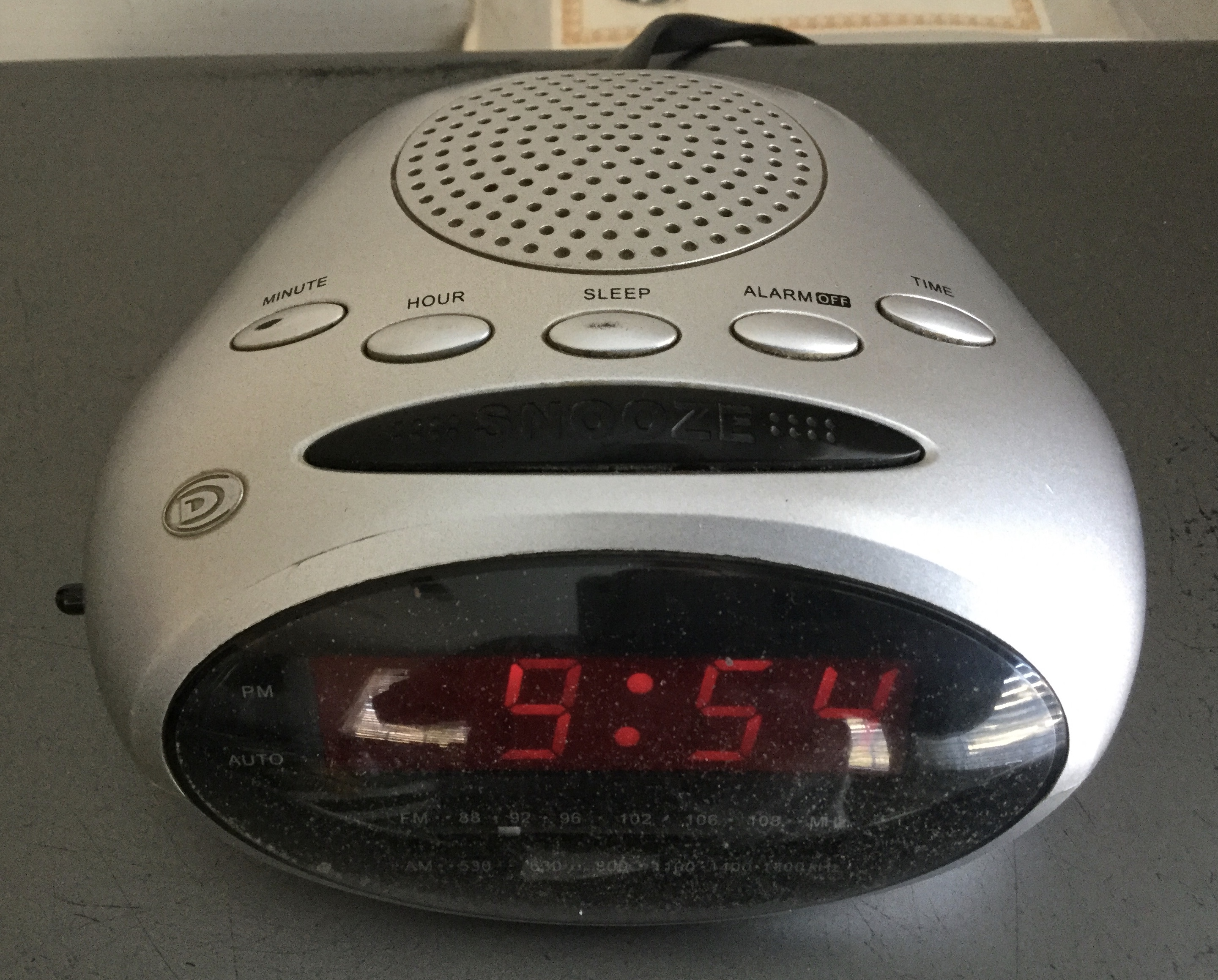
AM-FM alarm-clock radio

The products are marked for only Wal-Mart stores and available in very few other stores than Wal-Mart. Like most generic brands, Durabrand is a chain of different manufacturers. Durabrand is chained with Lenoxx Sound, Alco, Funai (which would also include Emerson, Sylvania, and Symphonic), Orion, Maxell, Resonance, Initial Technology, and many other different companies. The prices of a majority of their products are often considered loss leaders.

Durabrand does have some "company rivals," despite the low prices, their products are matched up between other in-house brands like Wal-Mart's iLo brand (considered as an upmarket brand, offers MP3 digital audio players and plasma video displays), Target's TruTech brand; and to an extent, K-Mart's former Curtis Mathes/White-Westinghouse (in the mid-to-late 1990s) now Home Essentials brand. Due to the fact that all of these are store brands, the stores are often competitive to get buyers to their store brand. Aside from store brands, Durabrand is matched up to Coby Electronics, Jwin, GPX, and other low-cost electronics brands. Durabrand offers audio equipment (CD players, alarm clocks, boomboxes, theater systems) and video equipment (VCRs, DVD players, televisions). However, it has also been lately focused on home appliances such as kitchen equipment, telephones, vacuums, and other general home appliances.

Since the early 2010s, the brand appears to have been phased out, with the Onn brand being used for consumer electronics and the Mainstays brand being used on home appliances.

== Products ==
- Media (CD-R, CD-RW, DVD-R, DVD-RW, and blank VHS tapes)
- VCRs
- Home minisystems and home-theater-in-a-box systems
- Boomboxes: Durabrand sells a variety of boomboxes. The offerings range from an AM/FM radio with a single-deck cassette player to models featuring CD players and some models with MP3-CD compatibility.
- CD players (with and without ESP): Durabrand has variety in portable CD players. Ranging from the basic models without anti-skip protection to models with a built in radio tuner, MP3 CD compatibility, or come supplied with a car kit - consisting of a 12 Volt DC adapter and signal-to-cassette adapter.
- DVD Players: There are three different types of DVD player that Durabrand sells. One type is the component DVD player that is connects to a TV with A/V inputs (due to being a fire hazard, this product was recalled on August 20, 2009). Another design is a clamshell design portable DVD player (similar to a notebook computer). And a car DVD player "system" that can have up to two screens mounted on rear seats.
- Televisions: Durabrand used to sell monochrome portable televisions (sourced from Lenoxx Electronics Corporation) as well as color televisions.
- Home Appliances: Home appliances include vacuums, hand mixers, coffee makers, wine coolers and other general home equipment.
- Telephones: Basic models, models with Caller ID and answering systems.
- Car audio: speakers and sets
- Computer speakers
- Coffee makers
- Toasters
- Two-way radios
- Cordless Vacuum Cleaners

== Brand identification ==
A large D is often found on the front of their products. Silver and black are the predominant colors used on their products.

== Product manufacturers ==
- Most portable CD players and other audio equipment are currently sourced from distributor/supplier Lenoxx Sound.
- Larger stereo systems are often sourced from Alco.
- Televisions were sourced from Orion, currently sourced from Funai Electric.
- Blank media currently sourced from Maxell and Plasmon Data Systems.
- Car audio currently sourced from Resonance.
- Some DVD players are sourced from Initial Technology, but some models are also sourced from Lenoxx Sound and Venturer.
