= Broadcast radio receiver =

Radio receiver for public reception

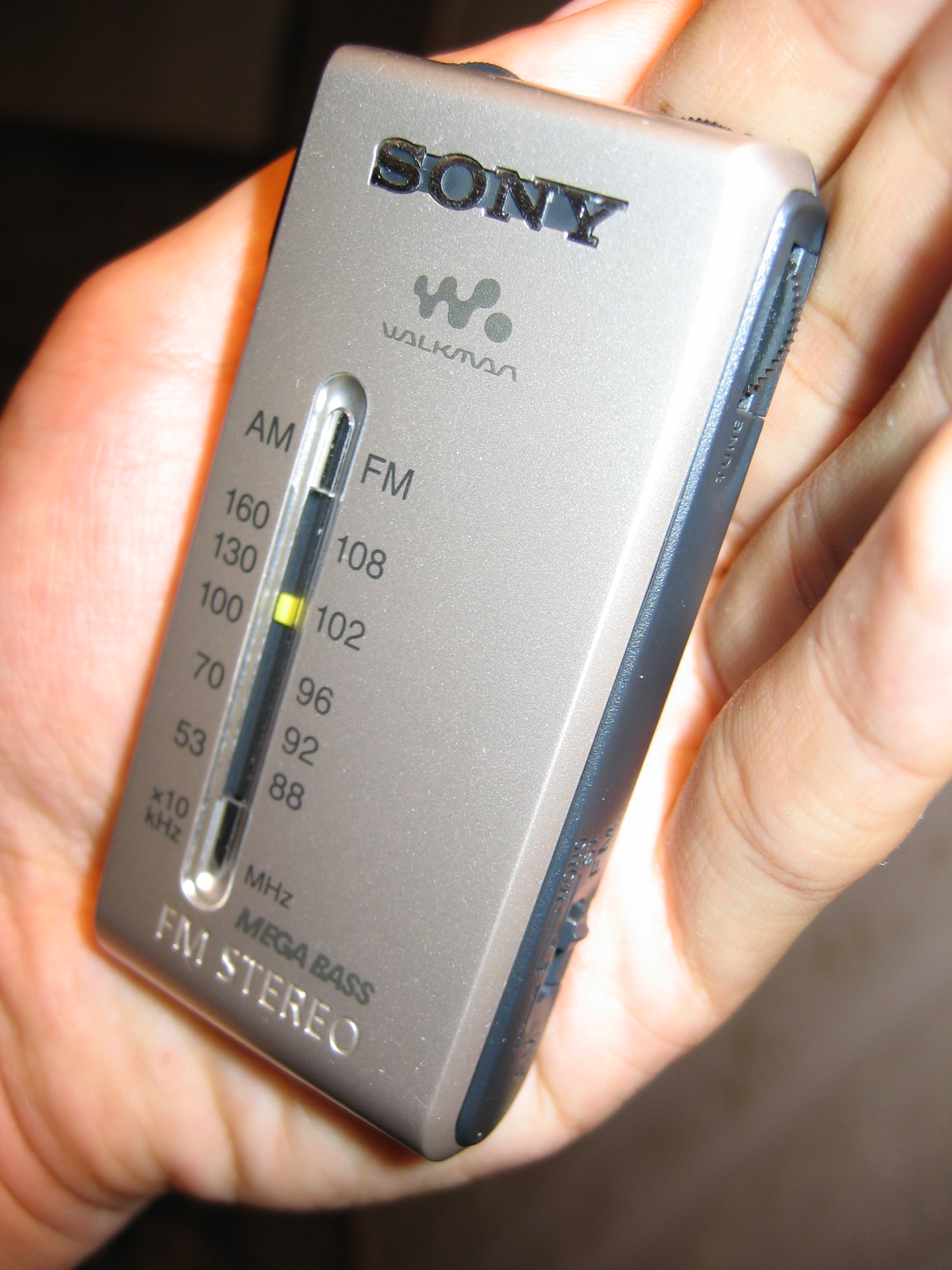
A portable battery-powered AM/FM broadcast receiver, used to listen to audio broadcast by local radio stations.

The most familiar form of radio receiver is a broadcast radio receiver, often just called a broadcast receiver or simply a radio, as used for radio broadcasting. It receives audio programs intended for public reception transmitted by local radio stations. The sound is reproduced either by a loudspeaker in the radio or an earphone which plugs into a jack on the radio. The radio requires electric power, provided either by batteries inside the radio or a power cord which plugs into an electric outlet. All radios have a volume control to adjust the loudness of the audio, and some type of "tuning" control to select the radio station to be received.

== Modulation types ==
Modulation is the process of adding information to a radio carrier wave.

=== AM and FM ===
Two types of modulation are used in analog radio broadcasting systems; AM and FM.

In amplitude modulation (AM) the amplitude of the radio signal is varied by the audio signal. AM broadcasting is allowed in the AM broadcast bands which are between 148 and 283 kHz in the longwave range, and between 526 and 1706 kHz in the medium frequency (MF) range of the radio spectrum. AM broadcasting is also permitted in shortwave bands, between about 2.3 and 26 MHz, which are used for long distance international broadcasting.

In frequency modulation (FM), the frequency of the radio signal is varied slightly by the audio signal. FM broadcasting is permitted in the FM broadcast bands between about 65 and 108 MHz in the very high frequency (VHF) range. The exact frequency ranges vary somewhat in different countries.

FM stereo radio stations broadcast in stereophonic sound (stereo), transmitting two sound channels representing left and right microphones. A stereo receiver contains the additional circuits and parallel signal paths to reproduce the two separate channels. A monaural receiver, in contrast, only receives a single audio channel that is a combination (sum) of the left and right channels. While AM stereo transmitters and receivers exist, they have not achieved the popularity of FM stereo.

Most modern radios are able to receive both AM and FM radio stations, and have a switch to select which band to receive; these are called AM/FM radios.

=== Digital audio broadcasting (DAB) ===
Digital Audio Broadcasting (DAB) is an advanced radio technology which debuted in some countries in 1998 that transmits audio from terrestrial radio stations as a digital signal rather than an analog signal as AM and FM do. Its advantages are that DAB has the potential to provide higher quality sound than FM (although many stations do not choose to transmit at such high quality), has greater immunity to radio noise and interference, makes better use of scarce radio spectrum bandwidth, and provides advanced user features such as electronic program guide, sports commentaries, and image slideshows. Its disadvantage is that it is incompatible with previous radios so that a new DAB receiver must be purchased. As of 2017, 38 countries offer DAB, with 2,100 stations serving listening areas containing 420 million people. The United States and Canada have chosen not to implement DAB.

DAB radio stations work differently from AM or FM stations: a single DAB station transmits a wide 1,500 kHz bandwidth signal that carries from 9 to 12 channels from which the listener can choose. Broadcasters can transmit a channel at a range of different bit rates, so different channels can have different audio quality. In different countries DAB stations broadcast in either Band III (174–240 MHz) or L band (1.452–1.492 GHz).

== Types ==
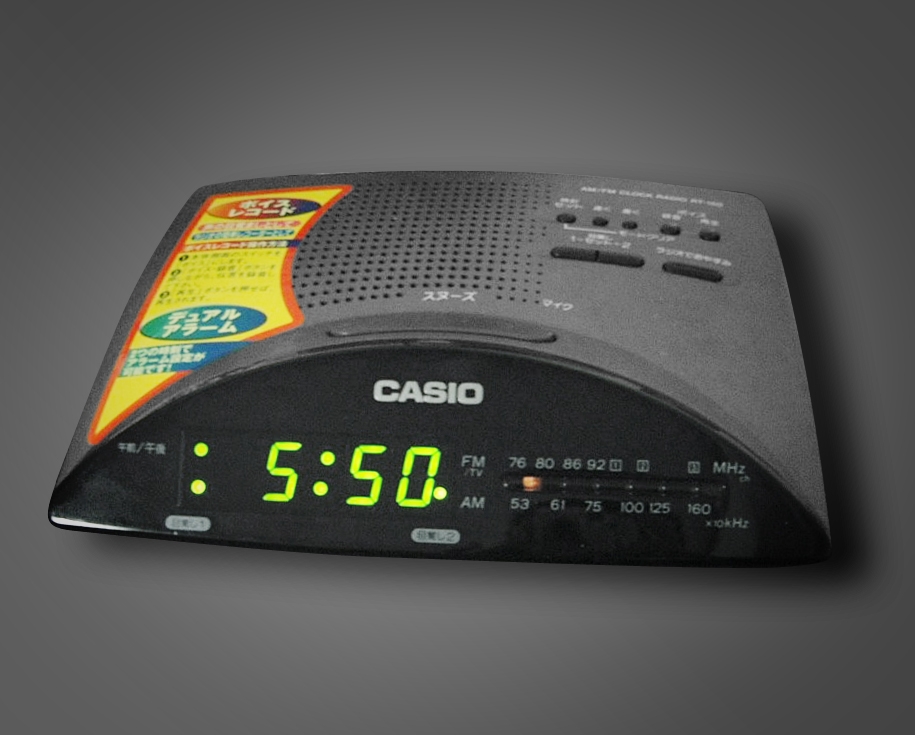
A bedside clock radio that combines a radio receiver with an alarm clock

Radios are manufactured in a range of styles and functions:

- Console radio - A self-contained radio with speaker designed to stand on the floor.
- Table radio also called a "Mantel radio" - A self-contained radio with speaker designed to sit on a table, cabinet, or fireplace mantel. Table radios typically plug into a wall outlet, although some "cordless" battery powered table radios exist.
- Clock radio - A bedside table radio that also includes an alarm clock. The alarm clock can be set to turn on the radio in the morning instead of an alarm, to wake the owner.
- Tuner - A high fidelity AM/FM radio receiver in a component home audio system. It has no speakers but outputs an audio signal which is fed into the system and played through the system's speakers.
- Portable radio - a radio powered by batteries that can be carried with a person. Radios are now often integrated with other audio sources in CD players and portable media players. Portable radios typically are small enough to be hand held, or, for larger radios, have a handle or carrying strap. Portable radios may have an arrangement for powering from an outlet, conserving the batteries when an outlet is available. Portable "emergency" radios may be solar and/or hand crank powered.
  - Boombox - a portable battery-powered high fidelity stereo sound system in the form of a box with a handle, which became popular during the mid-1970s.
  - Transistor radio - an older term for a portable pocket-sized broadcast radio receiver. Made possible by the invention of the transistor and developed in the 1950s, transistor radios were hugely popular during the 1960s and early 1970s, and changed the public's listening habits.
- Car radio - A radio integrated into the dashboard of a vehicle, used for entertainment while driving. Virtually all modern cars and trucks are equipped with radios, which usually also includes a CD player.
- Satellite radio receiver - subscription radio receiver that receives audio programming from a direct broadcast satellite. The subscriber must pay a monthly fee. They are mostly designed as car radios.
- Shortwave receiver - This is a broadcast radio that also receives the shortwave bands. It is used for shortwave listening.
- An AV or Stereo receiver (in context often just called a receiver) is a component in a hi-fi or home theatre system combining a radio and audio amplifier in one unit that connects to the speakers and often to other input and output components (e.g. turntable, television, tape deck, and CD and DVD players)
