= Lenoxx Electronics Corporation =

American electronics distributor

Lenoxx
- Company type: Public label
- Industry: Consumer electronics and private labels
- Founded: 1986
- Headquarters: Carteret, New Jersey, United States
- Key people: Morris Fuchs-sales
- Products: Audio and video electronics
- Website: www.lenoxx.com at the Wayback Machine (archived 12 October 1999)

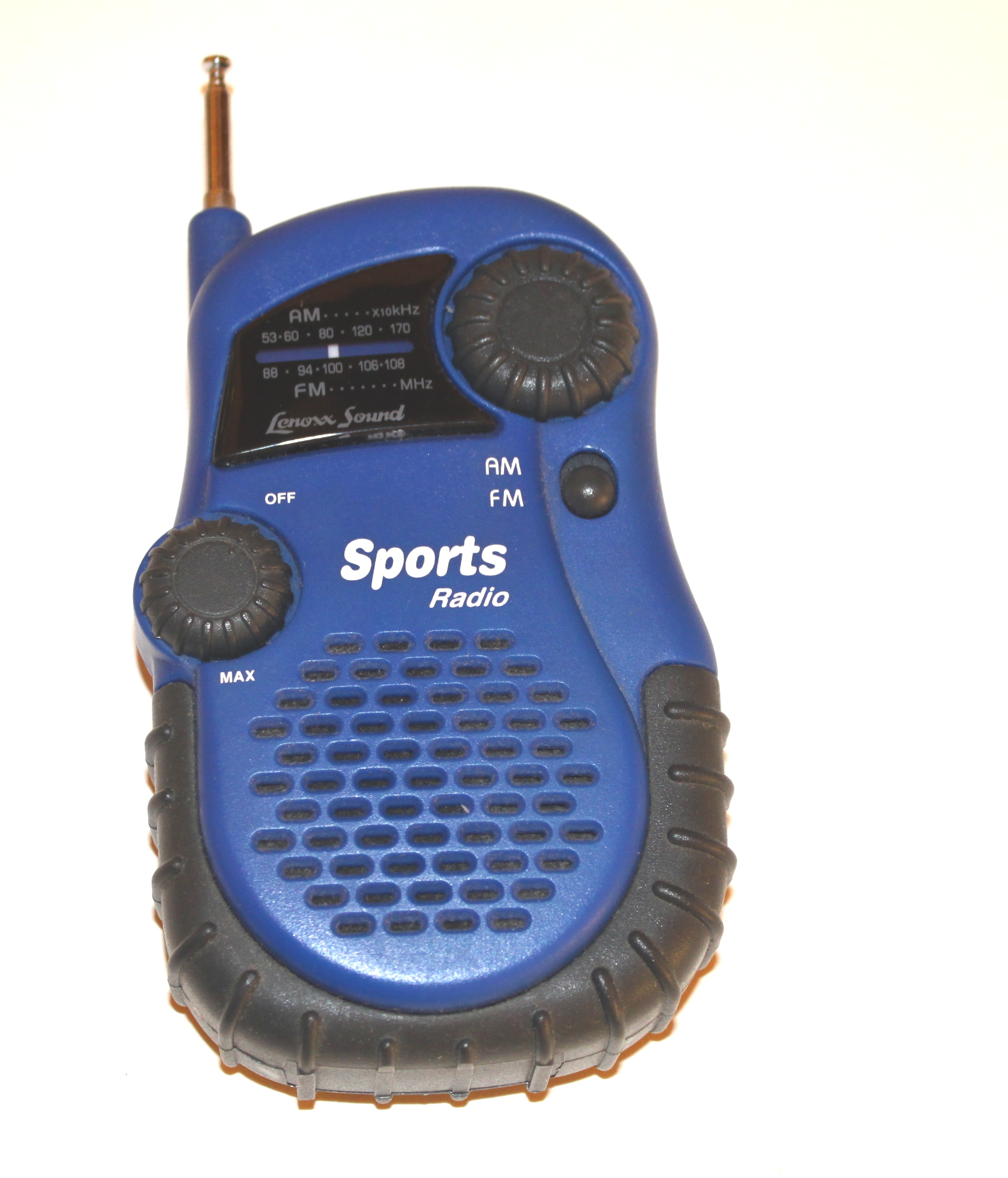
Lenoxx Sound portable AM/FM radio

Lenoxx Electronics Corporation was an American distributor of electronic equipment. The brand appeared in the late 1980s as a transportable stereo (boombox) model.

Products from this company bear more than one brand. Common examples are Durabrand (Sold by Wal-Mart since early 2003), and Audio Solutions (sold by Walgreens). They also sell with their own name Lenoxx Sound. Market position is at the low end with products rarely over $80. The company's products are often sold at discount and drug stores, but rarely in other markets.

Bernard Fuchs was the company's Chief Executive Officer.

Lenoxx Electronics Corporation operated only in the United States and some countries in Europe, and should not be confused with Lenoxx Electronics of Australia, however, some Lenoxx products were sold in Australia under the name "Altec".

== Products ==
- Portable Compact Disc players
- CD Radio-Cassette Transportable Stereos (Boomboxes)
- Portable Televisions
- TV sets with screen size up to 21 inches (crt) or up to 26/32 inches (lcd) in some markets.
- Portable Cassette
- Portable AM/FM Radio
- Alarm Clock Radio
- Telephones
- Home Theatre Systems
- PC speakers
- DVD players
- Compact hi-fi stereo systems.
