= Tuner (radio) =

Frequency selection subsystem for various receiver systems

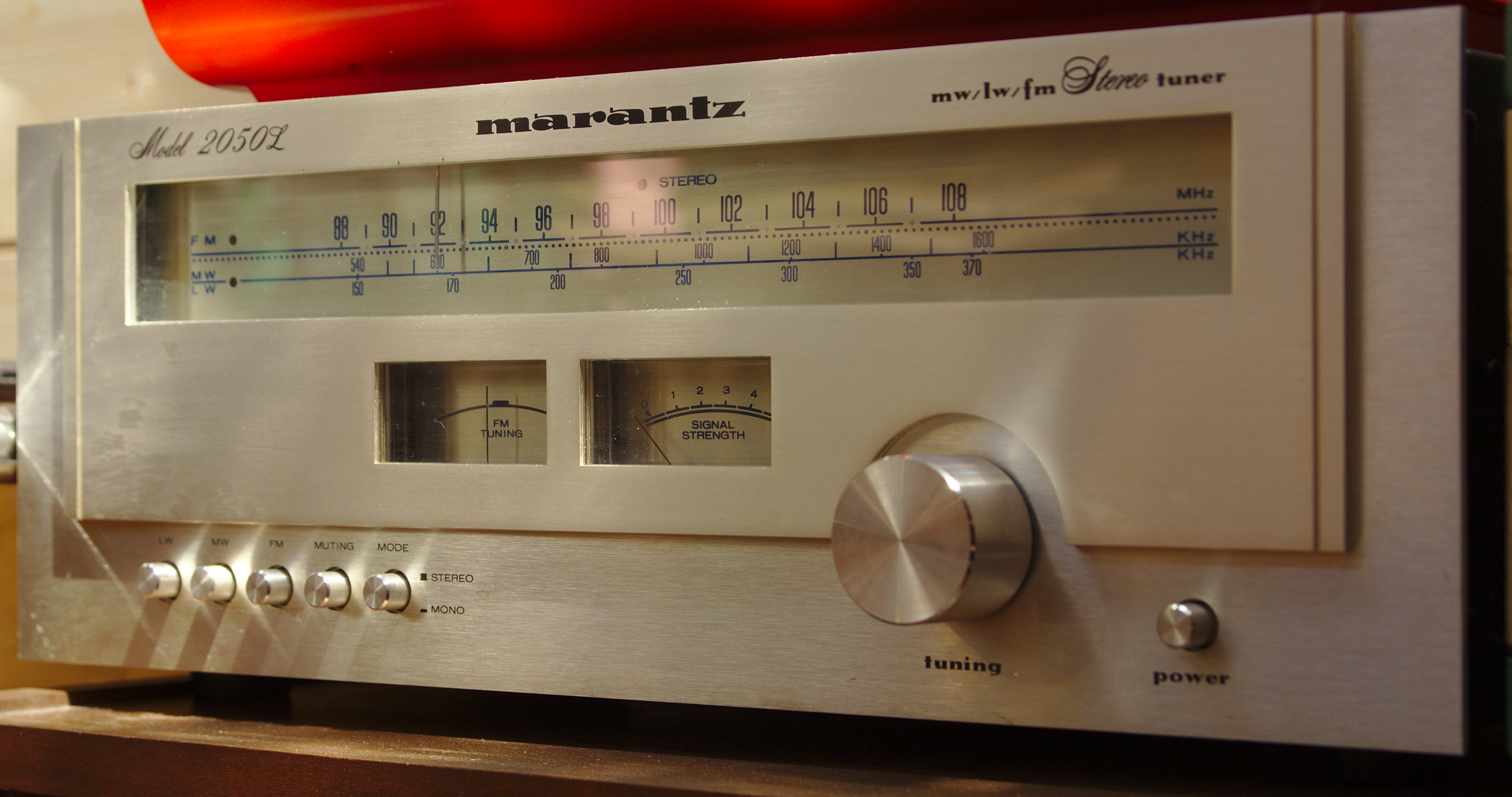
Marantz 2050L AM/FM stereo tuner (USA; 1978–1980)

In electronics and radio, a tuner is a type of receiver subsystem that selects, receives and demodulates radio transmissions, such as AM or FM broadcasts, and converts the received signal into a form suitable for further processing or output, such as to an amplifier or loudspeaker.

The verb tuning in radio contexts means adjusting the receiver to detect the desired radio signal carrier frequency that a particular radio station uses.

A tuner is also a standalone home audio product, component, or device called an AM/FM tuner or a stereo tuner that is part of a hi-fi or stereo system, or a TV tuner for television broadcasts. Tuners were a major consumer electronics product in the 20th century but in practice are often integrated into other products in the modern day, such as stereo or AV receivers or portable radios.

== Design history and overview ==
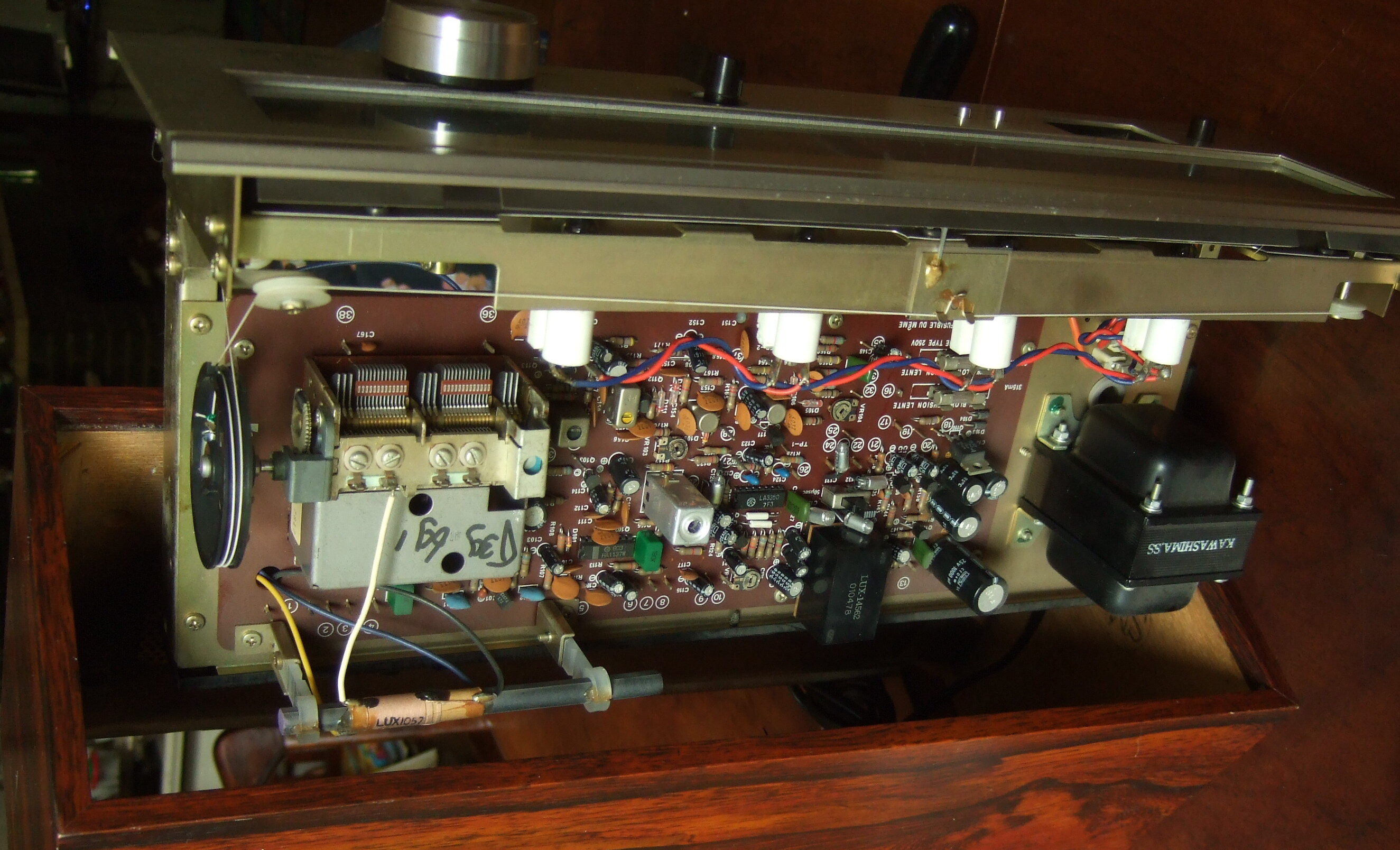
inside view, Luxman T-34

The primary goal of a tuner's design is to exclude noise and amplify the wanted signal. Tuners may be monophonic or stereophonic, and generally output left and right channels of sound. Tuners generally include a tuning knob or keypad to adjust the frequency, i.e. the intended radio station, measured in megahertz (e.g., 101.1 MHz). Mistuning is the greatest source of distortion in FM reception. Some models realize manual tuning by means of mechanically operated ganged variable capacitors. Often, several sections are provided on a tuning capacitor to tune several stages of the receiver in tandem, or to allow switching between different frequency bands. A later method used a potentiometer supplying a variable voltage to varactor diodes in the local oscillator and tank circuits of the front-end tuner, for electronic tuning. Modern radio tuners use a superheterodyne receiver with tuning selected by adjustment of the frequency of a local oscillator. This system shifts the radio frequency of interest to a fixed frequency so that it can be tuned with a fixed-frequency band-pass filter. Still later, frequency synthesizer then software-defined radio methods were used, with microprocessor control.

The crystal radio receiver is the simplest kind of radio receiver or tuner, and was the basis for the first commercially successful type of radio. Inexpensive and reliable, it was sold in millions of units and became popular in kits used by hobbyists, and was a major factor in the popularity of radio broadcasting around 1920. The crystal radio consists of an antenna, a variable inductor and a variable capacitor connected in parallel. This creates a tank circuit which responds to one resonant frequency. This is then combined with a detector, also known as a demodulator (diode D1 in the circuit).

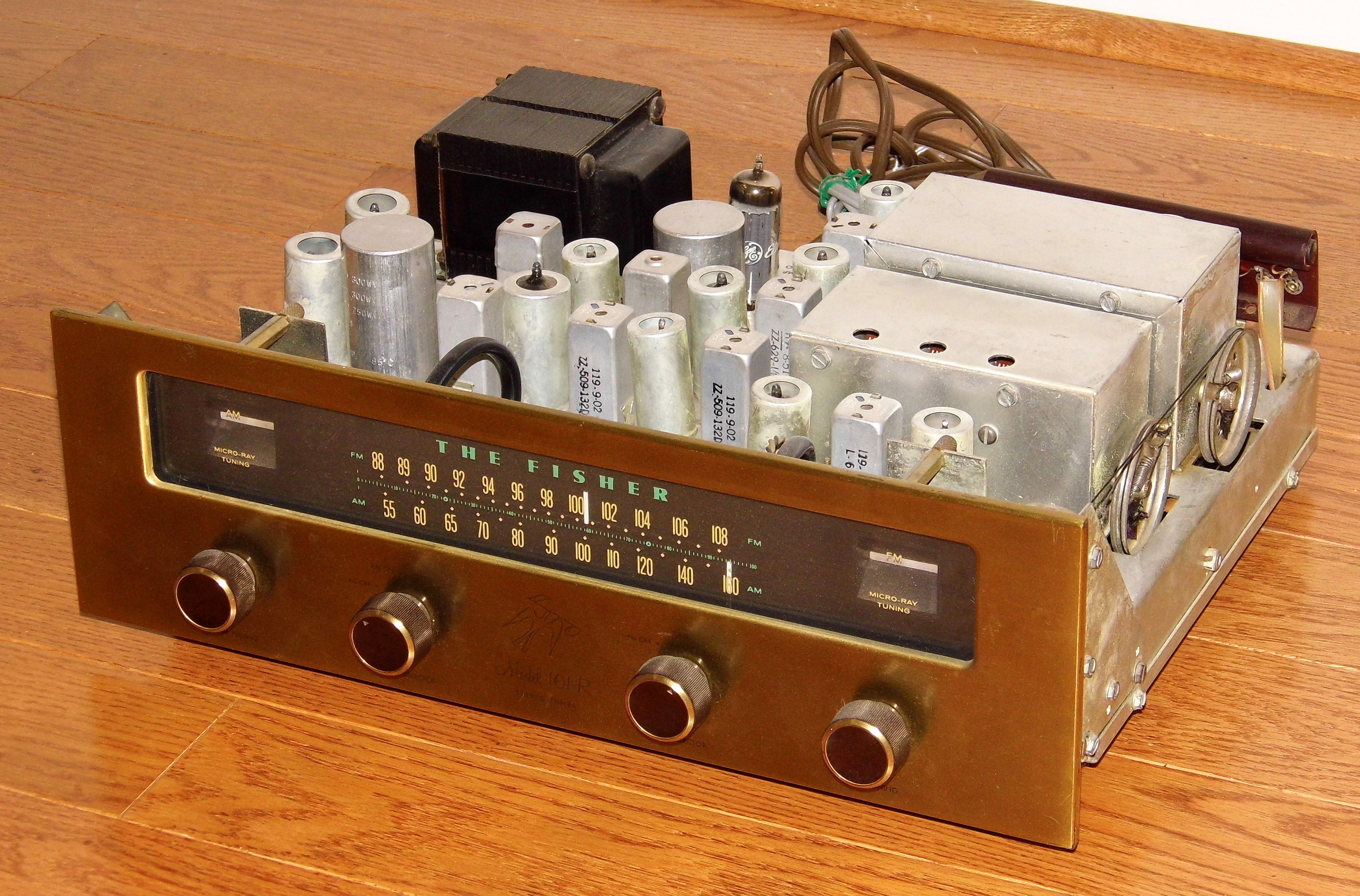
Fisher 101-R AM/FM tuner, 15 vacuum tubes (USA; 1959)

Vacuum tubes made crystal sets obsolete in the 1920s due to their effective amplification. From the 1920s until the 1960s, most tuners used a vacuum tube-based design. The radiogram, which combined a gramophone with a radio, was a predecessor of the hi-fi tuner.

The transistor was invented in 1947 and largely replaced tubes. Manufacturing shifted to solid state electronics in the 1960s, but this didn't always result in improved sound quality compared to the older tube tuners. Starting in the 1960s, Japanese transistor radios, which were cheaper despite their crudeness compared to American designs, began to outcompete the American products in the portable radio market. Eventually, after switching from germanium to silicon transistors, the Japanese consumer electronics companies achieved a dominant market position. Heathkit, an American company that had supplied popular kits for electronic devices since the 1940s, went out of business in 1980.

FM broadcasting originated in the United States and was adopted as a worldwide standard. FM broadcasting in stereo in the USA began in 1961 when authorized by the FCC. This led to greater demand for new radio stations and better technology in radios. The growth of hi-fi stereo systems and car radios in turn led to a boost in FM listening. FM surpassed AM radio in 1978. FM also doubled the number of stations, enabling specialized broadcasts for different genres of music. It also required consumers to purchase new equipment. The broadcast audio FM band (88 – 108 MHz in most countries) is around 100 times higher in frequency than the AM band and provides enough space for a bandwidth of 50 kHz. This bandwidth is sufficient to transmit both stereo channels with almost the full hearing range. Stereophonic receivers include a decoder.

The Post–World War II economic expansion in the US led to the growth of hi-fi products, increasingly seen as high tech hardware, with requisite jargon, and separated into premium-quality components with high-class aesthetics and marketing. The 1970s and 80s were the peak period for the hi-fi audio market. Demand increased for stereo products which fueled the growth of the industry as Japan caught up with the US. Standalone audio stereo FM tuners are still sought after for audiophile and TV/FM DX applications, especially those produced in the 1970s and early 1980s, when performance and manufacturing standards were perceived to be higher. The McIntosh MR78 (1972) is known as one of the first FM tuners precise enough to tune into a weaker station broadcast on the same frequency as another stronger signal.

As a result of circuit miniaturization, tuners began to be integrated with other products such as amplifiers and preamps, and other digital electronics, and marketed as AV or stereo receivers for home theater or hi-fi systems. The Japanese development of silicon transistor technology led to popular radio products in the 1980s such as the boombox and the Sony Walkman. Although integrated hi-fi stereo systems and AV or stereo receivers contain integrated tuners, separate components are sometimes preferred for higher quality. Separating amplification also often increases overall performance.

== Television ==
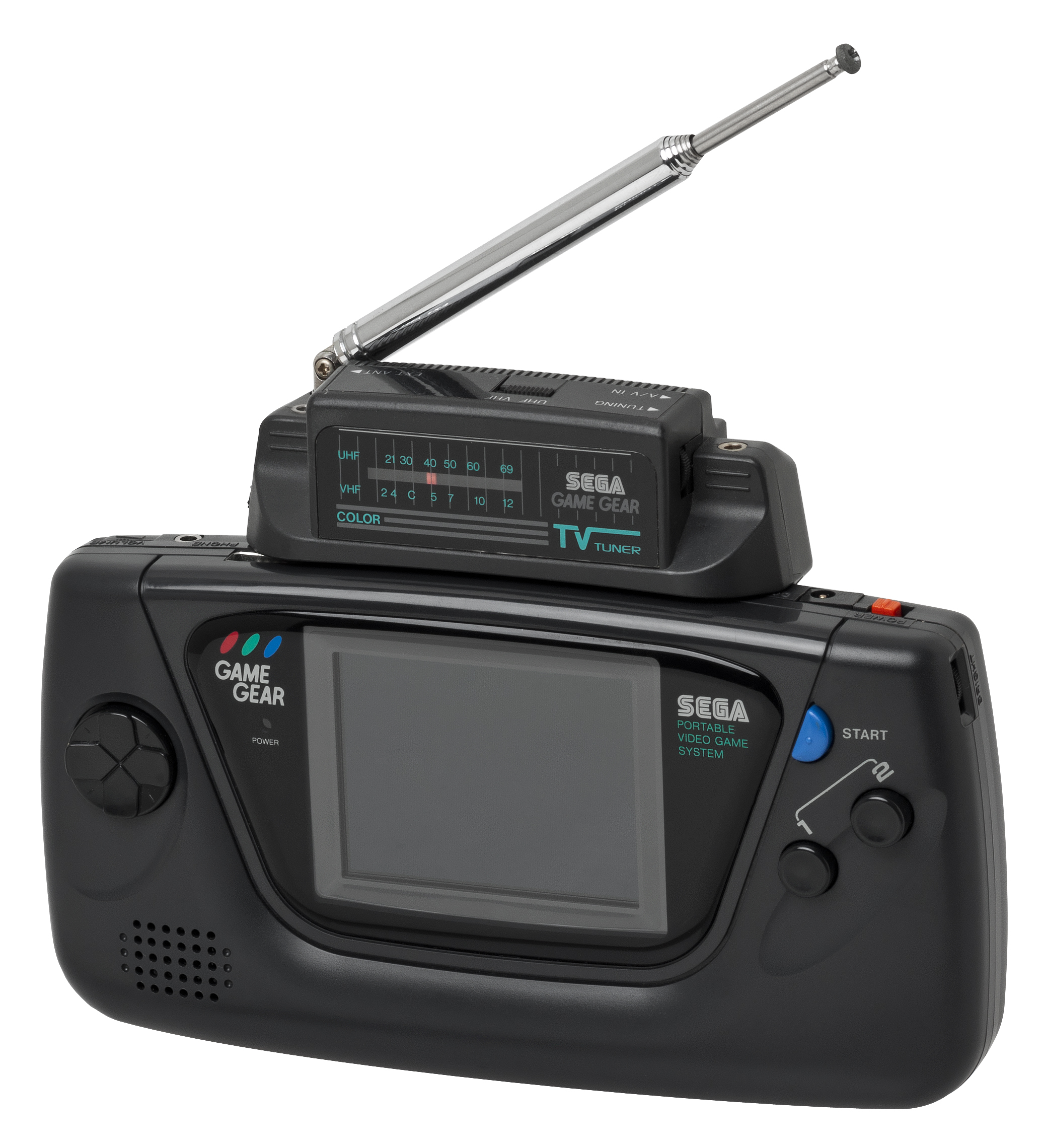
A TV tuner plugged into Sega Game Gear

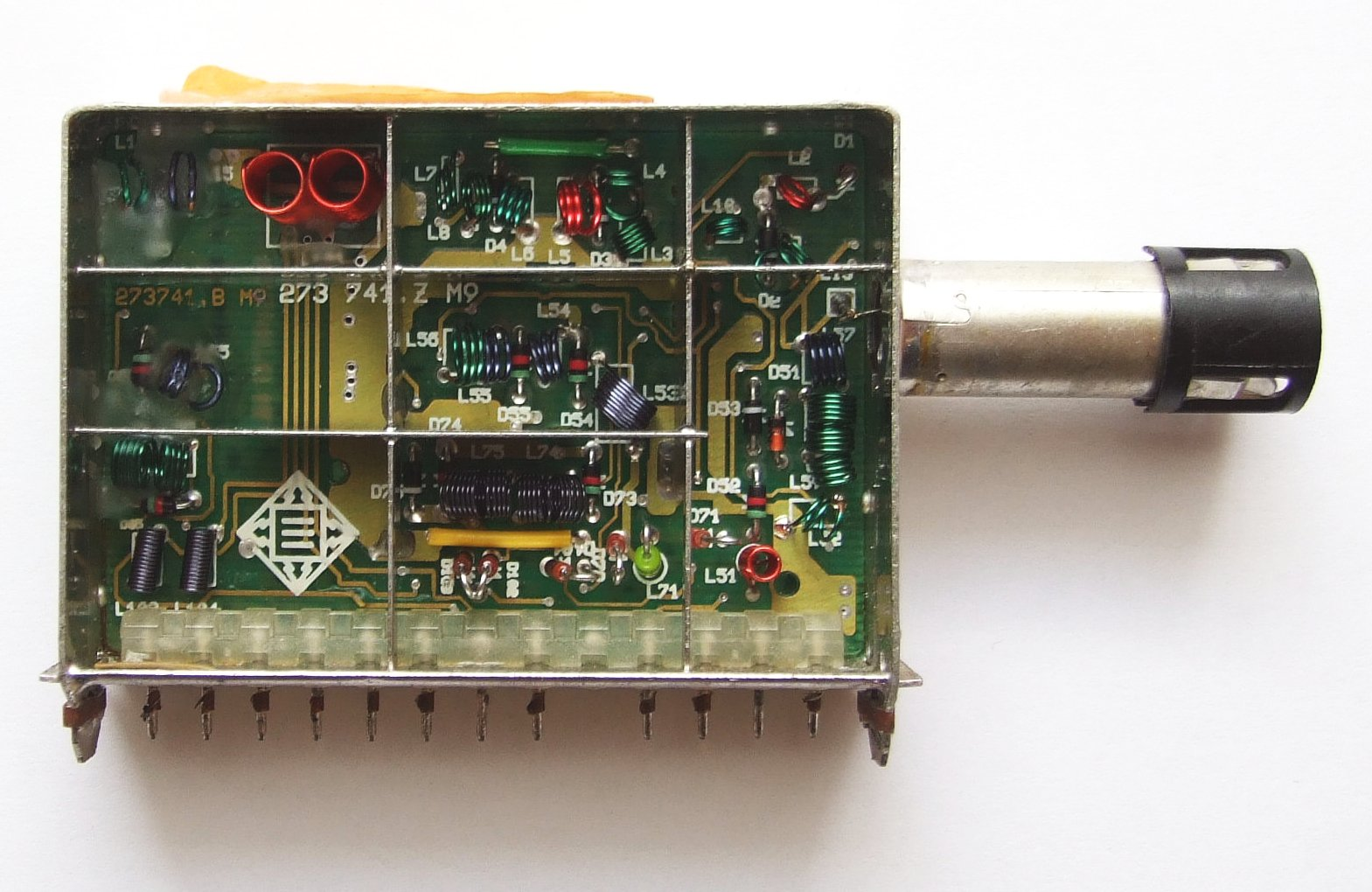
Opened VHF/UHF tuner of a television set. The antenna connector is on the right.

A television tuner or TV tuner, also called a TV receiver, is a component or subsystem that converts analog television or digital television transmissions into audio and video signals. A TV tuner must filter out unwanted signals and have a high signal-to-noise ratio. Television standards supported by TV tuners include PAL, NTSC, SECAM, ATSC, DVB-C, DVB-T, DVB-T2, ISDB, DTMB, T-DMB, and open cable. Cable boxes, converter boxes and other set top boxes contain tuners for digital TV services, and send their output composite, S-video, or component video format via SCART or other connectors. Many can be used with video monitors that do not have a TV tuner or direct video input. Tuners are often part of a VCR or digital video recorder (DVR, PVR).

Analog tuners can tune only analog signals. An ATSC tuner is a digital tuner that tunes digital signals only. Some digital tuners provide an analog bypass. An example frequency range is 48.25 MHz – 855.25 MHz (E2-E69), with a tuning frequency step size of 31.25, 50 or 62.5 kHz. Before the use of solid-state frequency synthesizers, covering the broad range of TV signal frequencies with a single tuned circuit and sufficient precision was uneconomic. Television channel frequencies were non-contiguous, with many non-broadcast services interleaved between VHF channels 6 and 7 in North America, for example. Instead, TV tuners of the era incorporated multiple sets of tuned circuits for the main signal path and local oscillator circuit. These "turret" tuners mechanically switched the receiving circuits by rotating a knob to select the desired channel. Channels were presented in fixed sequence, with no means to skip channels unused in a particular area. When UHF TV broadcasting was made available, often two completely separate tuner stages were used, with separate tuning knobs for selection of VHF band and UHF band channels. To allow for a small amount of drift or misalignment of the tuner with the actual transmitted frequency, tuners of that era included a "fine tuning" knob to allow minor adjustment for best reception. The combination of high frequencies, multiple electrical contacts, and frequent changing of channels in the tuner made it a high-maintenance part of the television receiver, as relatively small electrical or mechanical problems with the tuner would make the set unusable.

Computers may use an internal TV tuner card or USB connected external tuner to allow reception of over-the-air broadcasts or cable signals.

== See also ==
- Minimum detectable signal
- Radio scanner
