= Sound & Vision (magazine) =

American magazine

- Cover for the last issue (October–November 2024)
- Editor: Mark Henninger
- Categories: Entertainment magazine
- Frequency: Six issues/year
- Publisher: Keith Pray
- Total circulation: 132,443 (December 2012)
- Founded: 1958
- Final issue: October 2024
- Company: AV Tech Media
- Country: United States
- Based in: New York City
- Language: English
- Website: soundandvision.com
- ISSN: 1537-5838

Sound & Vision was an American magazine, purchased by AVTech Media Ltd. (UK) in March 2018, covering home theater, audio, video and multimedia consumer products. Before 2000, it had been published for most of its history as Stereo Review. The magazine is headquartered in New York City. October/November 2024 was the last printed issue, with the brand continuing as a website.

== History and profile ==
Stereo Review was an American magazine first published in 1958 by Ziff-Davis with the title HiFi and Music Review. During the initial phase, the magazine was headquartered in Chicago, Illinois. It was one of a handful of magazines then available for the individual interested in high fidelity. Throughout its life, it published a blend of record and equipment reviews, articles on music and musicians, and articles on technical issues and advice. The name changed to HiFi Review in 1959. It became HiFi/Stereo Review in February 1960 to reflect the growing use of stereophonic technology in recordings and broadcasts. In 1968, it became, simply, Stereo Review, reflecting the broad shift to stereophonic reproduction and simplifying the title. In the late 1980s, the magazine was acquired by CBS Magazines (now Hachette Filipacchi), and in 1989, it absorbed High Fidelity magazine. During the 1990s, consumer trends began to branch out into home theater matters and the magazine contents followed in kind. In 1999, Stereo Review merged with Video, a magazine Hachette Filipacchi had acquired from Reese Communications, to become Stereo Review's Sound & Vision before settling on its current name in 2000, reflecting how dominant home theater had become in consumer purchases.

In June 2009 Hachette Filipacchi sold the publication to Bonnier Corporation, the U.S. division of the Swedish Bonnier Group, along with four other magazines: Popular Photography, Boating, Flying and American Photo. In 2013, Bonnier sold it to Source Interlink, who merged it with its previously owned consumer electronics magazine Home Theater. In March 2018, Sound & Vision was purchased, along with related magazines and websites, by AVTech Media Ltd.

One of the key features of the magazine was the permanence of its staff. Some staffers stayed for decades. One of them, Louise Boundas, rose from the ranks to become the magazine's editor from the late 1980s into the 1990s. Another, Julian Hirsch, was known for his technical reviews of equipment; he was involved with the magazine from 1961 until his retirement in 1998, nearly 40 years.

The October/November 2024 issue was the last print issue, with the Web site continuing.

A Canadian magazine with the same title and focus ceased publication about a year before Stereo Review took the name.

== See also ==
- Audio (magazine)
- Sister publications from AVTech Media:
  - Hi-Fi News & Record Review
  - Stereophile
