= Julian Hirsch =

American electrical engineer (1922–2003)

Julian David Hirsch (May 15, 1922 - November 24, 2003) was an electrical engineer and audio critic.

== Life and early career ==
Hirsch discovered amateur radio at the age of 14 and was soon building his own equipment. He received a Bachelor's degree in Electrical Engineering from The Cooper Union in 1943 and served in the Army Signal Corps during World War II. In 1954, Hirsch and several other engineers started testing commercial audio components to see how well they met their performance claims, and they began a subscription-based newsletter, the Audio League Report, where they published the results.

== Hirsch-Houck Laboratories ==
In 1957, Hirsch and Gladden Houck, who also worked on the Audio League Report, formed Hirsch-Houck Laboratories, where they continued testing audio equipment such as turntables, receivers, and speakers, and sold the data to various publications. In 1960, Ziff-Davis Publishing bought out Gladden Houck and Hirsch began providing test data exclusively for its publications, although the lab continued to be called Hirsch-Houck Laboratories. Hirsch first tested gear for Popular Electronics, then, in October 1961, for Hi-Fi/Stereo Review, which was later renamed Stereo Review. He also began writing the monthly column "Technical Talk." Hirsch estimated that he wrote about 4,000 laboratory test reports for various publications, 2,400 of those at Stereo Review, by the time he retired in 1998. He remained an editor-at-large for Stereo Review, which merged with Video magazine, and in 2000 was renamed Sound & Vision.

== Legacy ==
Hirsch helped draft the Institute of High Fidelity standards that made it easier for consumers to compare audio equipment. Bob Ankosko, an editor-in-chief at Sound & Vision, said "Julian Hirsch was one of the most influential writers ever in consumer electronics."

Hachette Filipacchi Media U.S., publisher of Sound & Vision, established the Julian Hirsch Scholarship Fund at his alma mater, the School of Engineering of The Cooper Union.
