= ILo Technologies =

Launched in 2004, iLo technologies is a Wal-Mart consumer electronics house brand. Wal-Mart sells many low cost, entry-level consumer electronics products under the iLo name in stores and on Walmart.com. As with many house brands, no single company manufactures all iLo products.

CyberHome USA, an electronics manufacturer of iLo products, currently has their intellectual property, trademarks and domain names for sale, including www.iloservice.com, after their California warehouse was raided by law enforcement in June 2006. A task force of local, state and federal agencies—led by the FBI—seized over 20,000 CyberHome-branded DVD players which Philips claimed used their patents without a license. The estimated retail value of the seized players is more than US$2 million.
