= Table radio =

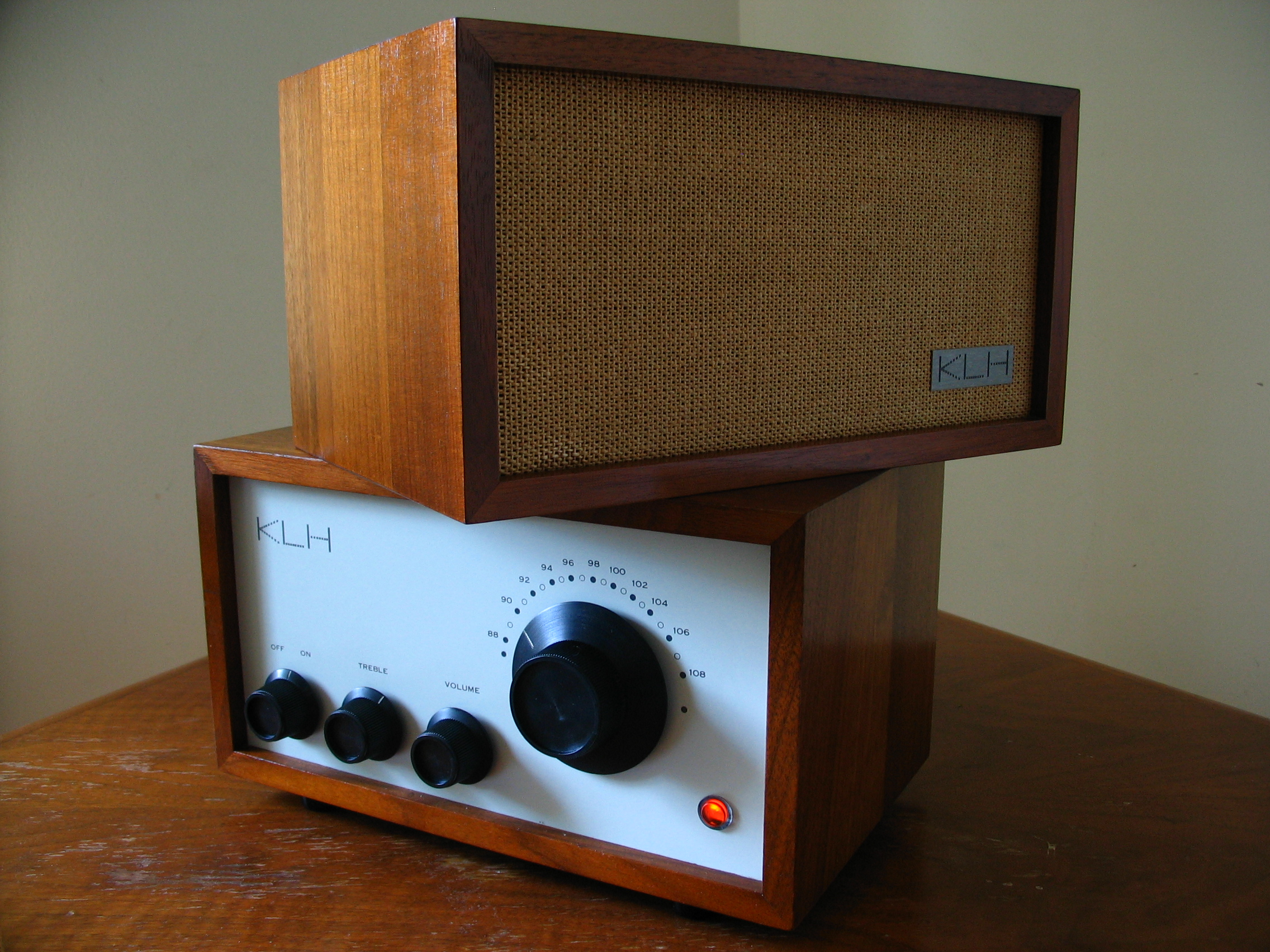
The KLH Model Eight FM table radio, circa 1960

A table radio is a small, self-contained radio receiver used as an entertainment device. Most such receivers are limited to radio functions, though some have compact disc or audio cassette players and clock radio functions built in; some models also include shortwave or satellite radio functionality.

Though generally compact in design, table radios are not necessarily intended to be portable in the manner of a boom box. Many can run on battery power, however, making them useful as emergency radios. Some with CD functionality traditionally have top loading CD players but more recently can have front loading CD players.

== History ==
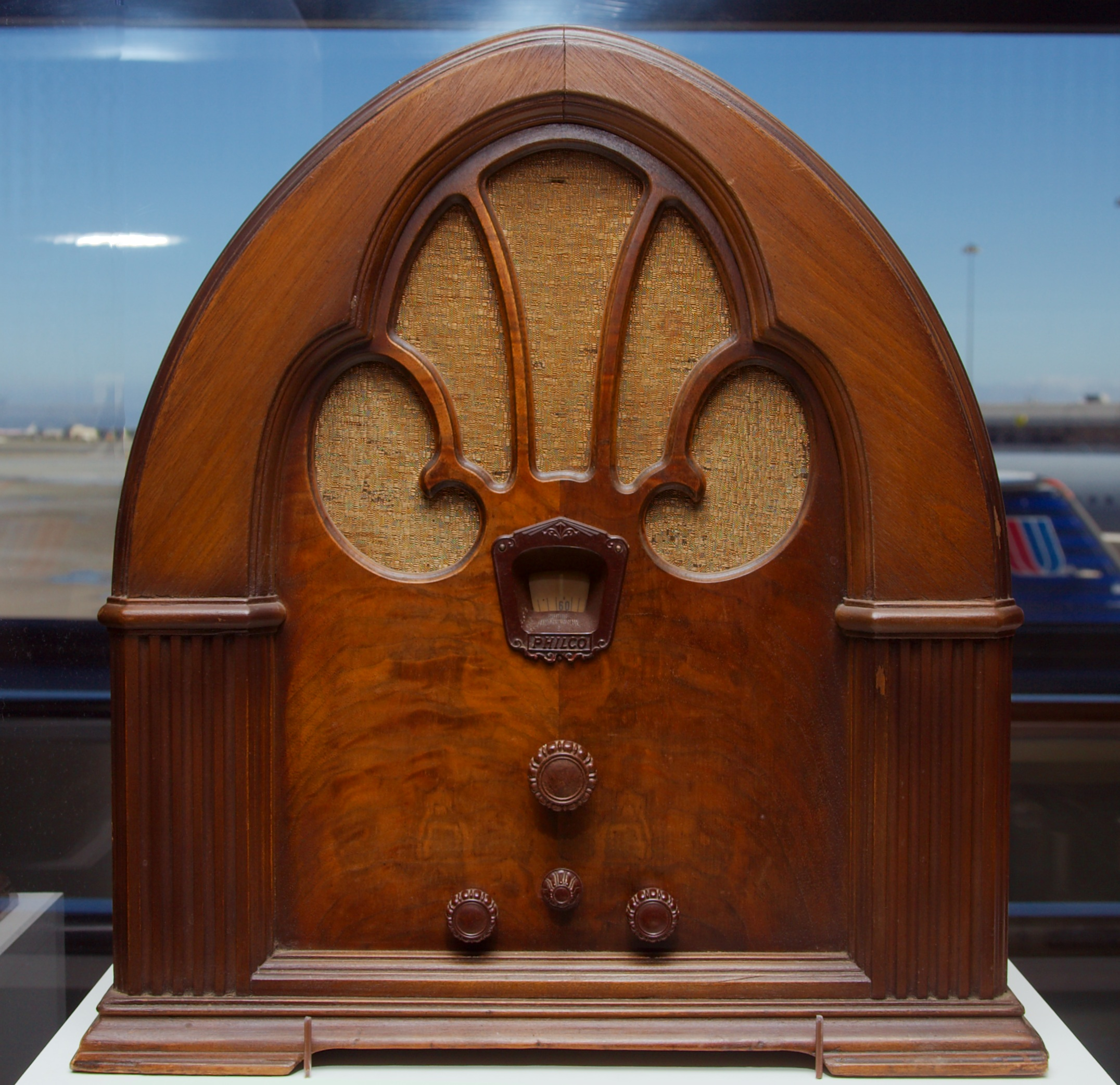
A Philco 90 "cathedral" style radio, circa 1931

Although some households owned one or more sophisticated table radios or console models with shortwave and radio-phonograph combinations as early as the 1920s, table radios offered in various cabinet materials and designs at an assortment of prices from $10 to over $100 proliferated in the 1930s. They were characterized by relatively high fidelity sound, as well as large cabinets typically made of wood and metal, with some made from various colors of bakelite and catalin plastic resins. During those years, listening to the radio was considered a family activity. Some of the more well known examples from this period are Philco cathedral models 70 and 90.

During the 1940s, table model radios were considered the backbone of the radio manufacturing industry. Volume increased after World War II, and accounted for almost two thirds of all sets produced in the US in 1946.

More compact table radios with both vacuum tube and transistor technology became available in the 1950s, and smaller table radios such as clock radios became dominant during this period. The use of plastic cabinets also became widespread. Lower performance standards resulted in declining sound quality, especially in early all-transistor sets. The popularity of television led to the table radio's decline as the primary means to receive news and entertainment in a communal or family setting, and their increasing use in individual or personal settings.

High performance table radios such as the KLH Model Eight were introduced in the 1960s, and followed in the late 1990s and early 2000s by table radios that offered AM/FM stereo reception and CD player functions, such as the Kloss Model 88 and Bose Wave radio.

== See also ==
- Shelf stereo
- Boombox
