= Home audio =

Audio electronics for home entertainment

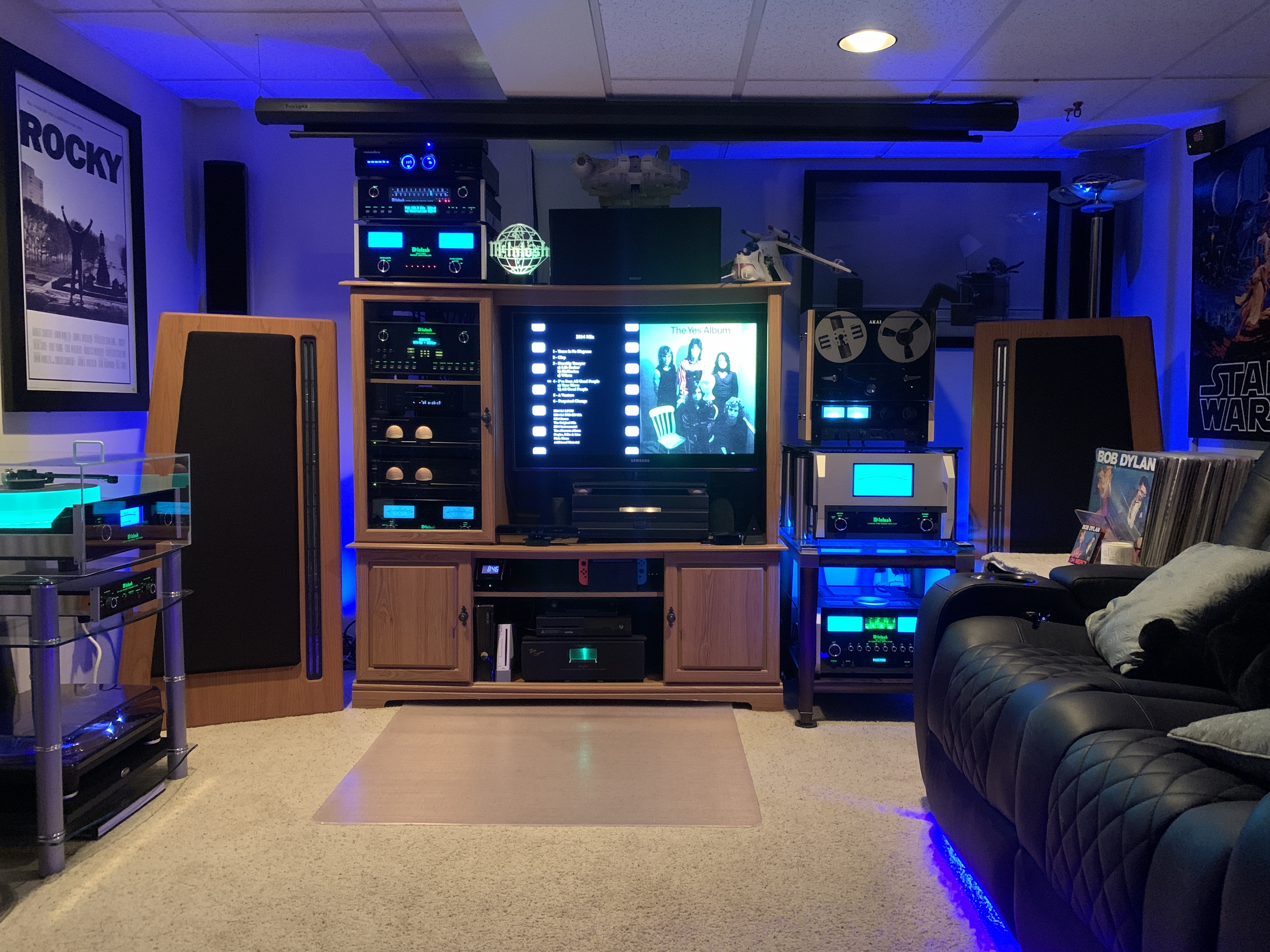
Advanced home audio system with various audio and video components

Home audio refers to audio consumer electronics designed for home entertainment, such as integrated systems like shelf stereos, as well as individual components like loudspeakers and surround sound receivers.

The evolution of home audio began with Edison's phonograph, transitioning from monaural to stereophonic sound in the 1950s and 60s when the term hi-fi emerged, highlighting sound accuracy and minimal distortion. Audio equipment evolved from large wooden cabinets to compact units. The 1970s introduced enhancements like quadraphonic sound and technologies like Dolby Pro Logic. This era also saw the rise of component-based stereo systems, and cassette decks also became a staple. Integrated systems, termed music centers, gained popularity in the 1980s. Table systems and compact radio receivers emerged as entertainment devices, with some offering features like cassette players and CD functionality. Audiophile systems prioritize high-quality music formats and specialized equipment like premium turntables, digital-to-analog converters, and other high-end devices, with some enthusiasts preferring the unique sound characteristics of vinyl records and vacuum tubes. Modern systems often emphasize home cinema applications to enhance the audio experience beyond standard TV speakers.

== History ==
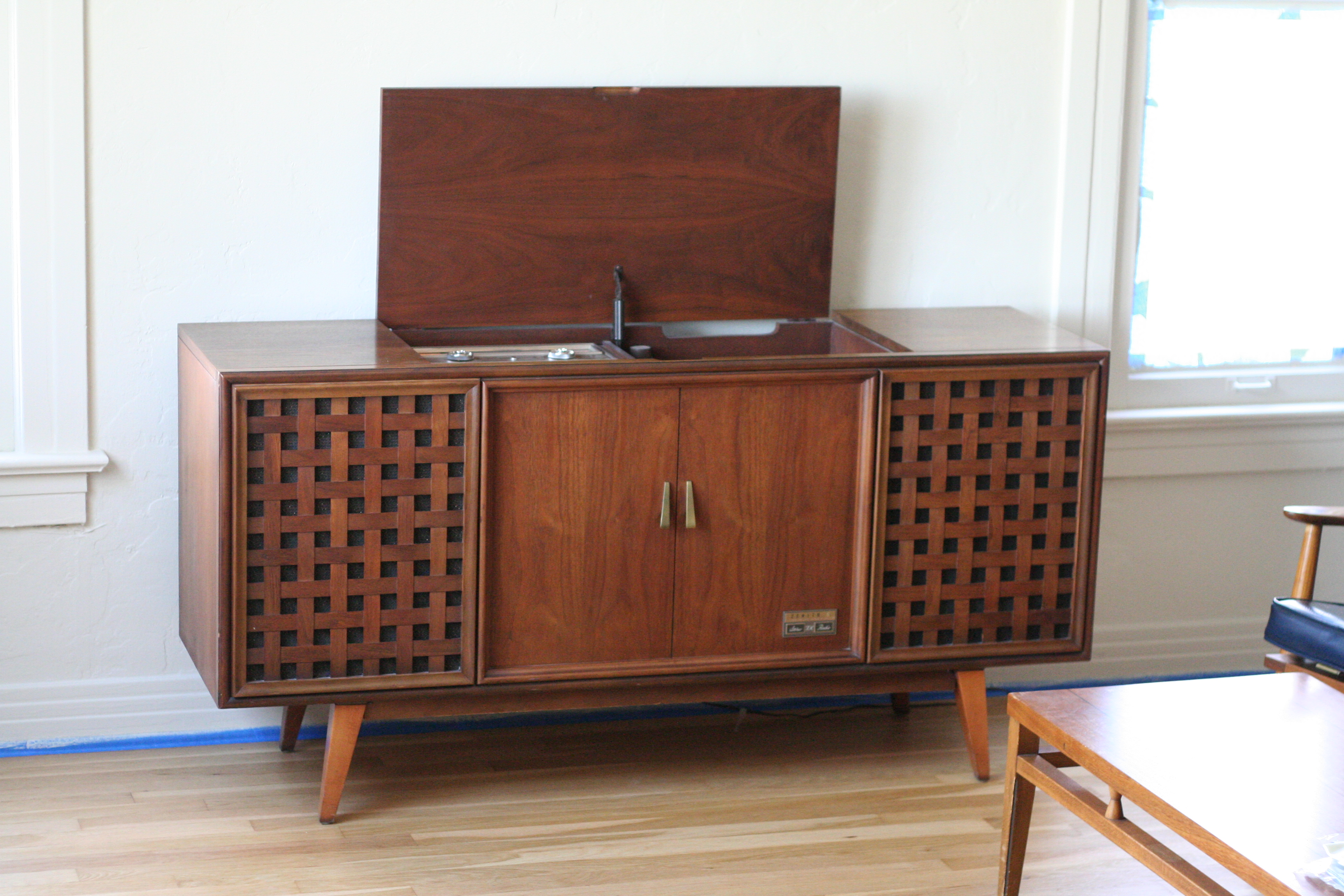
Zenith radiogram console stereo, c. 1960

Home audio dates back before electricity, to Edison's phonograph, a monaural, low fidelity sound reproduction format. Early electrical phonographs as well as many other audio formats started out as monaural formats. In addition to playing records on phonographs, consumers in the 1930s and 1940s listened to radio programs on separate radio receivers, often large wooden consoles.

Home audio devices containing both a record player and a Wireless radio receiver were usually called radiograms or stereograms in British English, and consoles in American English. Very often these were designed as items of household furniture, with a large wooden cabinet on legs. These units were monaural and featured a single integrated loudspeaker in the main body of the cabinet.

The 1950s and 60s marked the transition from mono to stereophonic sound. Before the widespread adoption of stereo technology, the home audio landscape was dominated by mono systems. The term hi-fi, an abbreviation for high fidelity, was coined during this era to describe audio systems that aimed to reproduce sound with high accuracy and minimal distortion. The vinyl LP became popular during the 1950s, and the availability of affordable components such as turntables, speakers and amplifiers enhanced the sonic realism of music playback in homes. This period was characterized by home audio enthusiasts' emphasis on achieving the highest quality sound reproduction possible, and the term hi-fi became popular shorthand for this pursuit.

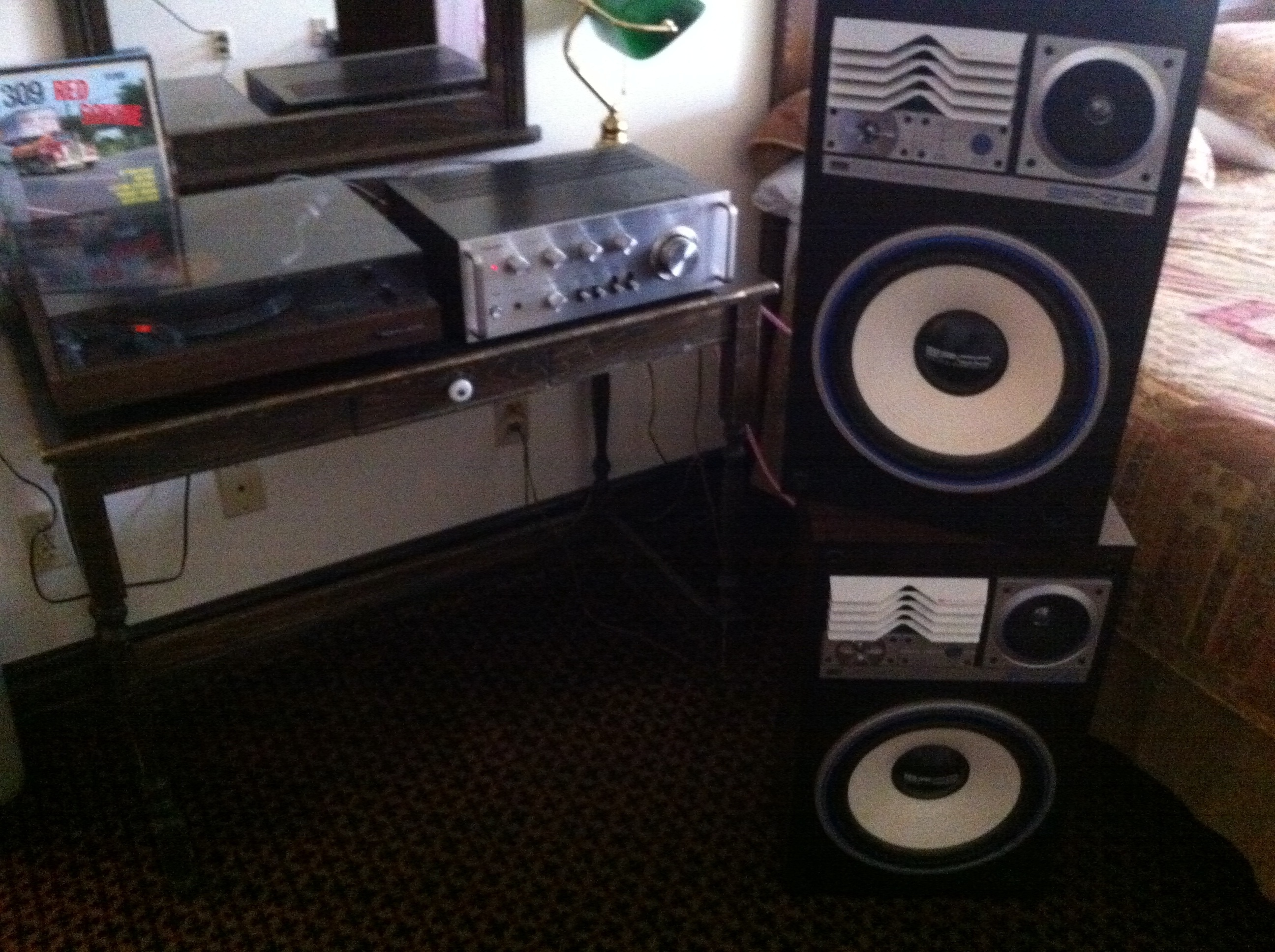
Home audio component system with separate components

By the early 1960s, stereo had become the new standard, offering listeners an immersive experience with left and right channels, as well as a phantom "center" channel. This two-channel system introduced concepts like imaging, left-right panning, three-dimensionality, and depth, creating a lifelike soundstage that mono systems couldn't replicate. The transition from low-powered, high-distortion vacuum tubes to early solid-state transistors and later, to more reliable silicon transistors, marked significant milestones in the evolution of audio technology during this time.

The necessity of having suitable separation of the speakers meant that the single cabinet designs evolved into three-box designs, and the main box could become much smaller. By the beginning of the 1970s, systems were starting to be made of plastic and other materials rather than wood.

With the evolution of technology and the emergence of diverse home audio formats, younger audiences shifted from integrated systems and opted for expansive modular units or "component systems" comprising amplifiers, speakers, radios, turntables, and devices for tapes and later CDs. While audiophiles had been handpicking individual components to craft premium audio setups since the 1950s, it was during the 1970s and 1980s that these component-based stereo systems became a household staple. During this era, aesthetically appealing but sometimes average-sounding pre-assembled systems were commonly sold.

The 1970s saw the inclusion of a deck for playing cassette tapes in addition to the turntable and receiver components. The cassette deck was either a top-loading unit beside the turntable or a front-loading unit mounted on a deeper front panel.

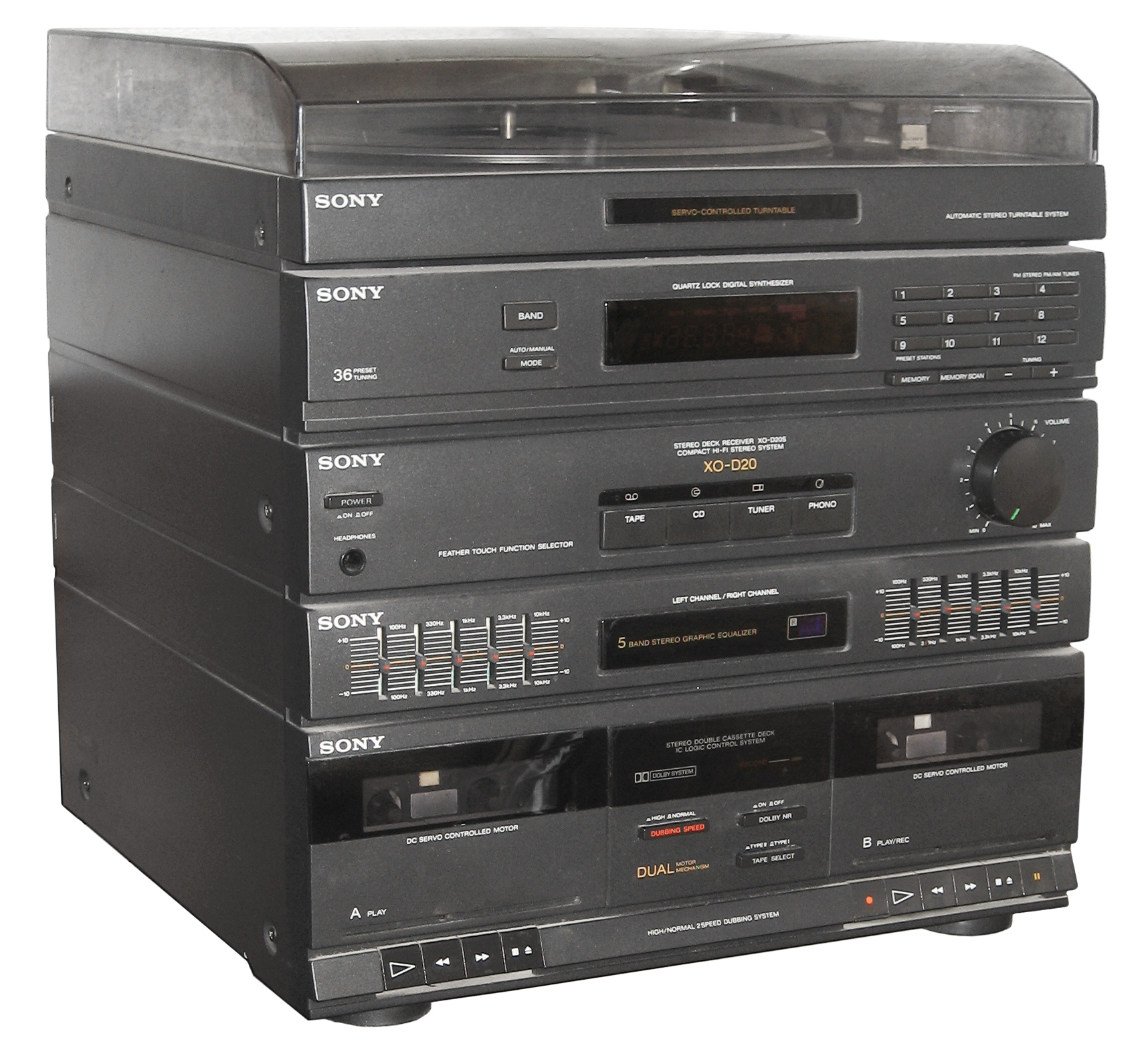
"Midi" system, c. 1980s

Quadraphonic sound was released in 1970 and never gained much popularity. It was a four-channel reproduction system, which is considered to be the origin of surround sound. It was recorded on phonograph, tape, and a few CDs, and required a quadraphonic player for playback.

Surround sound formats became available to consumers in the late 80s. Dolby Pro Logic is one of the oldest processors, creating four channels, and Dolby Pro Logic IIx is one of the newest, creating seven or eight discrete channels. Competing technologies have complicated the purchasing decisions of consumers.

The term music centre came into common use when all-in-one integrated systems, also known as shelf stereos or mini component systems, became popular. "Midi"-style systems (mimicking the appearance of a stacked component-based system) were popular during the 1980s. These typically included a record deck, tuner, dual cassette deck, amplifier and separate speakers. Some later midi systems also included a CD player in the main unit in addition to the turntable.

The compact disc first appeared in the early 1980s, and because they were small, they were increasingly integrated into cheap all-in-one systems. As CD rapidly overtook vinyl in the early 1990s, the addition of a bulky record player (common in midi-style systems) was discontinued. Resulting bookshelf-sized "mini" systems became more compact, which helped popularize the integrated hi-fi system.

Digital Audio Tape (DAT) emerged in the mid-1980s and 1990s, envisioned as the next step after cassettes, just as CDs were seen as the successors to vinyl records. While DAT gained some traction in countries such as Japan and was used as a computer storage format, it didn't achieve widespread acceptance, mainly due to the dominance of CDs. MiniDisc was created for sound aficionados seeking a compact design with the ability to record, similar to cassettes, but its success was limited due to the appearance of writable CD technology.

Streaming music stereo, smart speakers, and wireless speakers emerged in the 1990s and 2000s with the popularity of streaming platforms such as Spotify and YouTube surpassing MP3-centric platforms. These systems have shifted the traditional central stereo setup to multiple individual speaker units distributed across homes, all manageable through computer and mobile applications.

=== Magazines ===
Beginning approximately in the 1950s, a number of magazines devoted to hi-fi enthusiasts and aficionados seeking to assemble an ideal home audio system arose, such as High Fidelity, Audio, Gramophone, The Absolute Sound, Stereophile, and The Boston Audio Society Speaker. Among these, Stereo Review was notable for its lab test reports, listening evaluations, and new equipment reviews by Julian Hirsch. Buying guides such as What Hi-Fi? focus on news and reviews of stereo speakers, TVs, amplifiers, headphones, soundbars, projectors, tablets and turntables.

== Components ==
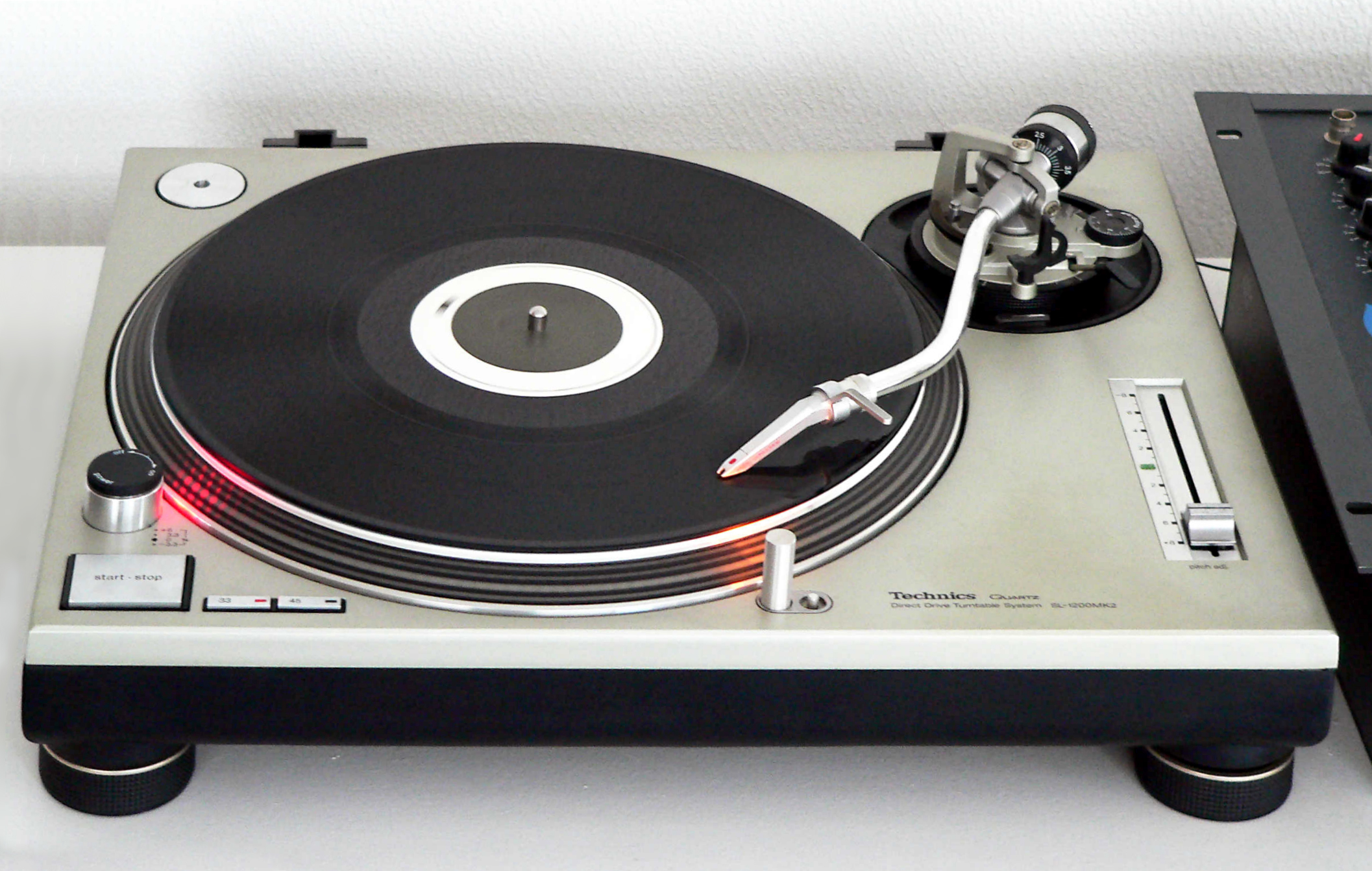
Direct-drive turntable

A modern home audio system can vary in complexity, but the following are common components found in many setups.

=== Source ===
- AV receiver: Receives audio (and video) from a number of sources.
- CD Player: For playing CDs.
- Turntable: For playing vinyl records.
- Digital audio player: Devices like iPods or other MP3 players.
- Streaming device: Such as Amazon Echo, Google Chromecast Audio, or dedicated network streamers.
- Tuner: For AM/FM radio reception.
- Cassette deck: Used for playing cassettes.
- Tape deck: Used for playing open reels of audio tape.
- DAC (Digital-to-Analog Converter): Converts digital audio signals to analog for playback.

=== Amplification ===
- Stereo receiver: Combines a preamplifier, amplifier, and often a tuner into one unit. Receivers often have built-in support for streaming services and multi-room audio.
- AV receiver: Also known as a home theater receiver, connects to a TV and decodes multiple audio channels to power a multi-speaker surround sound system.
- Preamplifier: It takes the weak audio signal from the source component and sends a stronger signal to the amplifier. Controls and selects audio sources, adjusts volume, and may offer tone adjustments.
- Amplifier: Boosts the audio signal from the preamplifier and sends it to the speakers.
- Phono stage: Takes the phono signal from a turntable and amplifies it into a line signal.

=== Electroacoustic transducers ===
- Speakers: Most high-fidelity speaker systems include tweeters capable of reproducing the highest audio frequencies, mid-range drivers for middle frequencies, and woofers for low frequencies.
- Headphones: Headphones let a single user listen to an audio source privately.

== Mini component systems ==
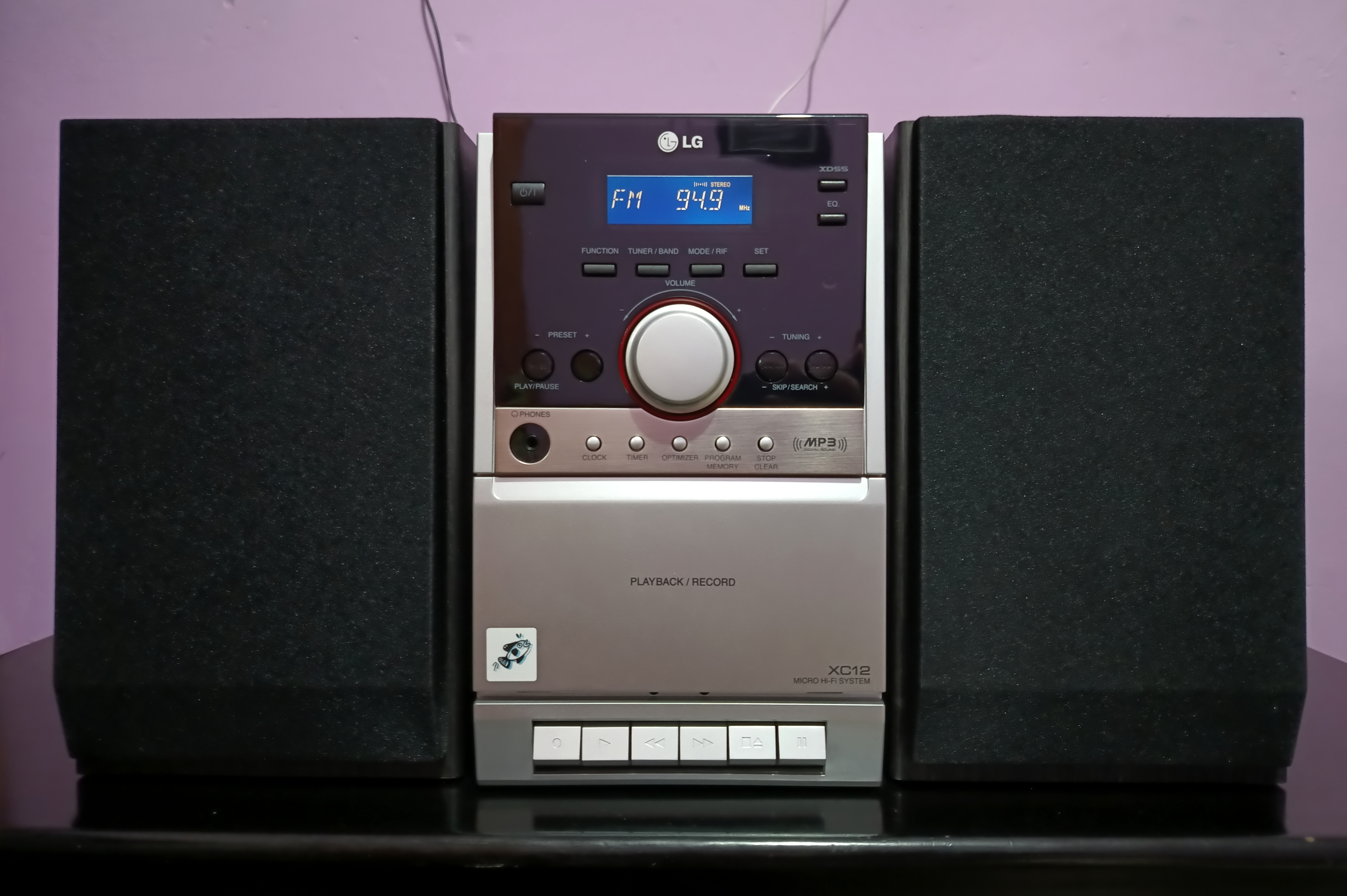
LG XC12-D1 Mini HiFi, c. 2008

The shelf stereo, also known as a mini component system or simply mini system, is a compact stereo system that is generally small enough to fit on an average shelf and sold with all necessary components packaged together. They may accept various media or connect to other systems. The systems are usually both small enough to fit on an average shelf (hence their name) and sold with all of their necessary components packaged together, if not outright integrated into the same physical enclosure.

Shelf stereos may accept different types of media. Many stereos come with or have the ability to connect to other systems. These can feature media inputs and external connections for radios, cassettes, CDs, MP3 players, Bluetooth devices, USB flash memory drives, Satellite radios and turntables.

== Table systems ==
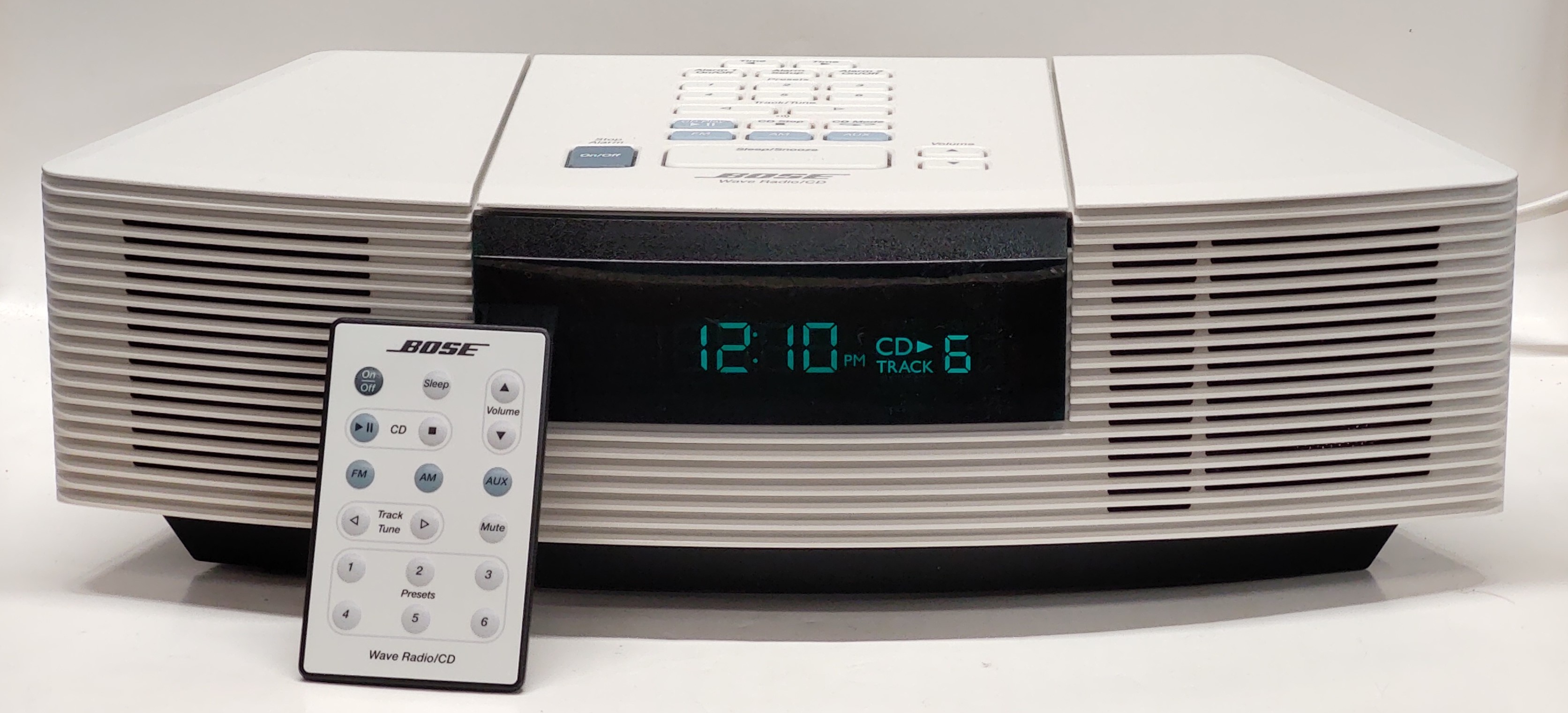
Bose Wave Radio/CD

A table radio is a small, self-contained radio receiver used as an entertainment device. Most such receivers are limited to radio functions, though some have compact disc or audio cassette players and clock radio functions built in; some models also include shortwave or satellite radio functionality. High-performance table radios such as the KLH Model Eight were introduced in the 1960s, and followed in the late 1990s and early 2000s by table radios that offered AM/FM stereo reception and CD player functions, such as the Kloss Model 88 and Bose Wave radio.

== Audiophile systems ==
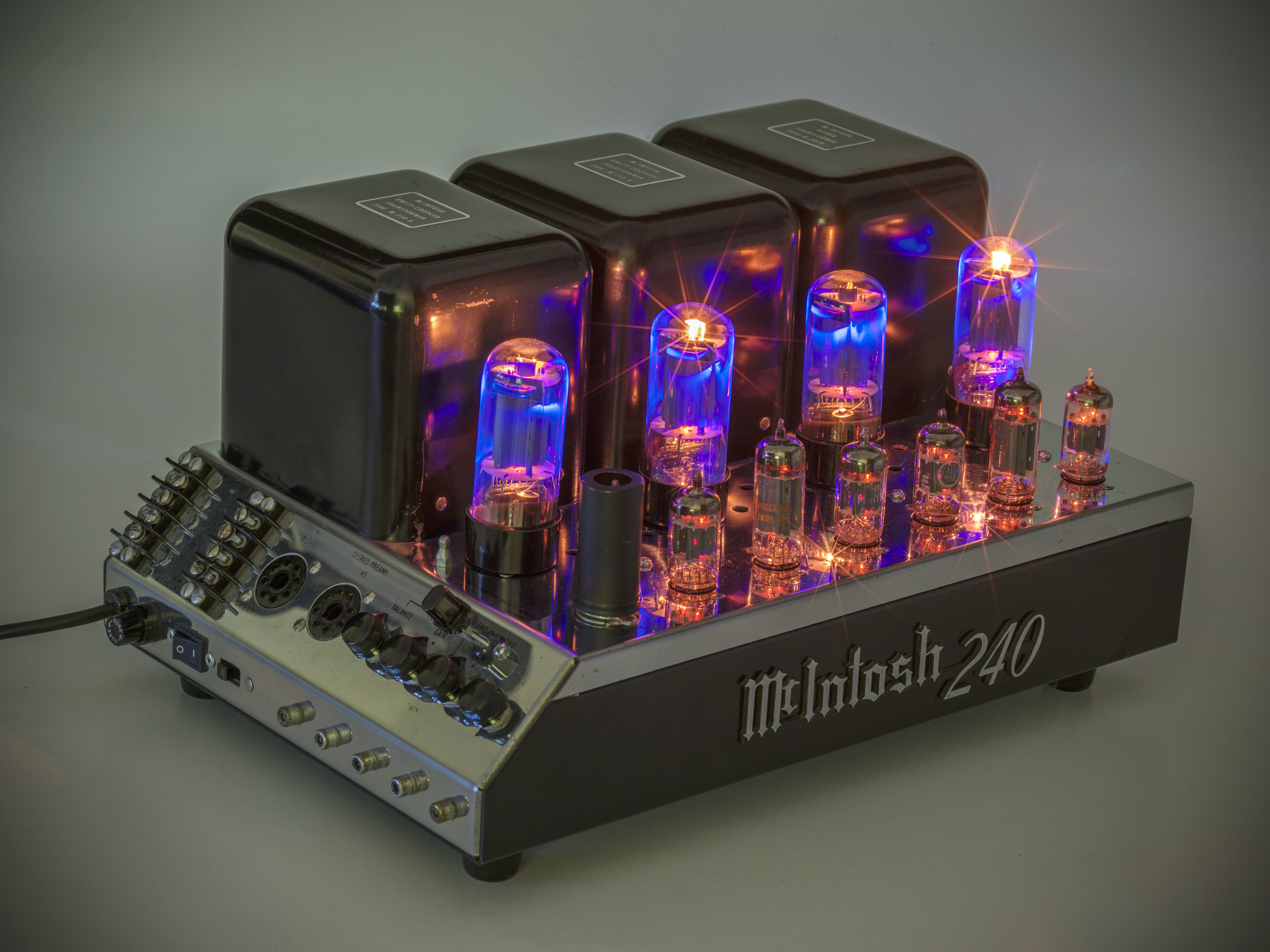
High-end McIntosh vacuum tube stereo amplifier

Audiophiles often prioritize high-quality music formats and specialized equipment over more convenient but lower-quality options, such as MP3s or low-cost headphones. The term "high-end audio" is used to describe the playback equipment favored by audiophiles, which can be purchased from specialized retailers. This equipment can include turntables, digital-to-analog converters, equalization devices, amplifiers, loudspeakers, and techniques such as the optimization of room acoustics. Audiophiles also play music from diverse sources, including vinyl records, CDs, and lossless compressed digital audio files. Audiophiles debate the merits of analog vs. digital sound, and despite the digital age, vinyl records and vacuum tubes remain popular among audiophiles due to their unique sound characteristics. While many audiophile techniques are grounded in objective criteria, the perceived sound quality is subjective, leading to some techniques being based on pseudoscientific principles.

== Home cinema systems ==
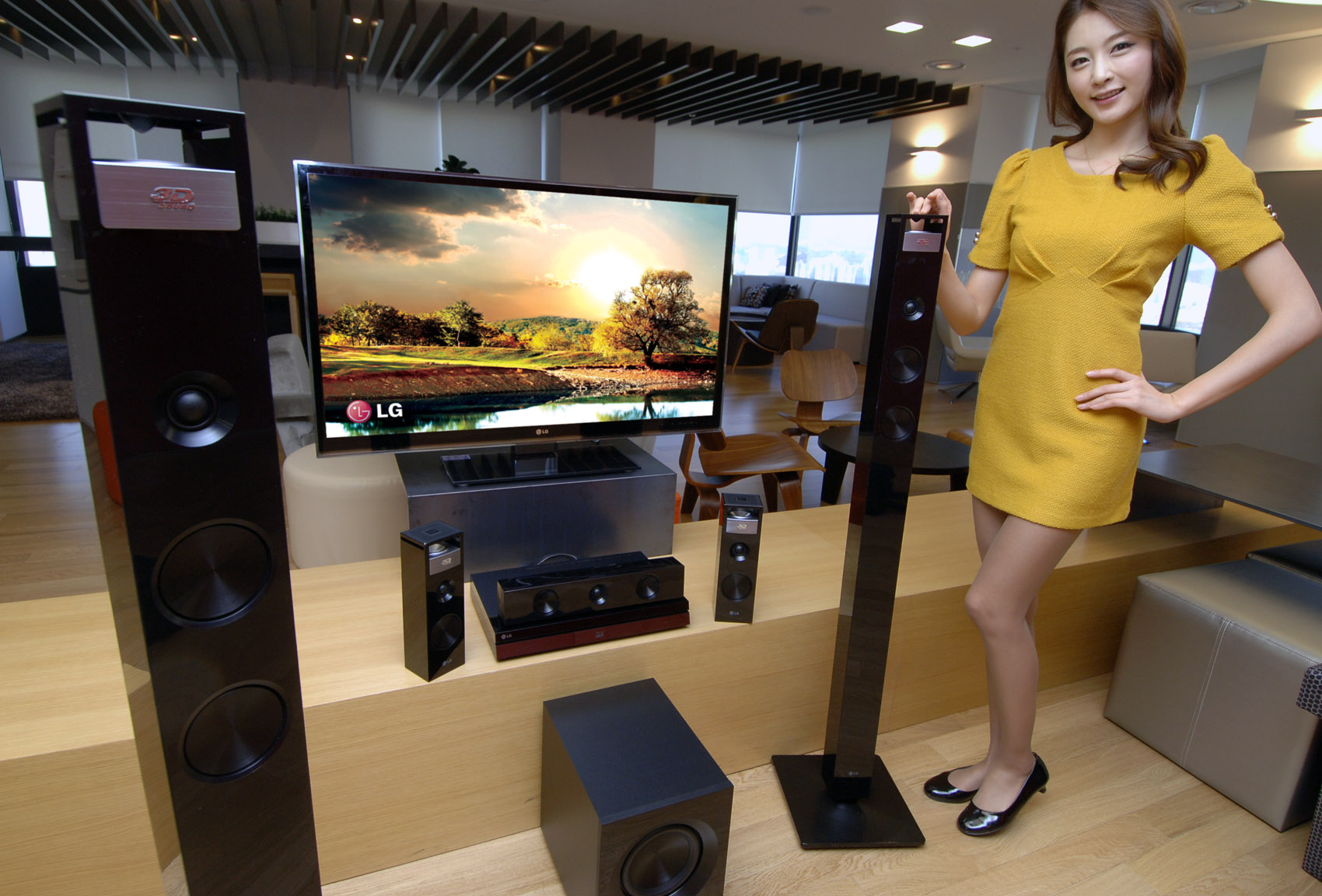
Home cinema package at a consumer electronics retailer

Modern home cinema systems typically augment the audio output from a DVD player or Blu-ray player with a multi-channel power amplifier and anywhere from two speakers and a stereo power amp (for stereo sound) to a 5.1 channel amplifier and five or more surround sound speaker cabinets (with a surround sound system). Whether home cinema enthusiasts have a stereo set-up or a 5.1-channel surround system, they typically use at least one low-frequency subwoofer speaker cabinet to amplify low-frequency effects from movie soundtracks and reproduce the deep pitches from the musical soundtrack.

== See also ==
- Audio player (disambiguation)
