= Boombox =

Portable music player with tape recorders and radio with a carrying handle

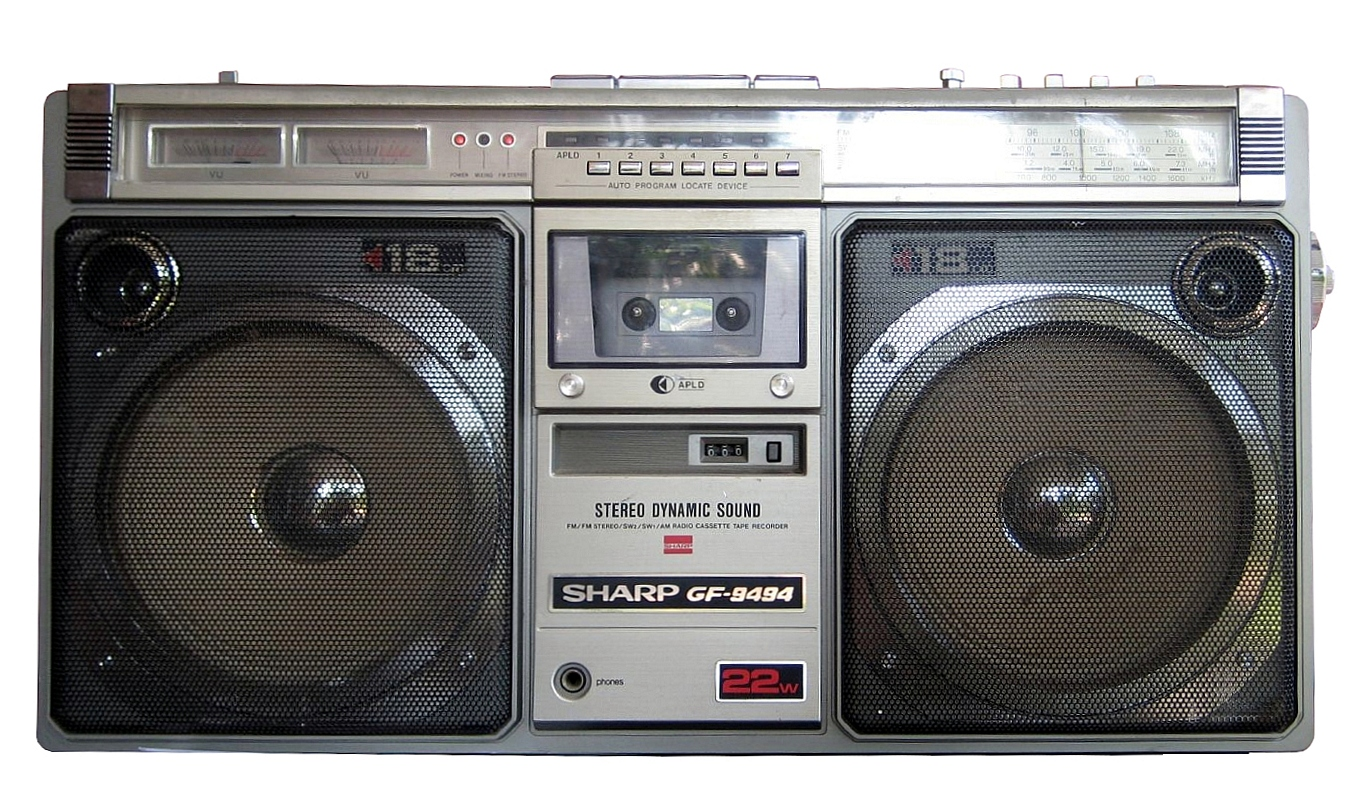
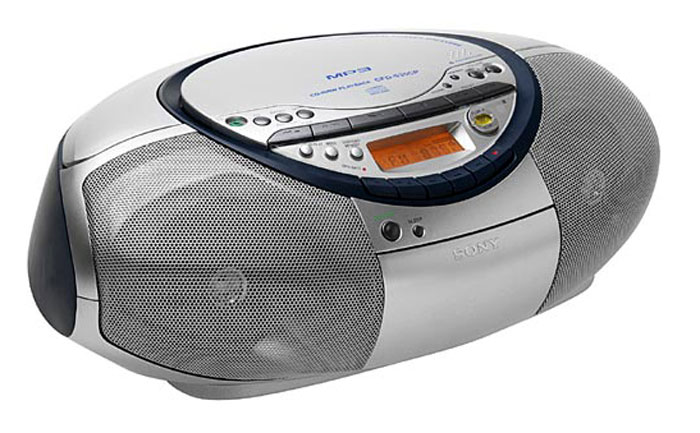
Top: Sharp Corporation's GF-9494, "Ghetto Blaster", released in 1980.
Bottom: Sony CD and cassette CFD-S35CP boombox released in 2005 (based on the instruction manual).

A boombox is a transistorized portable music player featuring one or two cassette tape players/recorders and AM/FM radio, generally with a carrying handle. Beginning in the mid-1990s, a CD player was often included. Sound is delivered through an amplifier and two or more integrated loudspeakers. The device is typically capable of receiving radio stations and playing recorded music on cassette tapes or compact discs. Many models are also capable of recording onto cassette. In the 1990s, some boomboxes were available with MiniDisc recorders and players. Designed for portability, boomboxes can be powered by batteries as well as by line current.

The boombox was introduced to the American market during the late 1970s. The desire for louder and heavier bass led to bigger and heavier boxes; by the 1980s, some boomboxes had reached the size of a suitcase. Some larger boomboxes even contained vertically mounted record turntables. Most boomboxes were battery-operated, leading to extremely heavy, bulky boxes.

The boombox quickly became associated with urban society in the United States, particularly African American and Latino youth. The wide use of boomboxes in urban communities led to the boombox being called a "ghetto blaster". Some cities petitioned for the banning of boomboxes from public places, and over time, they became less acceptable on city streets. The boombox became closely linked to American hip-hop culture and was instrumental in the rise of hip-hop.

== History ==
The first boombox was developed by the inventor of the audio compact cassette, Philips of the Netherlands. Their first 'Radiorecorder' was released in 1966. The Philips innovation was the first time that radio broadcasts could be recorded onto cassette tapes without the cables or microphones that previous stand-alone cassette tape recorders required. Recordings of radio were still subject to interferences from automobiles and other vehicles nearby with the same frequency, limiting their overall quality. Although the sound quality of early cassette tape recordings was poor, improvements in technology and the introduction of stereo recording, chromium tapes, and Dolby noise reduction made hifi quality devices possible. Several European electronics brands, such as Grundig, also introduced similar devices.

In East Europe, they also gained some popularity, and were also manufactured in eastern countries. Most well known were in the Soviet Union and East Germany, but also in Poland, Hungary and Czechoslovakia, Romania, both under license or own designs. Usually they were less sophisticated, but some of them could compete at some point with average western boomboxes.

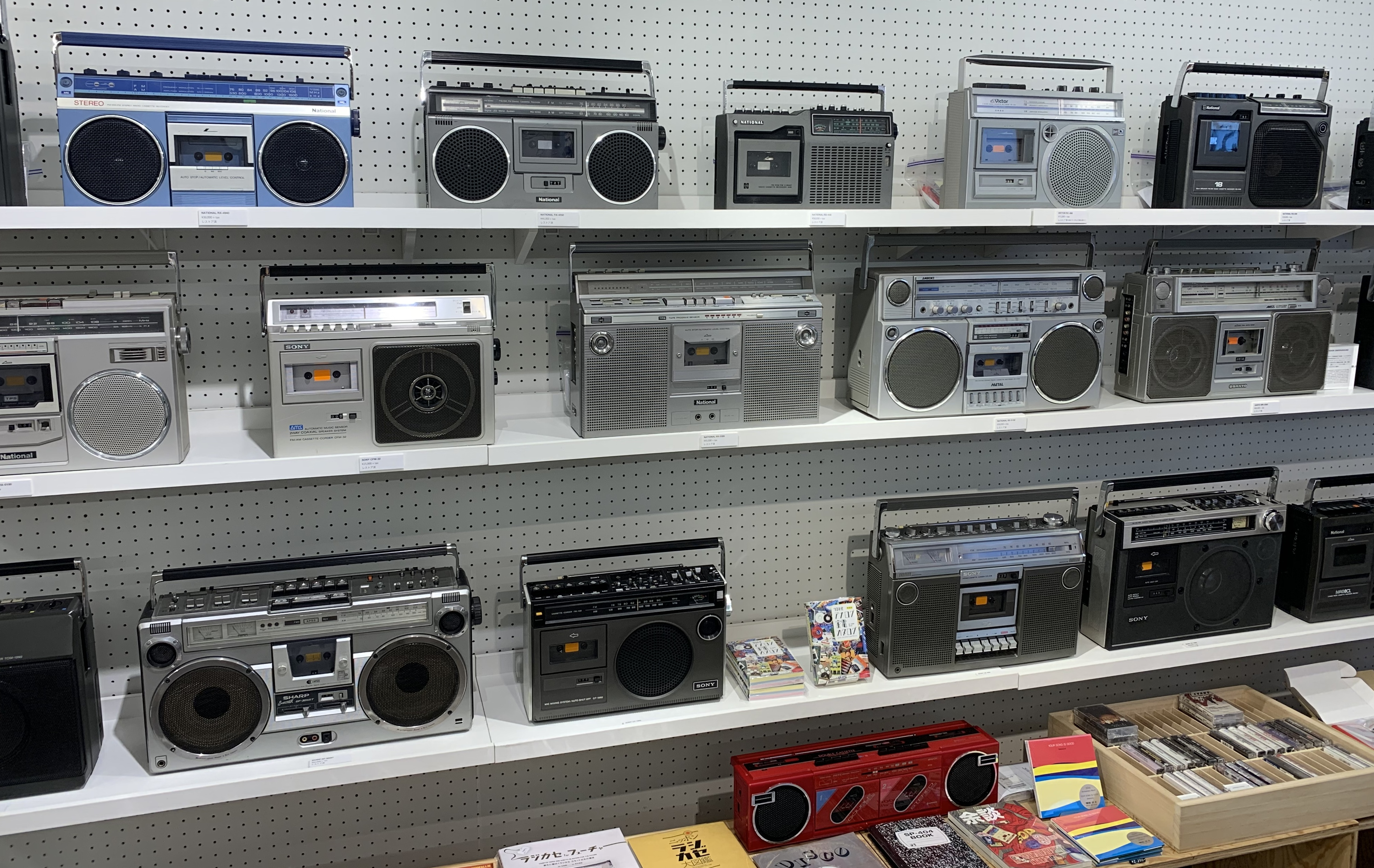
Boomboxes manufactured in Japan and exported to the world in the 1970s and 1980s

A RX5100 National boombox

Boomboxes have been sold in Japan since 1967. The first three manufacturers were Crown, Matsushita (currently Panasonic) and AIWA, and AIWA's TPR-101 was exported from Japan. In the 1970s, Sony, Hitachi, Tokyo Shibaura Electric (Toshiba), Japan Victor (currently JVCKenwood), Mitsubishi Electric, Sanyo Electric, and Sharp Corporation also began to sell boomboxes, and boomboxes soon became popular there due to their compact size and impressive sound quality. The Japanese brands rapidly took over a large portion of the European boombox market and were often the first Japanese consumer electronics brands that a European household might purchase. In some cases, there were even Japanese boomboxes manufactured as O.E.M. for European brands. Japanese brands innovated by creating different sizes, form factors, and technology, introducing such advances as stereo boomboxes, removable speakers, and built-in CD players.

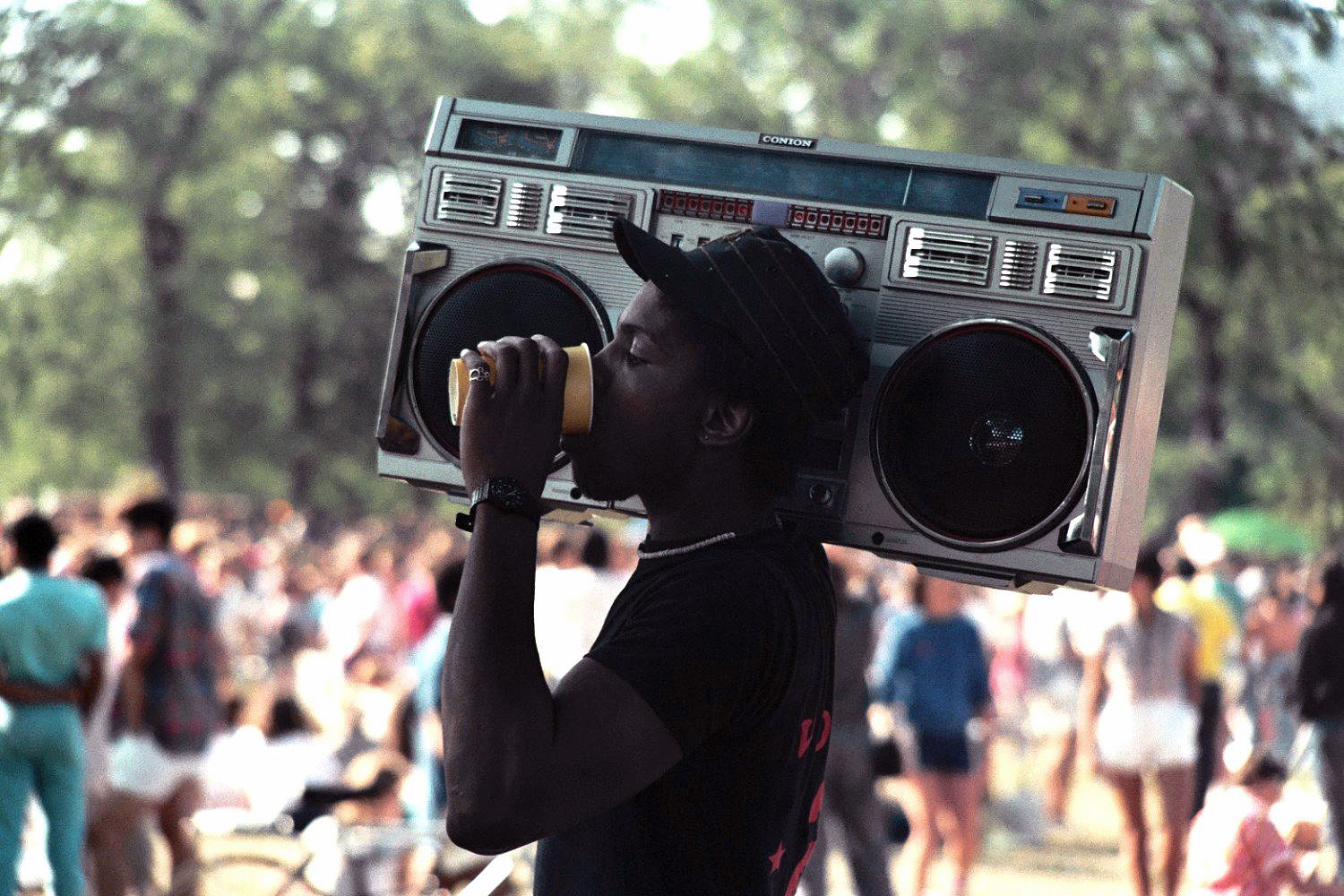
A man holding a C-100F boombox by Conion, an off-brand of Japanese corporation Onkyo at a Chicago Pride Parade ca. 1985

The boombox became popular in America during the late 1970s, with most then being produced by Panasonic, Sony, General Electric, and Marantz. It was immediately noticed by the urban adolescent community and soon developed a mass market, especially in large metropolitan centers such as New York, Los Angeles, and Washington D.C.

The earlier models were a hybrid that combined the booming sound of large in-home stereo systems and the portability of small portable cassette players; they were typically small, black or silver, heavy, and capable of producing high volumes. The effective AM/FM tuner, standard in all early boomboxes, was the most popular feature of the early boombox up until the incorporation of input and output jacks into the boxes, which allowed for the coupling of devices such as microphones, turntables, and CD players.

The development of audio jacks brought the boombox to the height of its popularity, and as its popularity rose, so did the level of innovation in the features included in the box. Consumers enjoyed the portability and sound quality of boomboxes, but one of the most important features, especially to the youth market, was the bass. The desire for louder and heavier bass led to bigger and heavier boxes.

Regardless of the increasing weight and size, the devices continued to become larger to accommodate the increased bass output; newer boombox models had heavy metal casings to handle the vibrations from the bass.

== Design ==
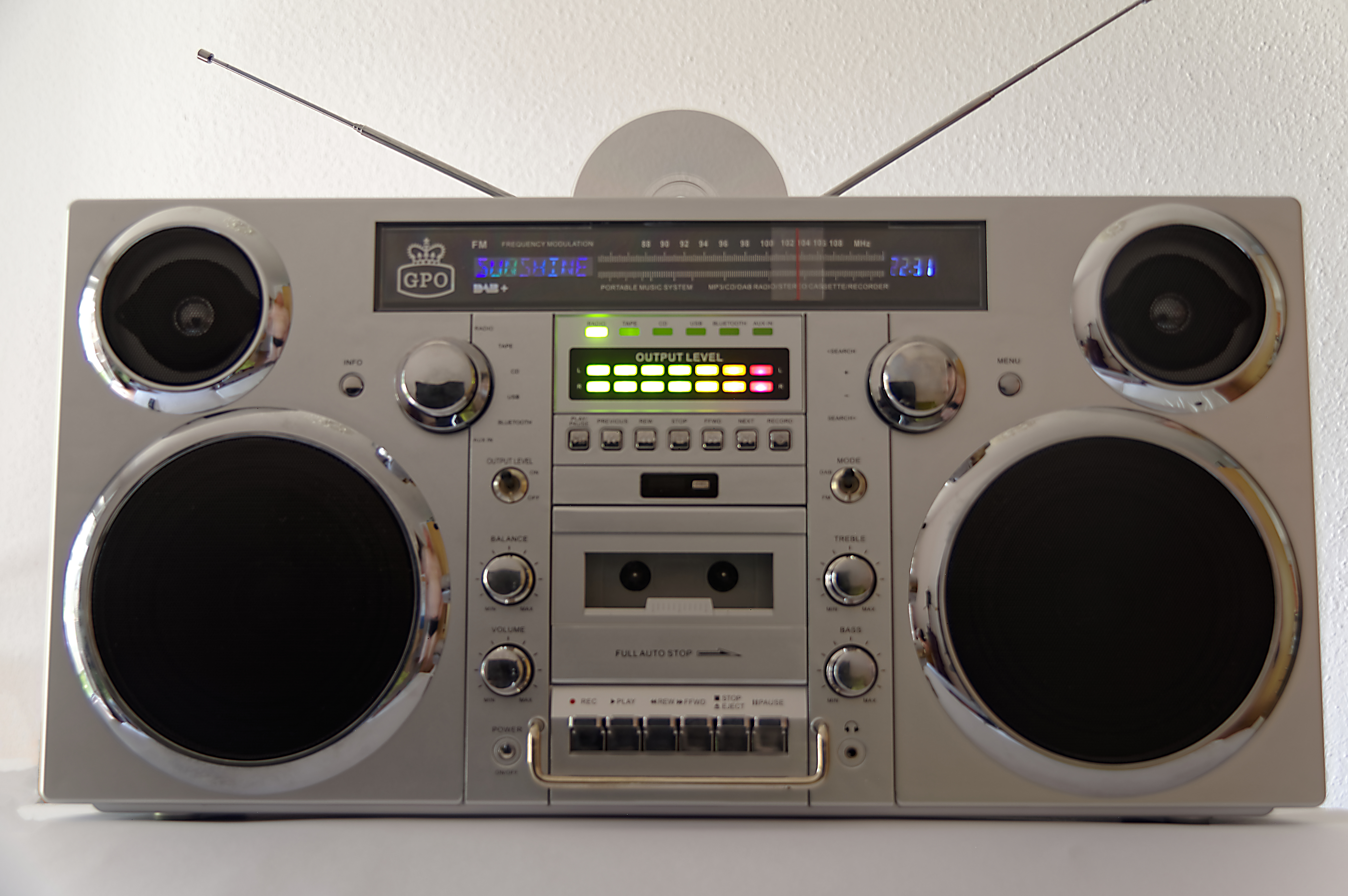
DAB+/FM/MP3-CD/MP3-USB/cassette/Bluetooth GPO Brooklyn legacy recorder boombox by neo-retro chic manufacturing company; ProTelX released on October 2, 2018

A boombox, in its most basic form, is composed of two or more loudspeakers, an amplifier, a radio tuner, and a cassette and/or CD player component, all housed in a single plastic or metal case with a handle for portability. Most units can be powered by AC or DC cables or batteries.

As boomboxes grew in popularity, they also became more complex in design and functionality. By the mid-1980s, many boomboxes included separate high and low frequency speakers and a second tape deck to allow the boombox to record both from the radio and from other pre-recorded cassettes. Equalizers, balance adjusters, Dolby noise reduction, and LED sound gauges were other later additions.

In the mid-1980s, the boombox began to become a status symbol; the popularity among young urbanites caused increasing demand for extravagant boxes. The growing popularity of the compact disc (CD) in the late 1980s led to the introduction of the CD player in standard boombox design. During the 1990s, boombox manufacturers began designing smaller, more compact boomboxes, which were often made out of plastic instead of metal as their counterparts from the previous decade had been.

The rectangular, angular, chrome aesthetic of many 1980s models was frequently replaced with black plastic in the 1990s, and modern designs are typically characterized by a rounded, curved appearance instead of sharp angles. However, the designs of the older models are a source of much interest among boombox enthusiasts and collectors, who frequently seek the larger feature-packed models that represented the cutting edge of portable music technology in their day. Today most boomboxes have replaced the cassette player with iPod docks to access MP3 technology, and some even come equipped with integrated or removable satellite radio tuners.

Boombox designs vary greatly in size. Larger, more powerful units may require 10 or more size-D batteries, may measure more than 76 centimetres (30 in) in width, and can weigh more than 12 kilograms (26 lb). Some take a 12-volt sealed lead-acid battery, or can be a portable enclosure for a car audio head unit.

Audio quality and feature sets vary widely, with high-end models providing features and sound comparable to some home stereo systems. Most models offer volume, tone and balance (left/right) controls.

More sophisticated models may feature dual cassette decks (often featuring high-speed dubbing, or sometimes even digitally controlled servo cassette mechanics), separate bass and treble level controls, five- or ten-band graphic equalizers, Dolby noise reduction, analog or LED sound level (VU) meters or even VFD, larger speakers, 'soft-touch' tape deck controls, multiple shortwave (SW) band reception with fine tuning, digital tuner with PLL (phase-locked loop), automatic song search functions for cassettes, line and/or phono inputs and outputs, microphone inputs, loudness switches, and detachable speakers, full function infrared remote control. A handful of models even featured an integrated record turntable, an 8-track tape player, a minidisc player/recorder, or a (typically black-and-white) television screen, although the basic radio/cassette models have historically been by far the most popular.

== Cultural significance ==
The boombox quickly became associated with urban society, particularly black and Hispanic youth. The wide use of boomboxes in urban communities led to the boombox being coined a "ghetto blaster", a nickname which was soon used as part of a backlash against the boombox and hip-hop culture. The character Radio Raheem in Spike Lee's drama film Do the Right Thing (1989) personifies the connotations associated with "ghetto blasters" and is a prominent example of the boombox's use by urban youth in American media. Cities began banning boomboxes from public places, and they became less acceptable on city streets as time progressed.

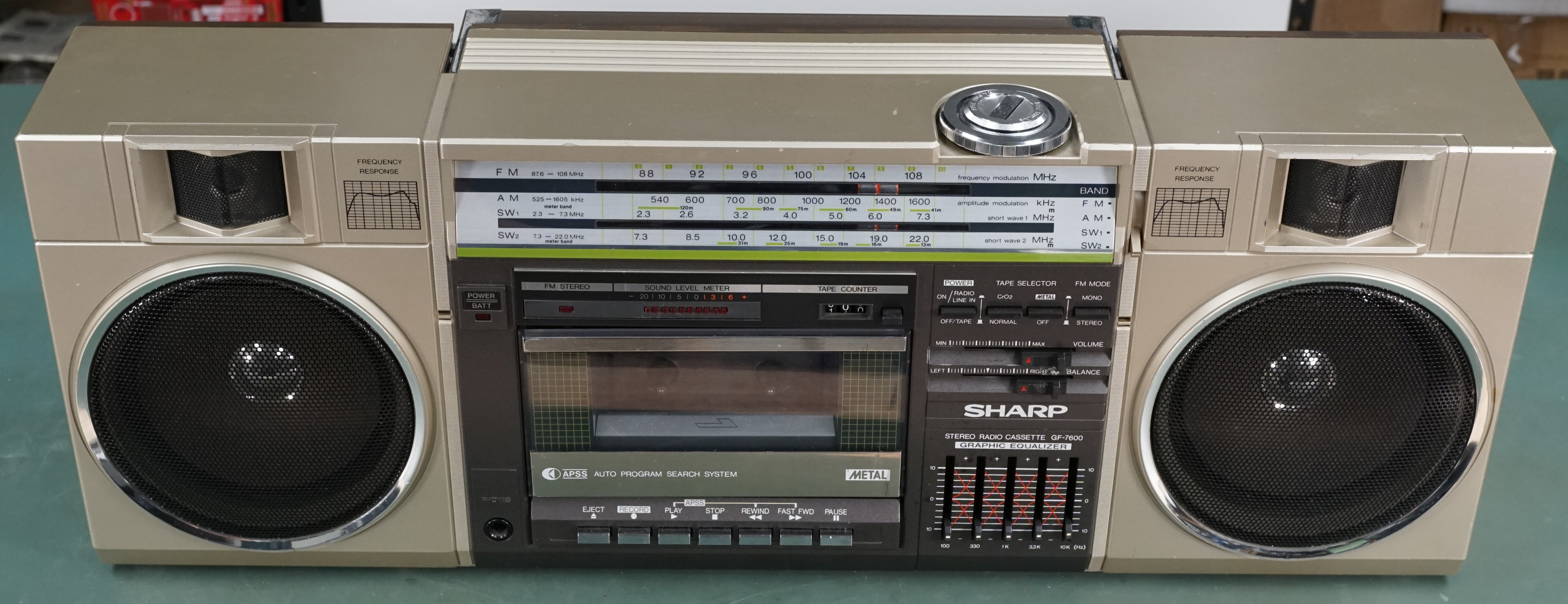
The Sharp GF-7600 boombox that Cusack held above his head

The boombox became intrinsically linked to hip-hop culture and, as Fab Five Freddy puts it, was "instrumental" in the rise of hip-hop. Certain models like the JVC RC-M90 and the Sharp GF-777 were known as the boombox kings, having the power to drown out other ghetto blasters; they were frequently used in music battles. The Beastie Boys embraced the boombox as a signature, The Clash always had a boombox with them, and Schoolly D carried around a Conion C-100F in the UK.

In the 1989 movie Say Anything..., there's a scene where John Cusack holds up a Sharp GF-7600 above his head outside his ex-girlfriend's house, which later became a famous signifier of the boombox culture of the 1980s.. This scene has since been mimicked in many films and TV shows, such in the heavily 1980s-referencing movie Ready Player One (2018).

== Decline ==
The 1990s were a turning point for the boombox in popular culture. The rise of the Walkman and other advanced electronics eliminated the need to carry around such large and heavy audio equipment, and boomboxes quickly disappeared from the streets. As boombox enthusiast Lyle Owerko puts it, "Towards the end of any culture, you have the second or third generation that steps into the culture, which is so far from the origination, it's the impression of what's real, but it's not the full definition of what's real. It's just cheesy." The Consumer Electronics Association reported that only 329,000 boombox units without CD players were shipped in the United States in 2003, compared to 20.4 million in 1986.

== Compressed digital audio and the future of boomboxes ==
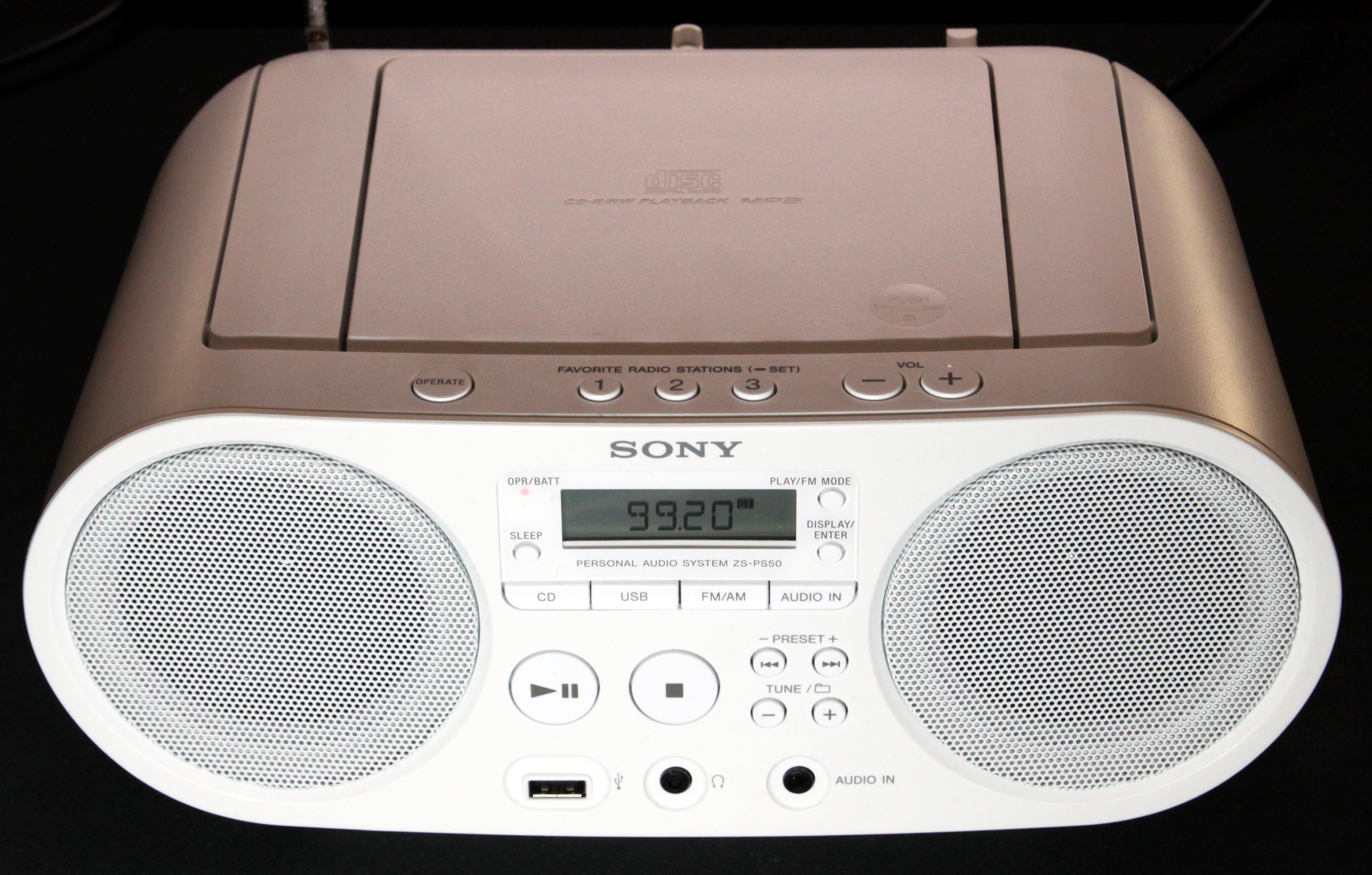
A modern boombox, the Sony ZS-PS50 with MP3 file support via USB drive or CD

Although many boomboxes had dual cassette decks and included dubbing, line, and radio recording capabilities, the rise of recordable CDs, the decline of audio cassette technology, and the popularity of high-density MP3 players and smart phones have reduced the popularity of high-quality boomboxes to such an extent that it is difficult to find a new dual-decked stereo. Dubbing remains popular among audiophiles, bootleggers, and pirates, though most tasks are now accomplished through digital means or analog-to-digital conversion technology.

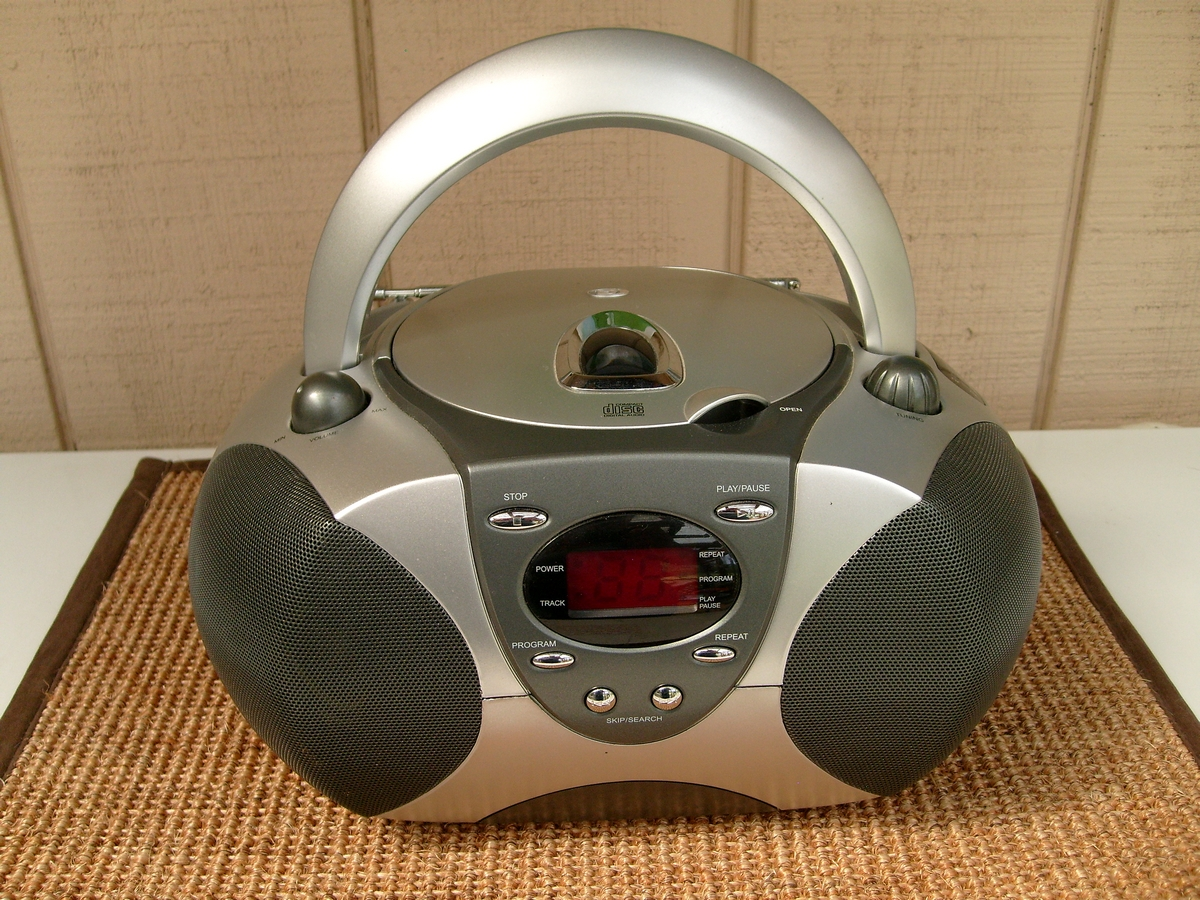
A basic (low-end) boombox, the Durabrand CD-1095 with only track number display, lacking the time indicator

Most modern boomboxes include a CD player compatible with CD-R and CD-RW, which allows the user to carry their own music compilations on a higher fidelity medium. Many also permit iPod and similar devices to be plugged into them through one or more auxiliary ports. Some also support formats such as MP3 and WMA. Some models, typically higher-end, are able to display metadata such as title, artist, album (known as "ID3 tag" on MP3 specifically), file name, and parent folder or file path, on the segment display itself or a separate character row.

The simplest way to connect an older boombox to an MP3 player is to use a cassette adapter, which interfaces an MP3 player's output directly to the cassette player's heads. The 'Line In' (also known as 'Aux In') can be used if the boombox has one.

Some modern boombox designs provide other connections for MP3 (and sometimes other digital formats) such as a USB connector for use with a removable USB drive, slots for various flash memory media such as SD, MMC, SmartMedia, and Memory Stick, or even a CD drive capable of reading MP3s directly from a CD, thus allowing for a relatively cheap and large music storage to be carried and played back at full volume.

Starting in mid-2010, there are new lines of boomboxes that use Bluetooth technology known as Stereo Bluetooth, or A2DP (Advanced Audio Distribution Profile). They use the wireless Bluetooth technology to "stream" audio to the boombox from a compatible Bluetooth device, such as a mobile phone or Bluetooth MP3 player. An example of this is the JAMBOX, which is marketed as a "Smart Speaker" as it can also function as a speakerphone for voice calls in addition to being an audio playback device.

Another modern variant is a DVD player/boombox with a top-loading CD/DVD drive and an LCD video screen in the position once occupied by a cassette deck. Many models of this type of boombox include inputs for external video (such as television broadcasts) and outputs to connect the DVD player to a full-sized television.

Some newer boomboxes, may also have DAB/DAB+ radio, internet radio, or network capabilities and various apps, like TuneIn, Spotify, MusicCast, DLNA, etc. Also they have Wi-Fi, Network RJ45 connection. However, this may limit their portability, as internet access is needed to use them at full potential. Without internet service, they can operate as standard, radio (both FM, AM and DAB), USB and CD player (if available), aux input, and bluetooth (if available).

== Terminology ==
Before the term "boombox" came into widespread use, various other terms were used to describe them.

- Radio cassette player
- Radio cassette recorder
- Stereo radio cassette recorder
- Portable stereo
- Portable stereo system
- Portable radio cassette recorder
- Portable stereo radio cassette recorder

Every day usage, often used shorter terms such as the following.

- Radio
- Stereo
- Boombox
- Ghetto blaster

== See also ==
- Audio player
- AV receiver
- Portable media player
- Radio receiver
- Shelf stereo
- Vehicle audio
- Wireless speaker
