= Radiogram (device) =

Radio receiver / gramophone combination furniture

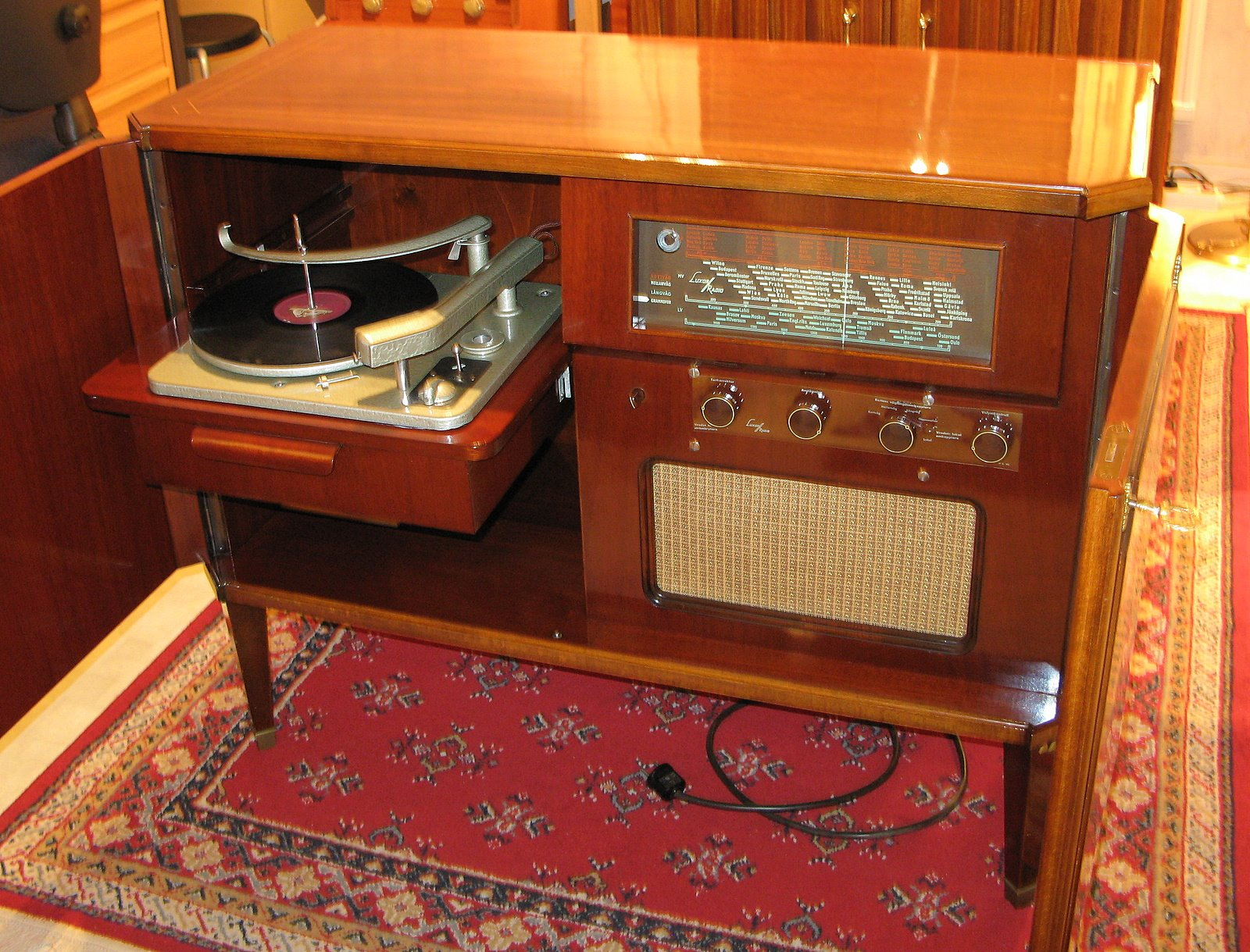
Luxor Empire radiogram from 1948. Typical for the 78 rpm era, the record player is a changer, designed to be loaded with a stack of shellac records.

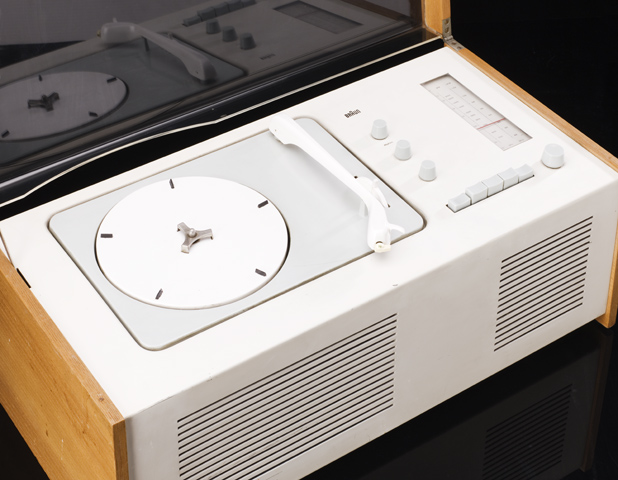
Braun Table Radiogram, Model SK5, c 1962

A man listening to a radiogram in the United Kingdom, 1944

In British English, a radiogram is a piece of furniture that combined a radio and record player. The word radiogram is a portmanteau of radio and gramophone. The corresponding term in American English is console.

== Popularity ==
Radiograms reached their peak of popularity in the post-war era, supported by a rapidly growing interest in records. Originally they were made of polished wood to blend with the furniture of the 1930s, with many styled by the leading designers of the day. An expensive instrument of entertainment for the house, fitted with a larger loudspeaker than the domestic radio, the radiogram soon began to develop features such as the record autochanger, which would accept six or seven records and play them one after another. Certain recordings could be ordered as a box set which would combine the recorded piece in order, to suit an autochanger set-up. In the 1940s and 1950s, sales of the radiogram, coupled with the then-new F.M. waveband, and the advent of the 45 rpm single and the LP record, meant that many manufacturers considered the radiogram to be more important than the fledgling television set sales. Later models took on the modern lines, piano gloss finish and plastic and gilt trim of the 1960s. Stereogram versions became available to take advantage of stereo records. As tape formats grew in popularity, some later models also incorporated reel-to-reel tape decks, cassette decks, or 8-track tape players, or the ability to connect external tape decks.

== Replacement ==
As valve radio development ended in the late 1960s and transistors began to take over, radiograms started to become obsolete. By the late 1970s, they had been replaced by more compact equipment, such as the hi-fi and the music centre.

== Rarity ==
Since radiograms were manufactured in such huge numbers they are not as rare or valuable as TV sets or table radios from the same period. An exception to this are models from certain manufacturers which have become collectable such as Hacker Radio Ltd., Dynatron, Blaupunkt, Braun, and SABA.
