= WFRN =

WFRN may refer to:

- WFRN-FM, a radio station (104.7 FM) licensed to Elkhart, Indiana, United States
- WCMR (AM), a radio station (1270 AM) licensed to Elkhart, Indiana, United States, which held the call sign WFRN from July 1993 to June 2008
