= Orland P. Bassett House =

Historic house in Illinois, United States

- U.S. National Register of Historic Places
- U.S. Historic district – Contributing property
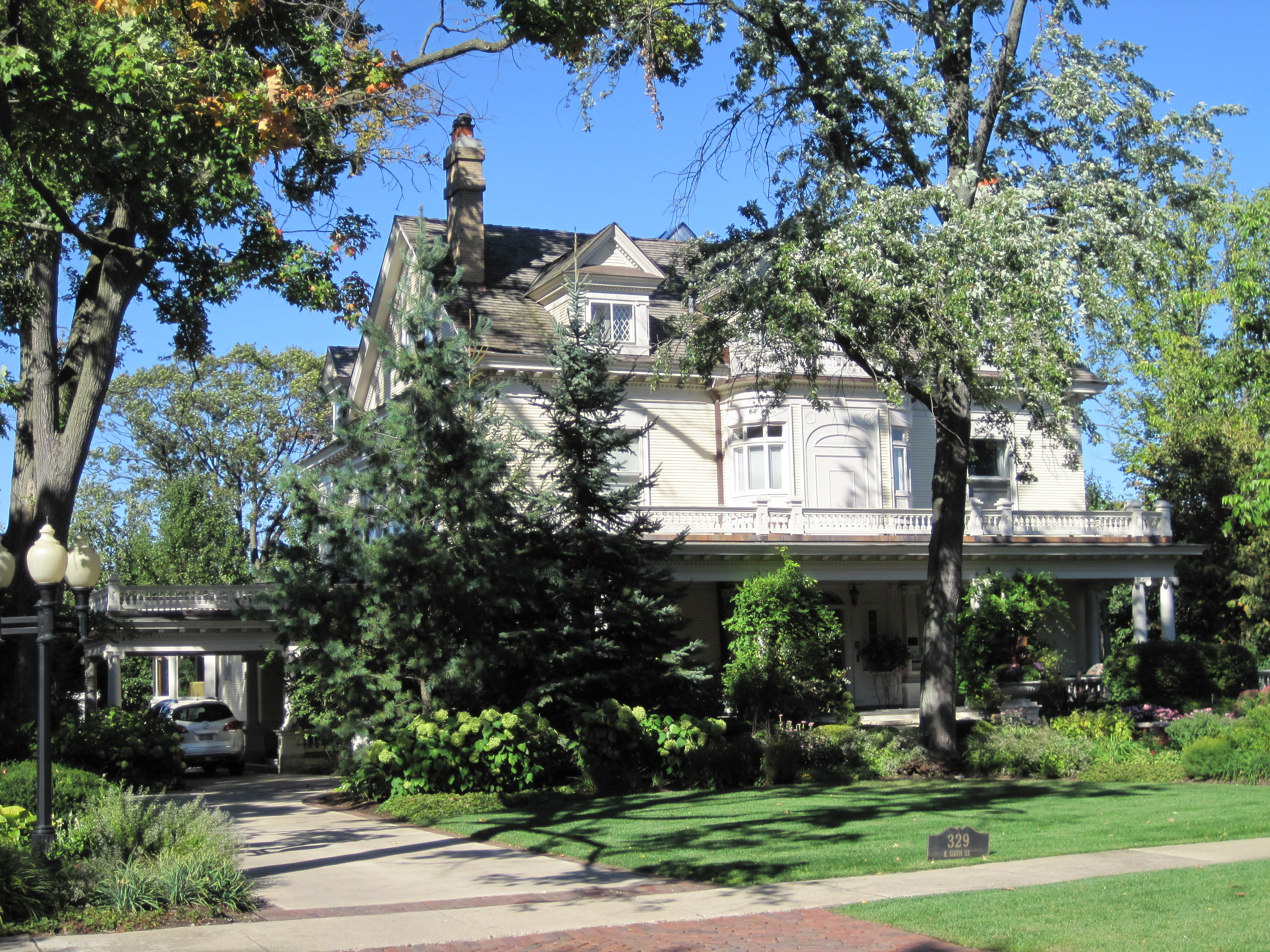

- Location within Illinois Location within the United States
- Location: 329 E. Sixth St., Hinsdale, Illinois, U.S.
- Coordinates: 41°47′55″N 87°55′18″W
- Built: 1899
- Architectural style: Colonial Revival
- NRHP reference No.: 04001299
- Added to NRHP: December 7, 2004

The Orland P. Bassett House, also known as the "American Beauty" House, is a historic Colonial Revival residence in Hinsdale, Illinois.

== History ==
The Orland P. Bassett House, and the accompanying carriage house, were constructed in 1899. Bassett began his career as a printer, moving to Chicago manage the Pictorial Printing Company in 1874. He moved to Hinsdale with his wife in 1887 and began cultivating roses as a hobby. In 1888, he created a hybrid rose known as the American Beauty rose in his greenhouse. He co-founded Bassett & Washburn, which became the first florist to distribute the rose. Commercial horticulture was a relatively new field as Americans had only gained significant disposable income late in the 19th century. One of their largest clients was the Chicago, Burlington and Quincy Railroad, who purchased the roses for use in their dining cars. The company was the largest employer in Hinsdale in 1900. Bassett retired in 1907, passing the business to his son-in-law, and moved to Pasadena, California in 1910. Bassett's grandson Egdar Washburn lived in the residence until 1913, when it was sold to Quaker Oats treasurer Robert Gordon. The house was renovated in 1942.

== Architecture ==
Bassett purchased a plot of land on the corner of Oak and Sixth Street in late 1898 and commissioned contractor Ole Anderson to build it for $25,000. The original architect is unknown—although the plans to the building are intact, there is no indication of who drew them. Enock Hill Turnock remodeled Bassett's former house, "Bonnie Heights", and may have continued a working relationship with Bassett. Given Bassett's occupation, the house was nicknamed the "American Beauty" House by local residents. The house was completed in December 1899. The third floor of the house features a ballroom where the Bassetts held dancing parties. The house was principally built in the Colonial Revival style, but also features elements of Queen Anne Style.
