= Ruthmere Mansion =

Historic house in Indiana, United States

- Albert R. Beardsley House
- U.S. National Register of Historic Places
- U.S. Historic district – Contributing property
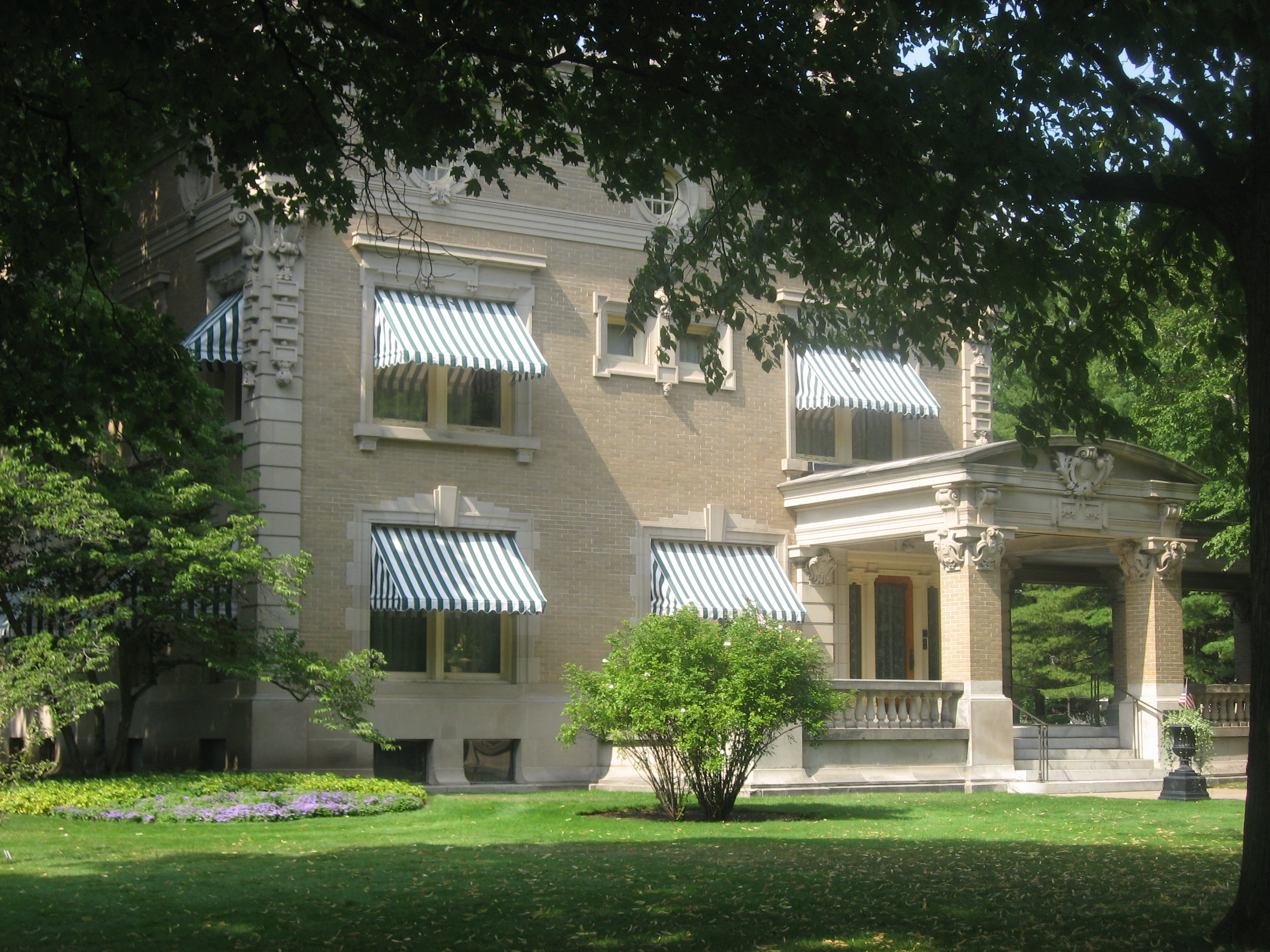
- Front of the Beardsley House

- Location within Indiana Location within the United States
- Location: 302 E. Beardsley Ave., Elkhart, Indiana
- Coordinates: 41°41′36″N 85°58′24″W
- Built: 1908
- Architect: Enock Hill Turnock
- Architectural style: Beaux-Arts
- Part of: Beardsley Avenue Historic District (ID03000979)
- NRHP reference No.: 78000030
- Added to NRHP: November 28, 1978

Ruthmere, formerly the Albert and Elizabeth Beardsley Residence, is a three-story Beaux-Arts mansion that is the most prominent historic residence in Elkhart, Indiana, United States. Built in 1910, the Ruthmere Mansion is now open to the public as a museum, along with the neighboring Dr. Havilah Beardsley House.

Ruthmere is located along the St. Joseph River in Elkhart. The architect was Enock Hill Turnock, commissioned by Albert and Elizabeth Beardsley in 1908. The Beardsleys named the mansion in memory of their only child, Ruth, who died at seven months. ("Mere" reflects the Latin root maris and refers to the home's proximity to water.) The mansion was a place of business, family, political and social gatherings until the deaths of the Beardsleys in 1924. Robert Beardsley of The Beardsley Foundation purchased the mansion in 1967 with the main goal of restoring it to its original beauty in order to create a museum for the community. Restoration took place between 1969 and 1973 when the mansion was made available to the public. The property was placed on the National Register of Historic Places in 1978, and the Beardsley Avenue Historic District was established several years later.

== Interior design and decor ==
Ruthmere is a three-story house with a basement. The first floor consists of the library, drawing room, dining room and kitchen area. The second floor is private bed and bathrooms and the service quarters. The third floor is primarily for storage. The basement has a game room and working area of house (boiler, wash room). There is also a tunnel that connects the game room to the greenhouse.

Cuban mahogany is the primary wood on the first floor. Pomegranates, a symbol of wealth and prosperity, are found throughout the house carved in plaster and wood as well as stenciling on ceilings. Silk wall coverings are used in a majority of the rooms instead of wallpaper. Hand-painted stencils adorn many ceilings. Hand-painted murals of scenes of Italy also adorn walls and windows.

The house also has a fine art collection, part of the museum's collection, displayed throughout the house. You can find Louis Comfort Tiffany lamps and windows as well as Auguste Rodin sculptures.

== Exterior architecture and design ==
Ruthmere was designed by E. Hill Turnock in an eclectic Beaux-Arts style with Prairie School accents. The three-story structure is faced with buff-colored Belden brick from Ohio and native Indiana limestone. Carved stone quoins, capitals, cartouches and window surrounds add exterior interest.

The covered entrance is supported by square brick pillars created by carved limestone capitals. A balustraded marble piazza across the south facade extends to the east side of the building where a porte-cochere protects visitors as they arrive by carriage or car. From the east porch a covered walkway leads to a greenhouse.

The garage is located to the north of the house. Originally the second floor was an apartment for the chauffeur. In 1980, it was turned into The Robert B. Beardsley Arts Reference Library of American Domestic Architecture and Decorative Arts. The library is a free facility, open to the public by appointment. While the materials do not circulate, the library provides copy services as well as reference services. The library's catalog is accessible through the Elkhart Public Library Catalog.

== Facts ==
Albert and Elizabeth Beardsley moved into their home in 1910 and for 14 years, Ruthmere was a place where they entertained friends and business associates. Elizabeth and Albert died within a few months of each other in 1924. Albert's nephew, Arthur Beardsley and his wife Stella lived at Ruthmere until Stella's death in 1940 and Arthur's death in 1944.

The Sherill and Helen Deputy family moved into Ruthmere in 1945, raising six boys in the house—the first and only children to ever call Ruthmere home. In 1969, the Deputys sold Ruthmere to the Beardsley Foundation, which restored the home to its former glory, with the express purpose of creating a museum for the community and the region.
