= Dr. Havilah Beardsley House =

Historic house in Indiana, United States

- U.S. National Register of Historic Places
- U.S. Historic district – Contributing property
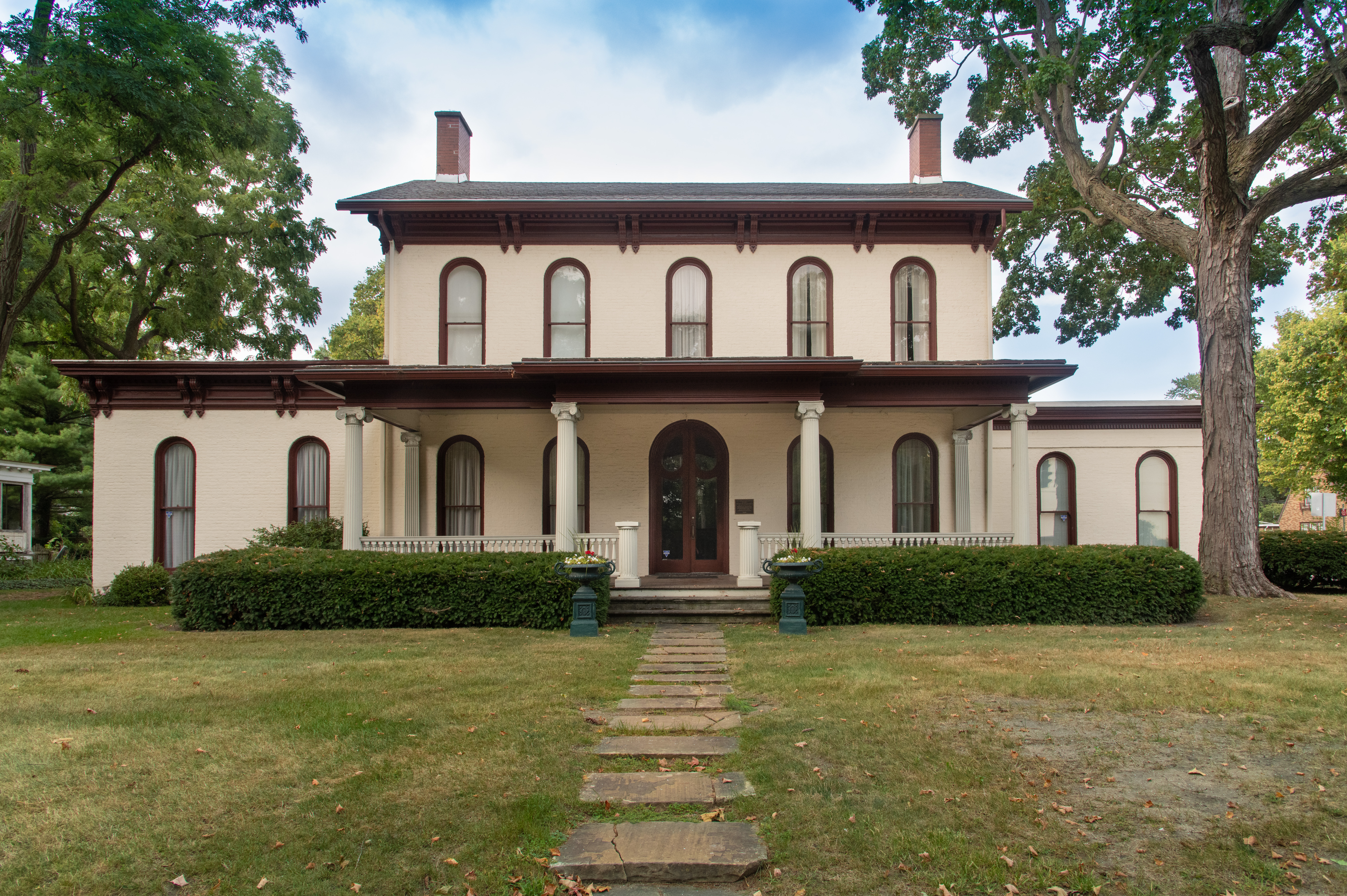
- Havilah Beardsley House front exterior, 2019

- Location within Indiana Location within the United States
- Location: 102 W. Beardsley Ave., Elkhart, Indiana
- Coordinates: 41°41′37″N 85°58′40″W
- Area: less than one acre
- Built: 1848
- Architectural style: Italianate
- NRHP reference No.: 00000716
- Added to NRHP: June 22, 2000

Dr. Havilah Beardsley House is a historic home located at Elkhart, Indiana. It was built in 1848, and is a two-story, rectangular, Italianate style brick dwelling. It has a medium pitched gable roof, full-width front porch with Ionic order fluted columns, rounded openings, and decorative brackets. It has later flanking one-story, flat roofed wings. It was built by Havilah Beardsley, founder of the city of Elkhart. The house is operated as a historic house museum as part of the Ruthmere Mansion complex.

It was added to the National Register of Historic Places in 2000. It is located in the Beardsley Avenue Historic District.
