= Henri Lédéchaux =

Henri Lédéchaux was a French rose breeder based in Villecresnes, Île-de-France.

His roses include

- 'Adolphe Noblet', red blend Hybrid Perpetual, 1861
- American Beauty, Hybrid Perpetual, 1875
- 'Clovis', red Hybrid Perpetual, 1868
- 'Henri Ledéchaux', carmine-pink Hybrid Perpetual, before 1868
- 'Joséphine Lédéchaux', salmon-orange Hybrid Perpetual, 1855
- 'Mademoiselle Adèle Jougant', light yellow Tea, Climber, 1863
- 'Thyra Hammerich', light pink Hybrid Perpetual, 1868
