= Orland P. Bassett =

American floriculturist

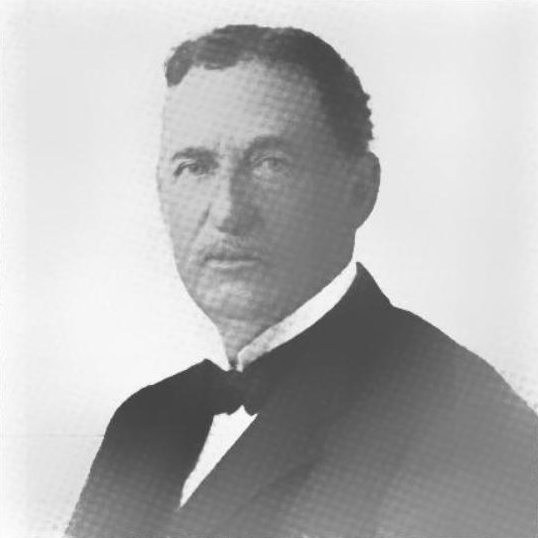
- Born: March 31, 1831; Towanda, Pennsylvania
- Died: February 26, 1921 (aged 89); Pasadena, California
- Occupations: Publisher and floriculturist
- Known for: Commercializing the American Beauty rose

Orland P. Bassett (March 31, 1831 – February 26, 1921) was an American floriculturist who is known for popularizing the American Beauty rose with Bassett & Washburn. He also was the longtime owner of the Pictorial Printing Company.

== Biography ==
Orland P. Bassett was born on March 31, 1831, in Towanda, Pennsylvania. He was the son of John W. Bassett, a wheelwright, though he was raised by his grandparents. He was raised in Towanda and later ran a printing business there. He moved to Sycamore, Illinois, in 1857 to run the Sycamore True Republican newspaper. Bassett printed it for nine years before moving to Chicago, where he worked for several printing houses. He purchased the Pictorial Printing Company in 1874.

In 1887, Bassett moved to Hinsdale. As a hobby, Bassett planted roses on his property and built a greenhouse. One of the roses he planted and cultivated as the American Beauty rose, which he had acquired from Washington. The rose inspired Bassett to form a company to distribute the rose to florists.

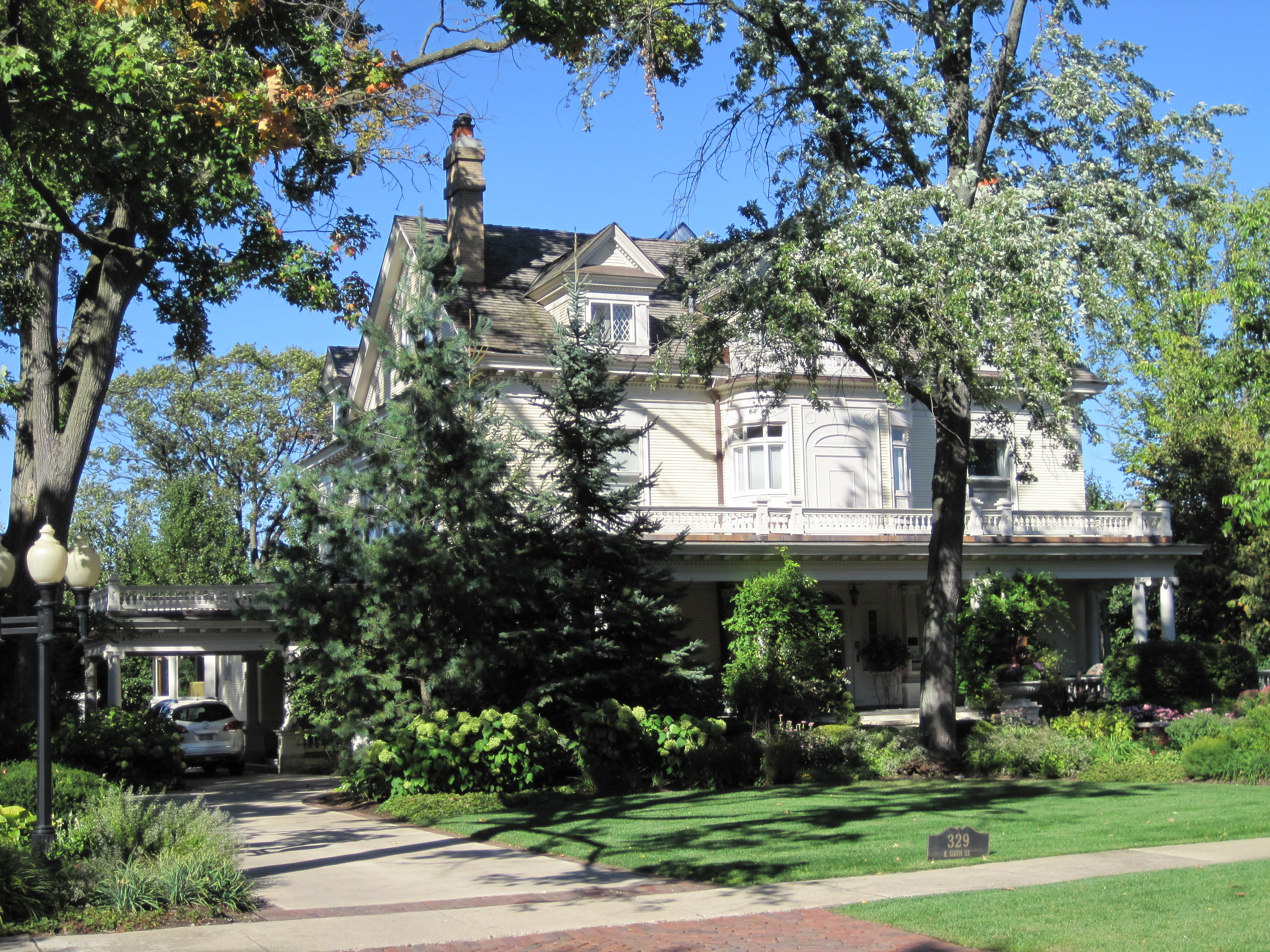
Bassett's house in Hinsdale, known as the "American Beauty House"

Bassett's operation was a fast success, and in 1893, he brought in his son-in-law Charles L. Washburn as a business partner. The roses were popular as they were very large and could be bred as cut flowers. Bassett & Washburn opened an office and store in Chicago and cultivated the plants in Hinsdale. Bassett was also an automobile enthusiast and owned one of the first cars in the Chicago area. By 1900, the greenhouses employed 85 men on a 40-acre (16 ha) site. Bassett & Washburn succeeded in partnering with the Chicago, Burlington, and Quincy Railroad, who used the roses on their dining cars. The company was also among the first to distribute Lawson and Richmond roses. Bassett retired from Bassett & Washburn in 1907 and turned the company over to Washburn. He stayed in Hinsdale for three more years until moving to Pasadena, California, in 1910. Washburn maintained his printing interests with the Pictorial Printing Company until 1916. He died in Pasadena on February 26, 1921, after a long illness.

Bassett married Betsey M. Shelton on April 5, 1858. Betsey Bassett died in January 1897, and Bassett remarried to Mary Katherine Pearsons on December 6, 1898. Bassett was an early supporter of the Republican Party, though later in his life Bassett became politically more independent. He was a member of the Presbyterian Church.
