= Mark L. and Harriet E. Monteith House =

Historic house in Indiana, United States

- U.S. National Register of Historic Places
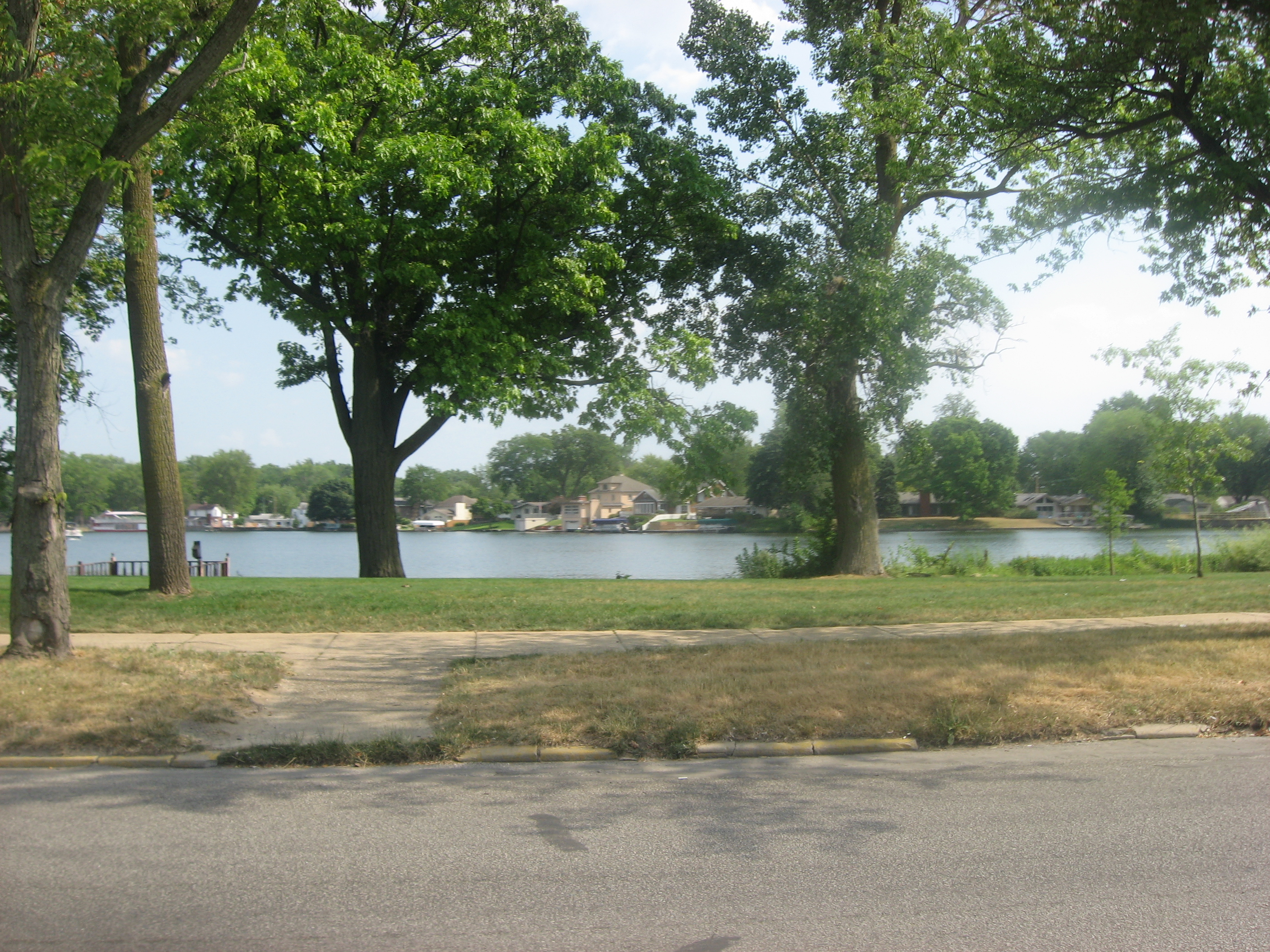
- Mark L. and Harriet E. Monteith House site, July 2012

- Location within Indiana Location within the United States
- Location: 871 E. Beardsley Ave., Elkhart, Indiana
- Coordinates: 41°41′41″N 85°57′48″W
- Area: less than one acre
- Built: c. 1908, 1935
- Architectural style: Tudor Revival
- NRHP reference No.: 85003124
- Added to NRHP: December 26, 1985

Mark L. and Harriet E. Monteith House was a historic home located at Elkhart, Indiana. It was built around 1908, and was a two-story, T-shaped, frame dwelling which was remodeled in the Tudor Revival style in the 1930s. It featured a steeply pitched roof, two-story porch, and brick and half-timbering on the exterior. It has been demolished.

It was added to the National Register of Historic Places in 1985.
