= Green Block =

- U.S. National Register of Historic Places
- U.S. Historic district – Contributing property
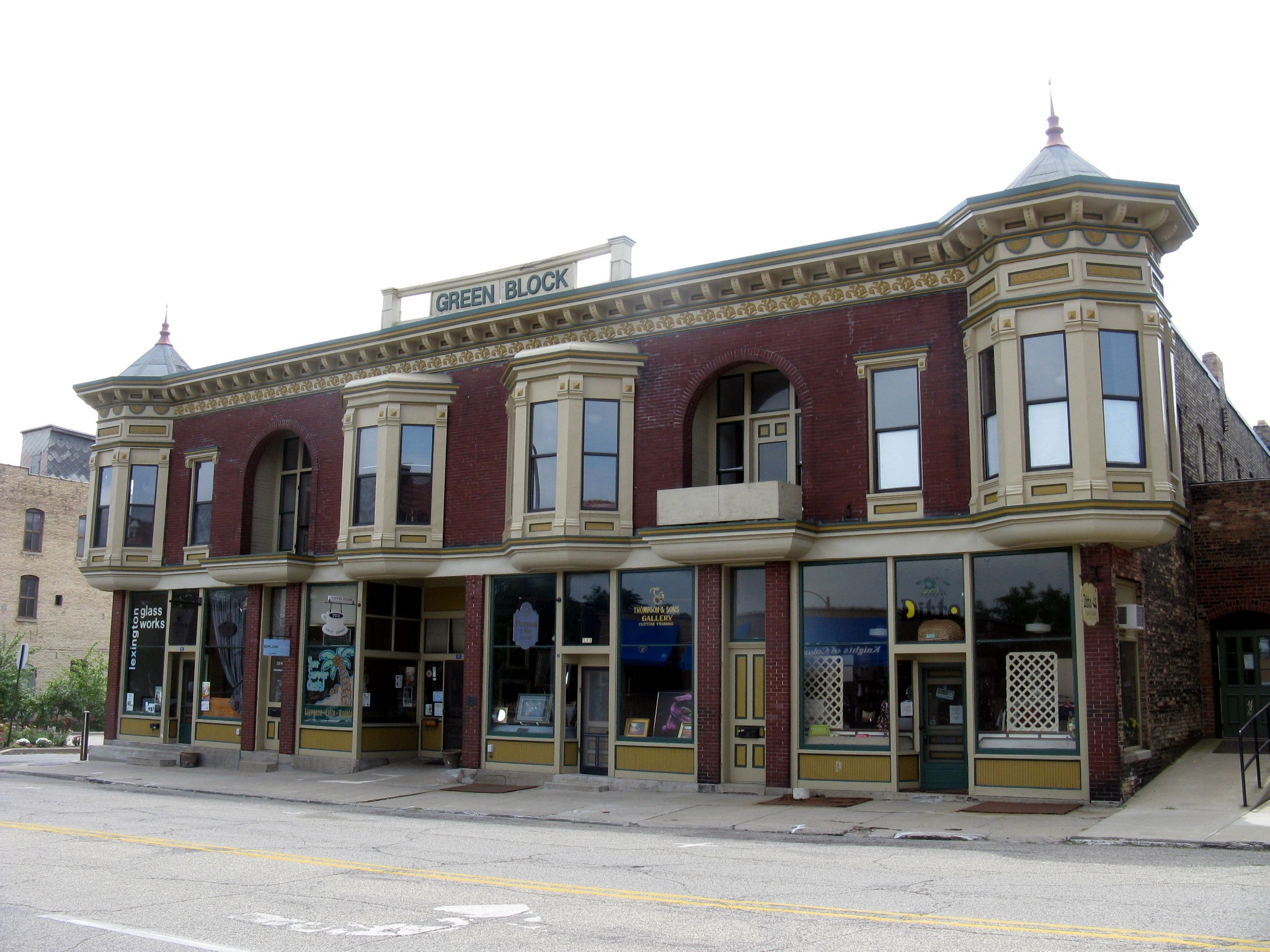
- Green Block, July 2010

- Location within Indiana Location within the United States
- Location: 109-115 E. Lexington, Elkhart, Indiana
- Coordinates: 41°41′11″N 85°58′20″W
- Area: 0.2 acres (0.081 ha)
- Built: 1895
- Architect: Ellwood, A. H.
- NRHP reference No.: 80000035
- Added to NRHP: July 17, 1980

Green Block, also known as the Smith Frye Building, is a historic commercial building located in Elkhart, Indiana. It was built in 1895, and is a two-story, eclectic Italianate style brick commercial building. It features projecting pressed metal bays above each storefront and at the corners and arched second story openings with balconies.

It was added to the National Register of Historic Places in 1980. It is located in the Elkhart Downtown Commercial Historic District.
