= Elkhart, Indiana =

- City
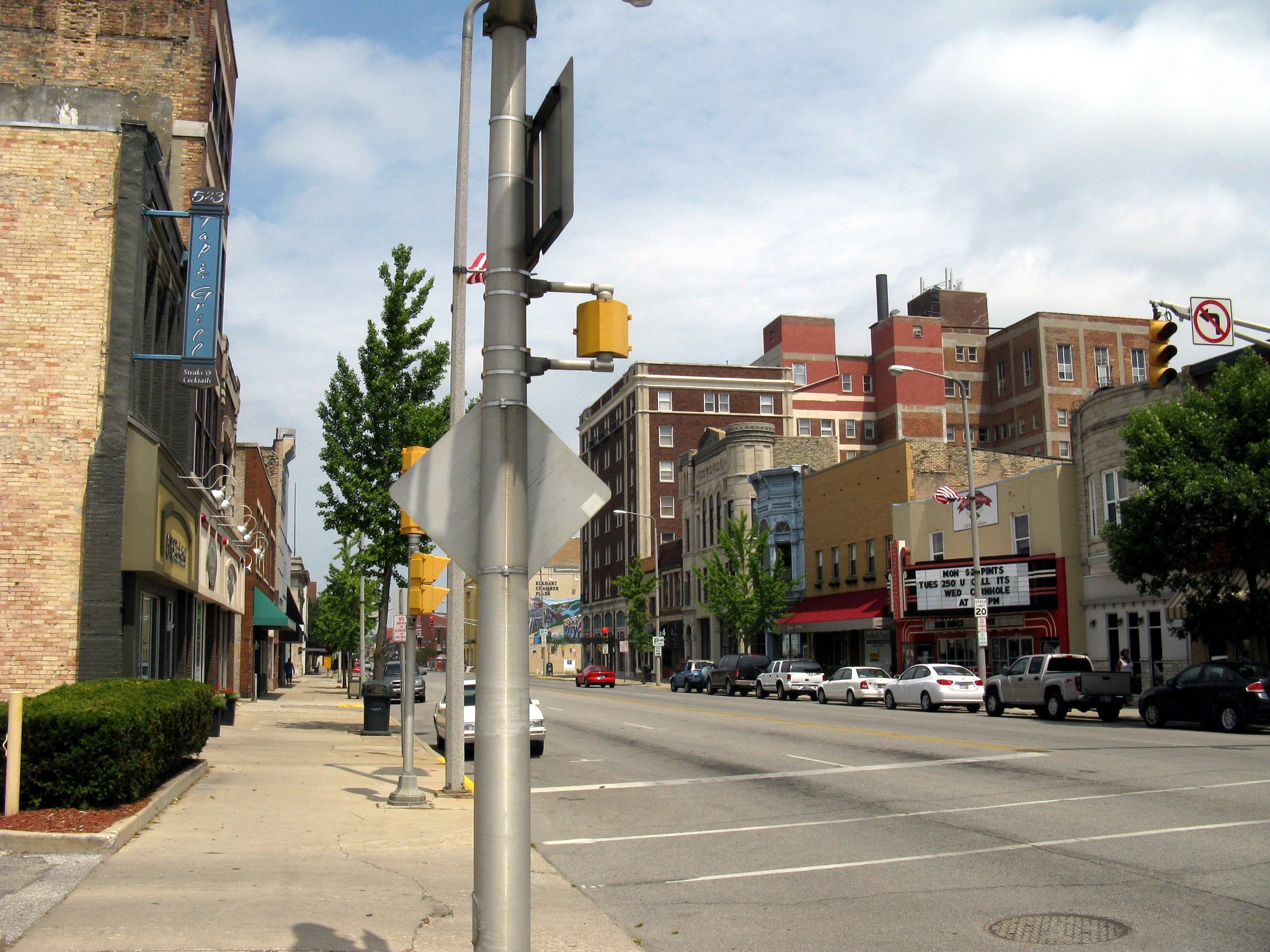
- Main Street in downtown Elkhart

- Flag Logo
- Nicknames: The City with a Heart, Hart City, The RV Capital of the World
- Interactive map of Elkhart, Indiana
- Location within Indiana Location within the United States
- Coordinates: 41°40′59″N 85°58′08″W
- Country: United States
- State: Indiana
- County: Elkhart
- Townships: Concord, Osolo, Cleveland, Baugo, Jefferson, Washington
- Plotted: April 30, 1832
- Incorporated (town): 1858
- Incorporated (city): 1875

Government
  - Type: Mayor - council
  - Mayor: Rod Roberson (D)

Area
  - Total: 28.47 sq mi (73.74 km^{2})
  - Land: 27.51 sq mi (71.25 km^{2})
  - Water: 0.97 sq mi (2.50 km^{2})
- Elevation: 748 ft (228 m)

Population (2020)
  - Total: 53,923
  - Density: 1,960.3/sq mi (756.86/km^{2})
- Time zone: UTC−5 (EST)
  - Summer (DST): UTC−4 (EDT)
- ZIP codes: 46514, 46515, 46516, 46517
- Area code: 574
- FIPS code: 18-20728
- GNIS feature ID: 2394653
- Website: www.cityofelkhartin.gov

Elkhart (/ˈɛlkɑːrt/ EL-kart) is a city in Elkhart County, Indiana, United States. The population was 53,923 at the 2020 census. The city is located 15 miles (24 km) east of South Bend, Indiana. It is the most populous city in the Elkhart–Goshen metropolitan area, which in turn is part of the South Bend–Elkhart–Mishawaka combined statistical area, in a region commonly known as Michiana.

== History ==
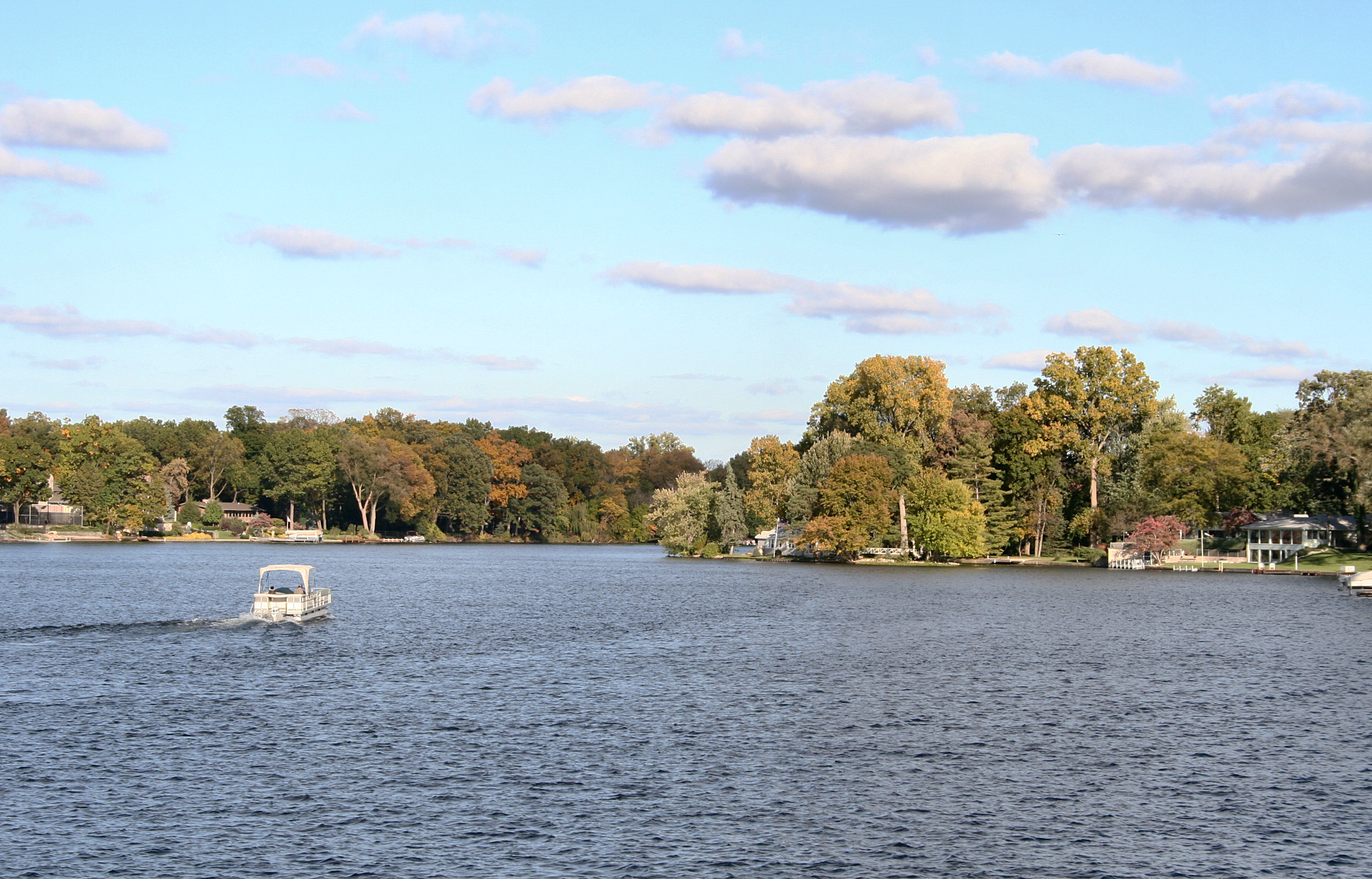
The St. Joseph River widens as it flows west through Elkhart.

In 1829, the Village of Pulaski was established, consisting of a post office, mill, and a few houses on the north side of the St. Joseph River. Dr. Havilah Beardsley moved westward from Ohio, and on August 9, 1821, purchased one square mile of land from Pierre Moran (a half-French, half-Native American Potawatomi Chief) in order to establish a rival town named Elkhart. The town of Elkhart was first plotted with 48 lots on April 30, 1832. In 1839, the Pulaski Post Office was officially changed to Elkhart. Elkhart was incorporated as a town in 1858 and in 1875 as a city.

Elkhart County was founded exclusively by immigrants from New England. These were old-stock "Yankee" immigrants, that is to say, they were descended from the English Puritans who settled New England in the 1600s. The completion of the Erie Canal caused a surge in New England immigration to what was then the Northwest Territory. The end of the Black Hawk War led to an additional surge of immigration, once again coming almost exclusively from the six New England states as a result of overpopulation combined with land shortages in that region. Some of these later settlers were from upstate New York and had parents who had moved to that region from New England shortly after the Revolutionary War. New Englanders and New England transplants from upstate New York were the vast majority of Elkhart County's inhabitants during the first several decades of its history. These settlers were primarily members of various Protestant religions.

Many inhabitants of Elkhart County fought in the Union Army during the Civil War. In the late 1880s and early 1890s Irish and German migrants began moving into Elkhart County. Most of these later immigrants did not move directly from Ireland and Germany, but rather from other areas in the Midwest where they had already been living, particularly the state of Ohio.

By the early 20th century, musical instrument factories, Miles Laboratories (originally Dr. Miles Medical Company), and numerous mills had set up shop and become the base of the economy. In 1934, the first recreational vehicle factory opened in Elkhart. Similar companies followed suit for the remainder of the decade, and the economy continued to grow until the rationing of materials in World War II. After the war, growth picked back up, and, by 1949, Elkhart was dubbed the "RV Capital of the World."

=== Infrastructure ===
In 1851, the Michigan Southern & Northern Indiana Railroad Company built the first rail line through the city, and by 1852 the first passenger train passed through town. This, in turn, caused major population growth. Today, Norfolk Southern has the biggest railroad presence in town, although Elkhart has two other railroads: Shortline-Elkhart and Western (operated by Pioneer Railcorp) and Regional-Grand Elk (operated by Watco). Amtrak has two trains that stop in Elkhart, Lake Shore Limited and Capitol Limited, both of which stop at the Elkhart station. Canadian Pacific runs 6-8 trains through town on Norfolk Southern's trackage.

In 1867, Elkhart Hydraulic Company built the first hydraulic dam across the St. Joseph River which would power the city's machinery. Unfortunately, the hydraulics were prone to flooding as was common in those days, the wooden structures were eventually destroyed by fire. The hydraulics were purchased by the Indiana & Michigan Electric Company and they soon reconstructed the dam and by 1913, it powered the city. Today, the dam still produces electric power and is operated by Indiana Michigan Power, a subsidiary of American Electric Power.

In 1889, the world's second electric streetcar system began operating on the city's streets. It has since been decommissioned.

The Beardsley Avenue Historic District, Albert R. Beardsley House, Dr. Havilah Beardsley House, Emmanuel C. Bickel House, Bridge Street Bridge, Charles Gerard Conn Mansion, Elkhart Downtown Commercial Historic District, Green Block, William and Helen Koerting House, Lerner Theatre, Mark L. and Harriet E. Monteith House, Morehous Residential Historic District, State Street-Division Street Historic District, and Young Women's Christian Association are listed on the National Register of Historic Places.

=== Name ===
The name Elkhart is a deliberate misspelling or corruption of "Elks-heart", which refers to the now extinct Eastern elk. The name has been attached to the Elkhart River and surrounding area since at least 1749, when it was recorded in French as Coeur de cerf ("elk's heart") as the name of a Miami village there. The place name in Miami-Illinois is mihšiiwiateehi ("elk's heart"). Later in the 18th century the area was inhabited by the Potawatomi; in the Potawatomi language, the place is likewise known as mzewəodeʔig, "at the elk heart".

The name may reflect a prehistoric association of the Elkhart area with the Kaskaskia people, whom the Miami called "elk hearts". The Kaskaskia are not associated with the area in any historical records, however, having been pushed further south and west by the wars of the 17th century.

Other explanations have been suggested. According to an account by two Miami leaders (Jean Baptiste Richardville and Le Gros) recorded in 1824, the name arose from two women fighting over an elk's heart that had been hung up to dry. Alternatively, some historians including Jacob Piatt Dunn have associated the name with the shape of an island in the Elkhart River that is stated to resemble an elk's heart.

== Geography ==
According to the 2010 census, Elkhart has a total area of 24.417 square miles (63.24 km^{2}), of which 23.45 square miles (60.74 km^{2}) (or 96.04%) is land and 0.967 square miles (2.50 km^{2}) (or 3.96%) is water.

The city sits on the St. Joseph and Elkhart Rivers. The Elkhart River drains into the St. Joseph at Island Park just north of downtown. There are also numerous small lakes around the city.

=== Climate ===
Elkhart has a humid continental climate (Köppen Dfa), with cold, snowy winters and warm, humid summers.

Climate data for Elkhart, Indiana
Month	Jan	Feb	Mar	Apr	May	Jun	Jul	Aug	Sep	Oct	Nov	Dec	Year
Mean daily maximum °F (°C)	29 (−2)	31 (−1)	43 (6)	56 (13)	67 (19)	76 (24)	81 (27)	79 (26)	72 (22)	59 (15)	45 (7)	31 (−1)	56 (13)
Mean daily minimum °F (°C)	13 (−11)	15 (−9)	25 (−4)	34 (1)	44 (7)	54 (12)	59 (15)	57 (14)	50 (10)	39 (4)	29 (−2)	18 (−8)	36 (2)
Average precipitation inches (mm)	2.4 (61)	1.8 (46)	2.8 (71)	3.4 (86)	3.6 (91)	3.7 (94)	3.5 (89)	3.6 (91)	3.4 (86)	3.1 (79)	2.9 (74)	2.6 (66)	36.6 (930)
Average snowfall inches (cm)	18.5 (47)	14.0 (36)	10.0 (25)	3.9 (9.9)	0.7 (1.8)	0 (0)	0 (0)	0 (0)	0 (0)	1.7 (4.3)	8.5 (22)	16.9 (43)	74.2 (188)
Source: Weatherbase

== Demographics ==
Historical population
Census	Pop.	Note	%±
1860	1,439		—
1870	3,265		126.9%
1880	6,953		113.0%
1890	11,360		63.4%
1900	15,184		33.7%
1910	19,282		27.0%
1920	24,277		25.9%
1930	32,949		35.7%
1940	33,434		1.5%
1950	35,646		6.6%
1960	40,274		13.0%
1970	43,152		7.1%
1980	41,305		−4.3%
1990	43,627		5.6%
2000	51,874		18.9%
2010	50,949		−1.8%
2020	53,923		5.8%
U.S. Decennial Census

=== Racial and ethnic composition ===
Elkhart city, Indiana – Racial and ethnic composition Note: the US Census treats Hispanic/Latino as an ethnic category. This table excludes Latinos from the racial categories and assigns them to a separate category. Hispanics/Latinos may be of any race.
Race / Ethnicity (NH = Non-Hispanic)	Pop 2010	Pop 2020	% 2010	% 2020
White alone (NH)	29,565	26,354	58.03%	48.87%
Black or African American alone (NH)	7,705	7,384	15.12%	13.69%
Native American or Alaska Native alone (NH)	154	118	0.30%	0.22%
Asian alone (NH)	430	571	0.84%	1.06%
Native Hawaiian or Pacific Islander alone (NH)	20	21	0.04%	0.04%
Other race alone (NH)	95	248	0.19%	0.46%
Mixed race or Multiracial (NH)	1,529	2,689	3.00%	4.99%
Hispanic or Latino (any race)	11,451	16,538	22.48%	30.67%
Total	50,949	53,923	100.00%	100.00%

=== 2020 census ===
As of the 2020 census, Elkhart had a population of 53,923. The median age was 33.7 years. 27.6% of residents were under the age of 18 and 13.4% of residents were 65 years of age or older. For every 100 females there were 95.1 males, and for every 100 females age 18 and over there were 92.5 males age 18 and over.

100.0% of residents lived in urban areas, while 0.0% lived in rural areas.

There were 20,562 households in Elkhart, of which 34.9% had children under the age of 18 living in them. Of all households, 34.6% were married-couple households, 22.3% were households with a male householder and no spouse or partner present, and 32.8% were households with a female householder and no spouse or partner present. About 31.1% of all households were made up of individuals and 11.8% had someone living alone who was 65 years of age or older.

There were 22,404 housing units, of which 8.2% were vacant. The homeowner vacancy rate was 1.8% and the rental vacancy rate was 8.7%.

Racial composition as of the 2020 census
Race	Number	Percent
White	28,556	53.0%
Black or African American	7,574	14.0%
American Indian and Alaska Native	525	1.0%
Asian	589	1.1%
Native Hawaiian and Other Pacific Islander	36	0.1%
Some other race	10,267	19.0%
Two or more races	6,376	11.8%
Hispanic or Latino (of any race)	16,538	30.7%

=== 2010 census ===
As of the census of 2010, there were 50,949 people, 19,261 households, and 11,942 families residing in the city. The population density was 2,172.7 inhabitants per square mile (838.9/km^{2}). There were 22,699 housing units at an average density of 968.0 per square mile (373.7/km^{2}). The racial makeup of the city was 66.1% White, 15.4% African American, 0.6% Native American, 0.9% Asian, 0.1% Pacific Islander, 12.9% from other races, and 4.1% from two or more races. Hispanic or Latino of any race were 22.5% of the population.

There were 19,261 households, of which 36.9% had children under the age of 18 living with them, 36.7% were married couples living together, 18.5% had a female householder with no husband present, 6.7% had a male householder with no wife present, and 38.0% were non-families. 30.8% of all households were made up of individuals, and 10.5% had someone living alone who was 65 years of age or older. The average household size was 2.60, and the average family size was 3.25.

The median age in the city was 32.7 years. 29.1% of residents were under 18; 9.4% were between the ages of 18 and 24; 27.5% were from 25 to 44; 22.5% were from 45 to 64, and 11.5% were 65 years of age or older. The gender makeup of the city was 48.2% male and 51.8% female.

=== 2000 census ===
As of the 2000 census, 51,874 people, 20,072 households, and 12,506 families reside in the city. The population density was 2,428.0 inhabitants per square mile (937.5/km^{2}). There were 21,688 housing units at an average density of 1,015.1 per square mile (391.9/km^{2}). The racial makeup of the city was 71.5% White (predominantly German American), 14.7% African American, 0.4% Native American, 1.2% Asian, 0.1% Pacific Islander, 9.2% from other races, and 2.9% from two or more races. Hispanic or Latino of any race were 14.8% of the population.

Of the 20,072 households, 62.3% were occupied by families, 33.4% had children under 18 living with them, 40.9% were married couples living together, 15.3% had a female householder with no husband present, and 37.7% were non-families. 30.3% of all households were made up of individuals, and 10.3% had someone living alone who was 65 years of age or older. The average household size was 2.55, and the average family size was 3.16.

Of the city's population, 28.4% was under 18, 11.1% from 18 to 24, 31.7% from 25 to 44, 18.0% from 45 to 64, and 10.7% was 65 years of age or older. The median age was 31 years. For every 100 females, there were 96.9 males. For every 100 females aged 18 and over, there were 94.6 males.

The median income for a household in the city was $34,863, and the median income for a family was $40,514. Males had a median income of $30,674 versus $22,760 for females. The per capita income for the city was $17,890. About 11.1% of families and 13.6% of the population were below the poverty line, including 18.6% of those under age 18 and 9.0% of those age 65 or over.

== Economy ==
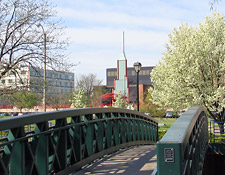
Downtown Elkhart from the Riverwalk

Elkhart boasts a growing shopping scene on its Northeast side along CR 6, as well as a vibrant small business sector on Main Street. The Concord Mall closed in 2023. A second shopping mall, Pierre Moran Mall, was partially demolished in 2006 for a new development called Woodland Crossing.

=== Industry ===
Elkhart is best known for two industries: recreational vehicles and musical instruments (for example, Stephanhöuser Saxophones). For decades, it has been referenced as the "RV Capital of the World" and the "Band Instrument Capital of the World". Other notable industries in Elkhart include; pharmaceuticals, electronic components, manufactured housing and mobile homes. Numerous manufacturers of musical instruments and accessories, of which most of the surviving companies have been absorbed into the Conn-Selmer conglomerate, have a long history in the city. Elkhart is also home to the Robert Young Rail Yards, which are the second-largest freight classification yards in the world.

In 1884, Franklin Miles launched the Miles Medical Co. in Elkhart, which in later decades produced products such as Alka-Seltzer and Flintstones Vitamins. The Miles Medical Co. was purchased by the German company Bayer in 1978, and was consolidated into the larger Pittsburgh-based Bayer, Inc. in 1994. In 1999, Bayer Consumer Care moved out of Elkhart. By 2006, Bayer had pulled all manufacturing out of Elkhart. Most of the facilities were torn down while just a few buildings remained, mostly unused.

Manufacturers in Elkhart include Forest River Inc, Hy-Line, Keystone, and Thor Motor Coach.

NIBCO INC. (Northern Indiana Brass Company), has called Elkhart home for over 100 years and is now a fifth-generation family business. NIBCO Inc. manufactures and markets flow control products.

Elkhart Brass Manufacturing manufactures fire-fighting equipment.

Elkhart's unemployment rate reached 18.8% in April 2009 and the city and some of its unemployed residents were featured on the February 8, 2009, edition of ABC News. The unemployment rate rebounded over the next decade and has remained below the national average since 2013.

== Arts and culture ==
=== Theater ===
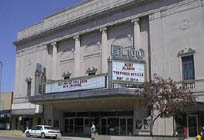
The front of the Lerner Theater, then named the ELCO, in downtown Elkhart

In 1884, the Bucklen Opera House opened its doors for the first time, with a seating capacity of 1200. It was common for one performance to take place every week. Elkhart's location on the railroad made it a good stopping point for shows traveling from New York to Chicago. In 1896, the first movie was shown in the theater, which was also used as Elkhart High School's auditorium until 1924. The Bucklen was demolished in 1986.

The Lerner Theatre, formerly the ELCO Performing Arts Center, is a small theater located downtown. After being built in 1924 and undergoing two name changes, it became the ELCO in 1934. Ownership switched hands several times, but the end of the Lerner appeared to be in sight when owner William Miller died in 1987. In 1990, the city bought the theater to prevent further deterioration due to vacancy. Also, that year, some locals formed a commission to oversee the restoration. Funding issues led the city to get involved further in the form of getting a federal grant. The grant helped with major upgrades and the hiring of full-time staff.

The ELCO was renamed The Lerner when it reopened after an $18 million renovation and expansion in June 2011. It is now used for a wide range of concerts, special events, and local productions.

=== Museums ===
There are many different museums located in the city.

- Woodlawn Nature Center is a small natural history museum and activity center that includes 10 acres of woods.
- The Midwest Museum of American Art has over 6,000 works in its collection and offers 8–10 temporary showings per year.
- The National New York Central Railroad Museum tells the history of the New York Central, Penn Central, Amtrak and Conrail railroads. Conrail established the Rail Yards in Elkhart which is now owned by Norfolk Southern.
- The RV/MH Hall of Fame & Museum was once located in the city but has now been moved to a new facility along the toll road. Elkhart County is known as the RV Capital of the World.
- The Ruthmere Museum was the mansion once occupied by Albert R. and Elizabeth Baldwin Beardsley, the descendants of the city's founder. This museum features a world-class fine arts collection and a historical recreation of the home as it was in the 1910s and 20s.
- The Havilah Beardsley House is also part of the Ruthmere Museum Campus. Built in 1848, this home once belonged to the founder of Elkhart, Havilah Beardsley. Today, it has been restored to the style of the 1870s, at which time Havilah's son, James Rufus Beardsley, gutted and remodeled the entire home into its current Italianate style.

=== Events ===
The Elkhart Jazz Festival is a three-day event that takes place in late June on the banks of the Elkhart River. It is known as one of the premier Jazz festivals in the nation. In 2007, the festival celebrated its 20th anniversary.

Each June, the Elkhart Parks and Recreation Department presents Rhapsody Arts & Music Festival (formally called Rhapsody in Green). It is a weekend event put on at the city's Island Park. It is a typical summer festival with live music and food.

Also, the Elkhart Air Show was an annual event that took place at the Elkhart Municipal Airport at the end of July. It featured a wide variety of airplanes old and new. The event was canceled in 2007 due to financial issues. It is unclear whether the show is on hiatus or gone for good.

=== Public library ===
The city is served by the Elkhart Public Library, which operates four branches.

== Sports ==
The Elkhart Miracle is a proposed independent minor league baseball team that was scheduled to begin to play in the Northern League in 2015. The stadium was to be located on the city's southwest side on State Road 19. As of December 2017, the stadium had not yet been built, and the team was not formed, due to construction delays. As of May 2023, the team played at NorthWood Field of Dreams in Nappanee, Indiana.

The Elkhart Express was a semi-professional men's basketball team in the International Basketball League. Their home games were played at North Side Gymnasium, located inside Elkhart's North Side Middle School. The franchise began operation in 2006 and won the International Title in 2006 and 2007. The Elkhart Express officially released news that they were folding under bankruptcy on January 5, 2009. In January 2010, head coach and founder Daimon Beathea announced that the Express would return for the 2010 season, but those plans never came to fruition.

== Parks and recreation ==
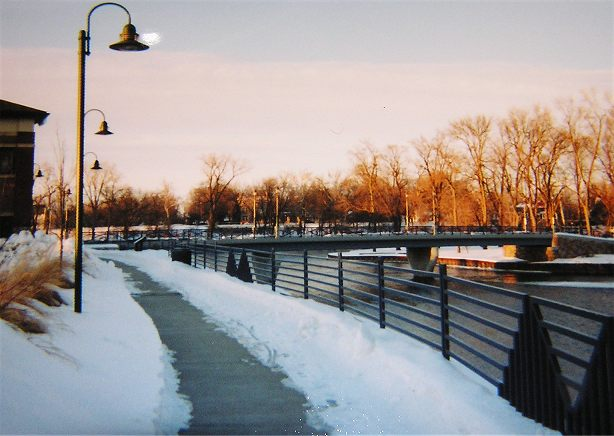
Elkhart's downtown riverwalk on a wintry evening

The city has 35 different facilities including parks, pavilions, a waterpark, a public pool, a softball complex, two skateparks, greenways, and the downtown riverwalk, which now features an ice-skating/roller-blading path (depending on the time of year).

The NIBCO Water and Ice Park in downtown Elkhart was dedicated in 2007. It is a year-round park with an ice skating path in the winter and a splash pad in the summer. A spray park was built at McNaughton Park in 2007.

Rainbow Park is notable because it is both a park and a residential front yard. It is a popular recreation destination for the house owners and their houseguests.

Wellfield Botanic Gardens on North Main Street is a 36-acre "living museum" offering over 20 individually themed gardens and public events throughout the year.

== Government ==
The mayor of Elkhart is Rod Roberson, a Democrat, and the first African American to be elected mayor. The government consists of a mayor and a city council. The mayor is elected in a citywide vote. The city council consists of nine members—six are elected from individual districts, while three are elected at large.

== Education ==
=== Public schools ===
Three school districts serve sections of Elkhart:

- The Baugo Community Schools serve the southwest side of the city and the west central part of the county. That system is made up of one elementary school (Jimtown Elementary), an intermediate, a junior high, and a high school each named Jimtown.
- The Concord Community Schools serve the southeast side of the city of Elkhart and northwest Goshen. This system consists of four elementary schools (East Side, Ox Bow, South Side, and West Side), an intermediate school, a junior high school, and a high school, all named Concord.
- The Elkhart Community Schools, the largest district, serve most of the city and the populated northwest side of the county. The system includes fourteen elementary schools (Beardsley, Bristol, Cleveland, Eastwood, Hawthorne, Mary Beck, Mary Daly, Mary Feeser, Monger, Osolo, Pinewood, Riverview, Roosevelt, and Woodland), three middle schools (North Side, Pierre Moran, and West Side), one high school, split between two buildings (Elkhart High School and The Freshman Division), one alternative school (L.I.F.E / Tipton Street Center), and the Elkhart Area Career Center. However; Oslo, Woodland, Pinewood, and Mary Beck have been approved by the Elkhart Community School Board for closure, due to decreased enrollment.

=== Private schools ===
In addition to the public schools, four private religious schools serve the city. Elkhart Christian Academy (grades K-12), Trinity Lutheran School (K-8), St. Vincent de Paul Catholic School (grades K-8), and St. Thomas the Apostle School (grades K-8) are located in Elkhart. Additionally, Two private secular schools exist: The Montessori School of Elkhart on Montessori Drive runs from pre-K through Grade 6. Cornerstone Christian Montessori School (K-6)

=== Higher education ===
- Anabaptist Mennonite Biblical Seminary has been at its south-side location since 1958.
- Bethel College of neighboring Mishawaka has a small location on the city's south side.
- Beulah Bible College & Seminary has been at its southwest location since 1995. It is the first H.B.C. in Elkhart.
- Indiana Institute of Technology has a small operation on Middlebury Street on the city's east side.
- Indiana University South Bend, which is the third largest of the Indiana University campuses, operates an Elkhart Center located in the city's downtown area. The center moved to its downtown location in August 2007.
- Ivy Tech Community College is a statewide system of community colleges, as well as the second-largest institution of higher education in the state of Indiana, and has a campus directly off County Road 17, which is a fast-growing commercial and industrial corridor.

== Media ==
The Elkhart Truth is the main newspaper that serves the city of Elkhart and the county.

Elkhart lies in the South Bend-Elkhart television market, the 89th largest in the United States as of 2008. One television station, WSJV-TV (Heroes & Icons Network) is located in the city, along with a number of radio stations including WTRC, WAOR, WCMR, WFRN-FM, and WVPE (NPR). Elkhart is also served by television station WSBT-TV (CBS, with Fox on DT2), based in Mishawaka, and six stations in South Bend: WNDU-TV (NBC), WNIT-TV (PBS), WHME-TV (Univision), WBND-LD (ABC), WCWW-LD (CW) and WMYS-LD (MyNetworkTV, with Telemundo on DT2).

== Transportation ==
=== Major roads ===
Elkhart is located on the Indiana Toll Road (Interstates 80/90) at exits 92 and 96 and on the eastern portion of the St. Joseph Valley Parkway (U.S. Route 20) which bypasses the southern side of the city. State Road 19 runs through the city while U.S. Route 33 and State Road 120 terminate in the city. U.S. 33 used to run through the city, and that route was part of the original Lincoln Highway.

=== Rail ===
Amtrak, the national passenger rail system, serves the Elkhart Train Station. Two routes, the Capitol Limited and Lake Shore Limited, stop at the station, along the former New York Central Railroad line. The Capitol Limited connects Chicago to Washington, DC and the Lake Shore Limited connects Chicago to New York City and Boston. Both lines connect to their eastern destinations via Cleveland with one train offered for each direction on each route daily.

=== Airports ===
Elkhart Municipal Airport (EKM) is located on the city's northwest side. No commercial flights are offered, but two charter flight services operate out of the airport. South Bend International Airport (SBN) is the closest airport with commercial airline service.

The Mishawaka Pilots Club Airport (3C1) is just outside the southwest edge of the city of Elkhart. Mishawaka Pilots Club Airport is a privately owned, public-use facility.

=== Interurban Trolley ===
Elkhart is a central hub for the Interurban Trolley regional public bus service, which stops at various destinations throughout the city and connects it to neighboring Goshen, Osceola, Dunlap and Mishawaka. It was originally known as the BUS system. The system's name is derived from its use of vintage-trolley-style buses that run between several different cities and towns, evoking the interurban train networks that were common in the United States during the first half of the 20th century. The Interurban Trolley operates each day, except Sundays or major holidays.

Bittersweet/Mishawaka Route links up with TRANSPO's Route 9 in Mishawaka, which in turn connects riders to downtown South Bend and the South Shore Station, TRANSPO's transit hub. North Pointe Route stops at Elkhart's Greyhound station. Elkhart-Goshen and Concord route both stop near the Elkhart Train Station.

== Notable people ==
- Erich Barnes, football player
- Harold S. Bender, theologian
- Lindsay Benko, gold medalist Olympic swimmer
- Jordan Burt, soccer player
- Charles G. Conn, founder of Conn Musical Instruments
- Lou Criger, first Opening Day catcher in Boston Red Sox history
- David Darling, classical cellist
- Nancy DeShone, All-American Girls Professional Baseball League player
- Andrea Drews, United States women's national volleyball team
- Ernestine Evans, prominent journalist, editor, and literary agent
- Tracy Ferrie, musician
- Ric Flauding, classical composer
- Farrah Forke, actress
- Bill Frink, sportscaster
- John F. Funk, publisher and Mennonite leader
- Charles Gordone, Pulitzer Prize dramatist
- David Gundlach, an insurance company founder and film producer
- Jean Hagen, actress, lead role in Singin' in the Rain
- Thomas Hampson, baritone
- Amber Jacobs, WNBA basketball player
- Ernie Jones, NFL player (wide receiver)
- Shawn Kemp, former NBA basketball player
- Paul W. Klipsch, founder, Klipsch Audio Technologies
- Alan Kreider, church historian
- Robert Lim (1897 – 1969) Chinese doctor and Lieutenant General in the Republic of China Army
- Dessamae Lorrain (1927 – 2011), archaeologist
- Deirdre Lovejoy, actress
- Ted Luckenbill, NBA basketball player
- Clarence C. Moore, engineer, supporter of HCJB and founder of Crown International
- Philip Myers, principal horn player with the New York Philharmonic
- Carrie Newcomer, musician, singer, songwriter
- Peter Reckell, actor
- Gale Sayers, Chicago Bears, Elkhart County resident.
- Joe Schoen, NFL general manager
- Connie Smith, country musician, singer, songwriter
- Robert Spano, music director of the Atlanta Symphony Orchestra and the Brooklyn Philharmonic
- Shafer Suggs, Ball State and NFL player
- George Terlep, professional football player, coach, and general manager
- Enock Hill Turnock, architect
- Georgy Vins, pastor, human right activist, Soviet dissident
- Rich Wingo, linebacker for the Green Bay Packers
- James Wylder, writer and publishing CEO of Arcbeatle Press.
- John Howard Yoder, theologian and ethicist

== Twin towns and sister cities ==
Elkhart has four sister cities as designated by Sister Cities International.

- Burton upon Trent, England, United Kingdom
- Kardzhali, Bulgaria
- Tongxiang, China
- Apan, México
