= Elkhart Downtown Commercial Historic District =

Historic district in Indiana, United States

- U.S. National Register of Historic Places
- U.S. Historic district
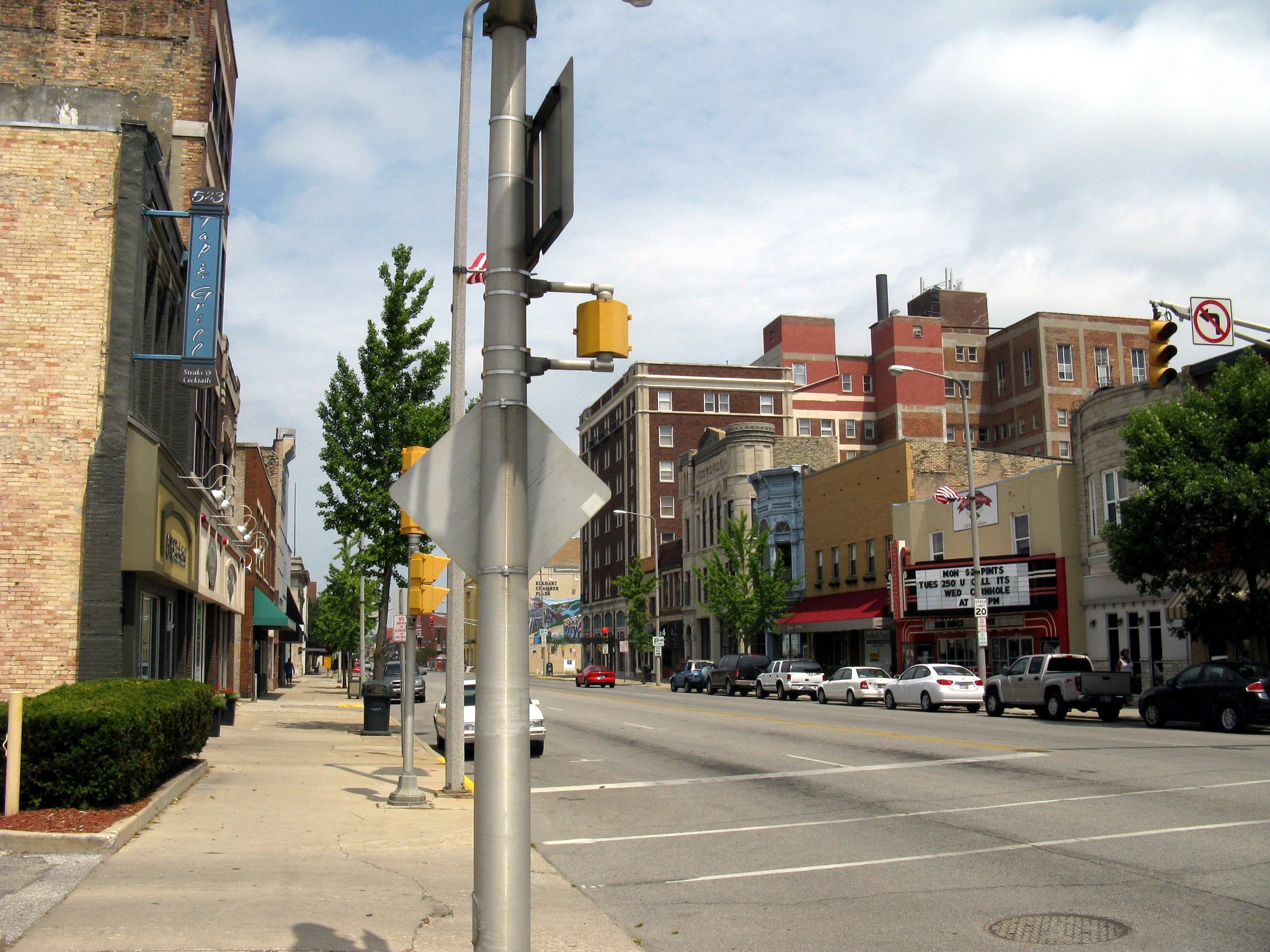
- Elkhart Downtown Commercial Historic District, July 2010

- Location within Indiana Location within the United States
- Location: Roughly along Main St., roughly bounded by E. Jackson, and Second Sts., Waterfall Dr., and Tyler Ave., Elkhart, Indiana
- Coordinates: 41°41′04″N 85°58′18″W
- Area: 24.1 acres (9.8 ha)
- Built: 1868
- Architect: Turnock, Enoch Hill
- Architectural style: Italianate, Queen Anne, Classical Revival
- NRHP reference No.: 97001178
- Added to NRHP: September 26, 1997

Elkhart Downtown Commercial Historic District is a national historic district located at Elkhart, Indiana. The district encompasses 59 contributing buildings in the central business district of Elkhart. It was developed between about 1868 and 1930, and includes notable examples of Italianate, Queen Anne, and Classical Revival style architecture. Located in the district are the separately listed Green Block, Lerner Theatre, and Young Women's Christian Association. Other notable buildings include the Cornish Block (c. 1875), Franklin Street Station (1895), Menges Building (1908), former Post Office (1905), Midwest Museum of Modern Art (1922), Elkhart Water Company, Masonic Temple, Rowe Block (1900), and Dreves Building (c. 1915).

It was added to the National Register of Historic Places in 1997.

In 2024, The Fort Wayne Railroad Historical Society, in collaboration with the City of Elkhart and the National New York Central Railroad Museum, is initiating the American Locomotive Project.
