= Philip Myers (musician) =

- Born: Philip F. Myers; June 24, 1949 (age 77); Elkhart, Indiana, U.S.
- Instrument: French horn
- Education: Carnegie Mellon University (BM, BM)

Philip F. Myers (born June 24, 1949) is an American French horn virtuoso and pedagogue. In 2017, he retired from his post as principal horn of the New York Philharmonic and remains active as a soloist worldwide.

== Early life and education ==
Myers was born in Elkhart, Indiana. He attended Carnegie Mellon University from 1967 to 1971, where he studied French horn with the renowned Forrest Standley. During the summers of 1970 and 1971, Myers attended the Blossom Festival, where he studied music with the principal horn of the Cleveland Symphony Orchestra, Myron Bloom.

== Career ==
From 1980 to 2017, Myers was the principal horn of the New York Philharmonic and frequently appeared as soloist with the orchestra. Before arriving at the New York Philharmonic, he was principal horn of the Atlantic Symphony Orchestra in Halifax, Nova Scotia, from 1971 to 1974, third horn of the Pittsburgh Symphony Orchestra from 1974 to 1977, and principal horn of the Minnesota Orchestra from 1978 to 1980. Myers is on the faculty at the Haute École de Musique, part of the Lausanne Conservatory in Fribourg, Switzerland.

In 1990, he performed with the Naumburg Orchestral Concerts, in the Naumburg Bandshell, Central Park, in the summer series.

Myers released his first solo CD under Cala Records in 1998, which features music by Leonard Bernstein and David Amram, among others. Myers can also be heard on Take 9, featuring the horns of the New York Philharmonic and the American Horn Quartet., as well as a New York Philharmonic digital release, featuring a 2011 recording of Richard Strauss's Horn Concerto No. 1.

In August 2014, Myers was elected an honorary member of the International Horn Society at the 46th International Horn Symposium in London.
