= Lerner Theatre =

- The Lerner Theatre
- U.S. National Register of Historic Places
- U.S. Historic district – Contributing property
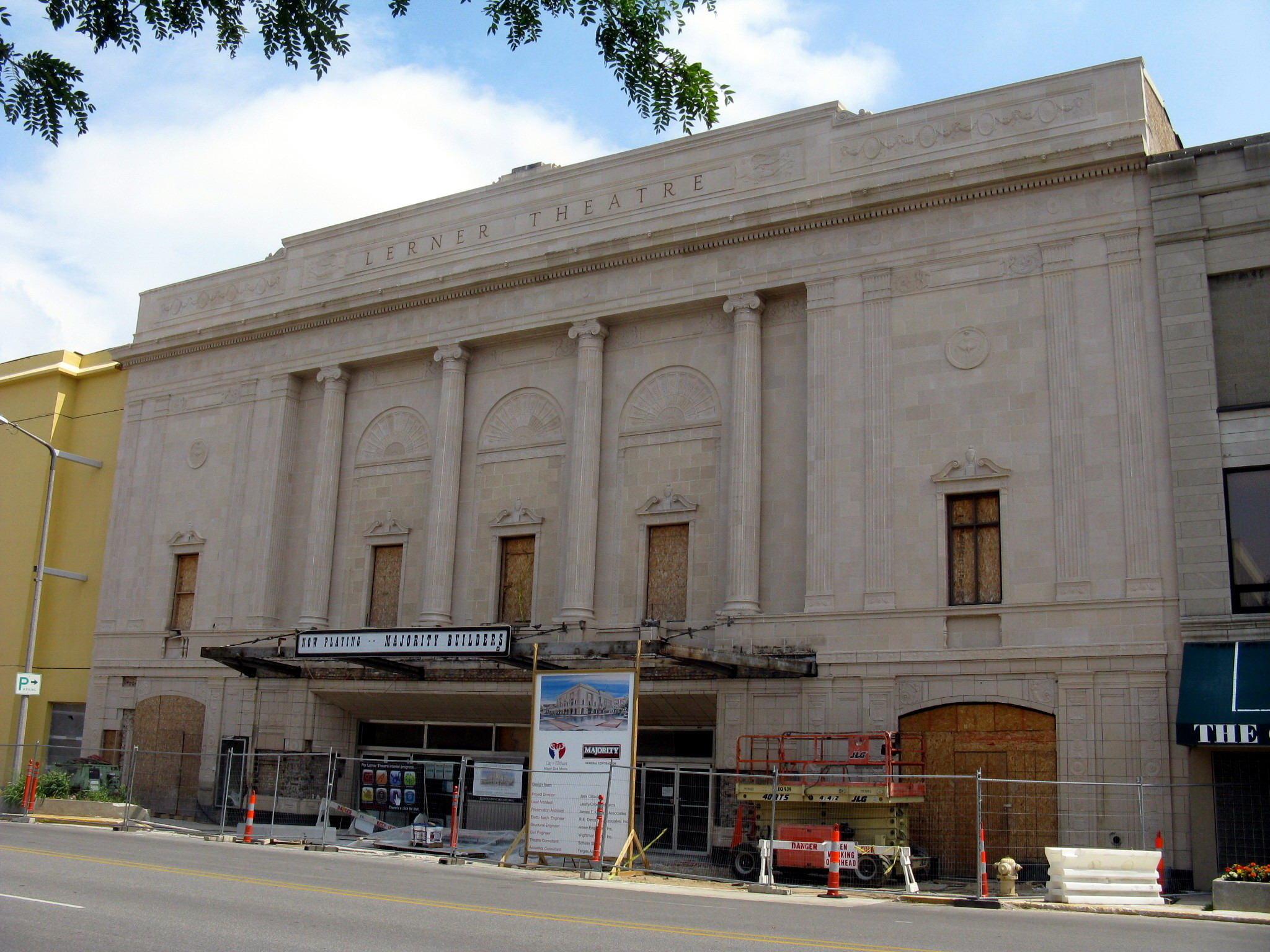
- Lerner Theatre, July 2010

- Location within Indiana Location within the United States
- Location: 410 S. Main St., Elkhart, Indiana
- Coordinates: 41°41′2″N 85°58′18″W
- Area: less than one acre
- Built: 1924
- Architect: Lerner, Harry E.; Vitchum, K. V.
- Architectural style: Beaux Arts
- NRHP reference No.: 80000036
- Added to NRHP: October 2, 1980

The Lerner Theatre, previously known as the Elco Theatre, is a historic theatre located at Elkhart, Indiana, United States.

== History ==
The Lerner Theatre was built in 1924, after Harry E. Lerner commissioned Chicago architect K. V. Vitchum to design it. Built as a vaudeville theatre, by the late 1920s it had evolved into a motion picture palace.

Lerner sold it to Warner Brothers in 1932, who operated it for a couple of years under the name Warner Theatre. They redecorated it in red and gold and added the distinctive "waterfall curtain", and a "huge vertical marquee spelling out the theatre's name in bold letters" out the front. After Warner Brothers went bankrupt, the Indiana-Illinois Theatre took over in 1934. They held a contest to rename it, with Elco Theatre chosen as the winning name.

In 1940, Manta & Rose Theatres acquired the Elco in 1940 and operated it for 20 years. They modernized it and took down the old vertical marquee, replacing it with a horizontal one.

In 1961 the building was purchased by Miller Theaters, Inc., run by William Miller and his family, until it was closed in 1987. It was added to the National Register of Historic Places in 1980.

In 1990 Premier Arts, a non-profit group, purchased the Elco, intending to restore it for use as a performing arts venue. During the mid-1990s the city of Elkhart became involved, obtaining with funding from the National Endowment for the Arts. In 1996 restoration work began and the theatre was restored to its 1920 design. The Elco Commission for the Performing Arts was created in 1997.

Renovation continued into the 21st century, and it reverted to its original name, Lerner Theatre.

== Description ==
The theatre is a two-story, reinforced concrete and steel, Beaux-Arts style building. The front facade features four Corinthian order columns, three freestanding urns, enriched cornice, parapet and frieze. The building is faced with terra cotta and has a lighted canopy projecting over the sidewalk. The auditorium features a large central dome measuring 30–40 ft (9.1–12.2 m) in diameter.

It is located in the Elkhart Downtown Commercial Historic District.
