= Dessamae Lorrain =

American archaeologist (1927–2011)

- Born: Dessie Mae Hart; July 25, 1927; Elkhart, Indiana, U.S.
- Died: July 23, 2011 (age 83); Alpine, Texas, U.S.
- Occupations: Archaeologist, nurse

Dessamae Hart Lorrain (July 25, 1927 – July 23, 2011) was an American archaeologist. She was a staff archaeologist at Southern Methodist University's Anthropology Research Center. Most of her projects involved salvage work, excavating Texas historic sites ahead of major construction in the 1960s and 1970s.

== Early life and education ==
Dessie Mae Hart was born in Elkhart, Indiana, the daughter of R. E. Hart and Crystal Edessa Young Hart. She attended Newcomb College, and graduated from Tulane University with a degree in physics. She pursued graduate studies in archaeology at the University of Texas.

== Career ==
Lorrain was a staff archaeologist at Southern Methodist University's Anthropology Research Center, and a member of the Texas Archaeological Salvage Project. She investigated sites in Texas which were about to be disrupted or destroyed by highway or reservoir construction in the 1960s. For example, the National Park Service supported her work at prehistoric sites in Cooke County, before they were flooded to create Hubert H. Moss Lake in 1966. In 1965, she directed the Texas Archeological Society's fourth annual field school. She spoke at the annual meeting of the Society for Historical Archaeology, held in Williamsburg in 1968. In the 1970s, she led an excavation at Fort Richardson in Jacksboro, Texas. She was also chief field archaeologist at Fort Griffin in Shackelford County.

By 1980, Lorrain was a nurse based in Ava, Missouri.

== Publications ==
- "A Cache of Blades from Carrollton, Texas" (1963)
- Bonfire Shelter: A Stratified Bison Kill Site, Val Verde County, Texas (1965, with David S. Dibble)
- "Bonfire Shelter Fauna" (1966)
- "Bone and Shell Artifacts" and "Animal Remains" (1967)
- "The Lower Rockwall Site, Rockwall County, Texas" (1968, with Norma Hoffrichter)
- "An Archaeologist's Guide to Nineteenth Century American Glass" (1968)
- "Archeological Excavations in Northwestern Crockett County, Texas, 1966-1967" (1968)
- "Archaeological Excavations in the Fish Creek Reservoir" (1969)

== Personal life ==
Hart married Paul Henry Lorrain in 1949. They had three children and divorced in 1977. She died in 2011, at the age of 83, in Alpine, Texas.
