= Brewster Apartments =

Condominium building in Chicago, Illinois

Coordinates: 41.9331°N 87.6416°W

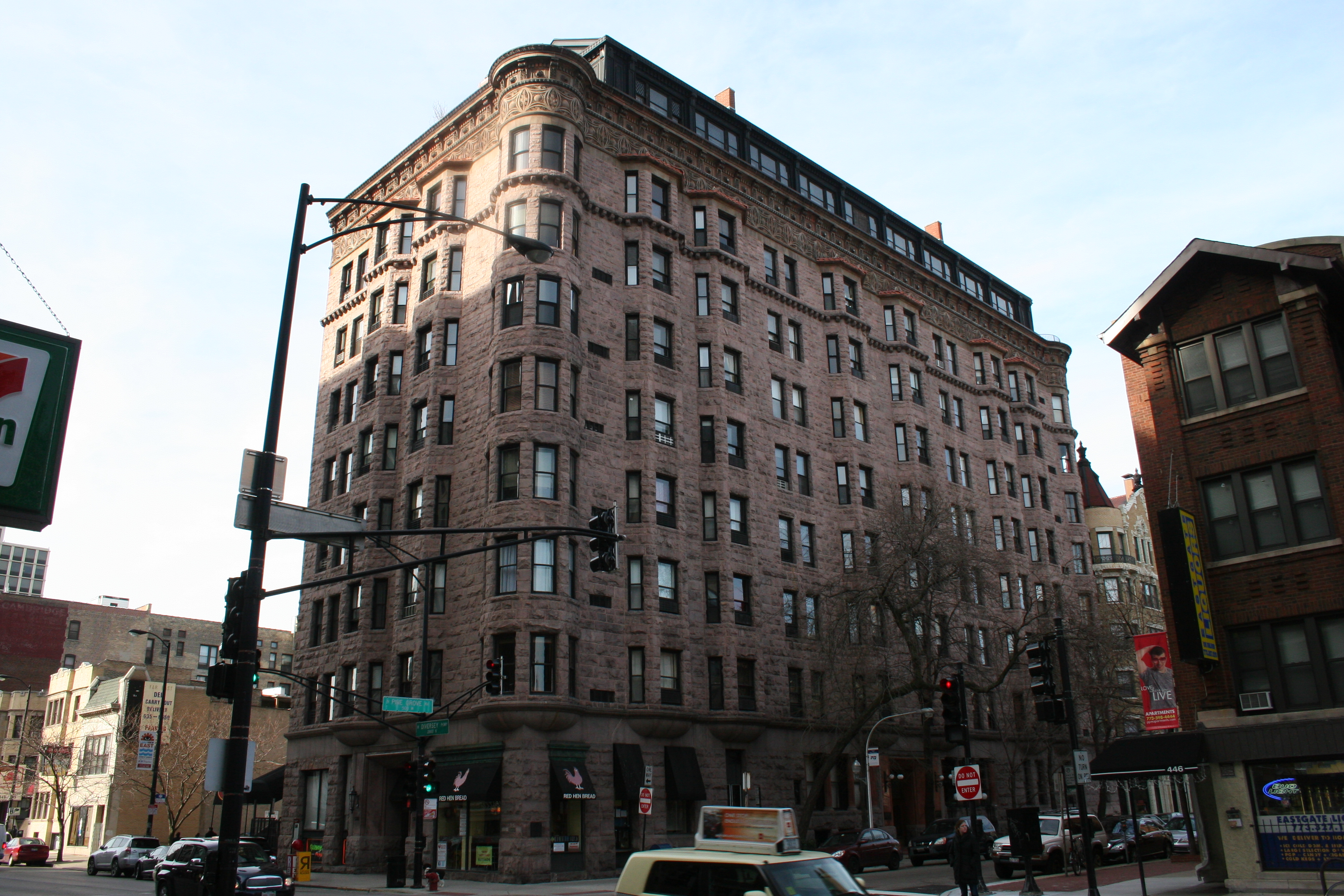

General information
- Status: Completed
- Type: Residential building
- Architectural style: Romanesque Revival
- Location: 2800 N Pine Grove Ave; Chicago, Illinois, 60657
- Construction started: 1893
- Completed: 1896

Technical details
- Floor count: 8
- Lifts/elevators: 3

Design and construction
- Architect: Enock Hill Turnock
- Developer: Bjoerne Edwards

Chicago Landmark
- Designated: October 6, 1982

The Brewster Apartments (originally known as Lincoln Park Palace) is a residential building in the Lake View neighborhood of Chicago.

Located at Diversey and Pine Grove (originally Park), it was designed by architect Enock Hill Turnock for Norwegian-born Bjoerne Edwards, publisher of American Contractor, with construction started in 1893 and completed in 1896. Edwards would die from an eighth-floor fall at the construction site before the project was completed.

The Romanesque Revival building was designated a Chicago Landmark on October 6, 1982.

== Architecture ==
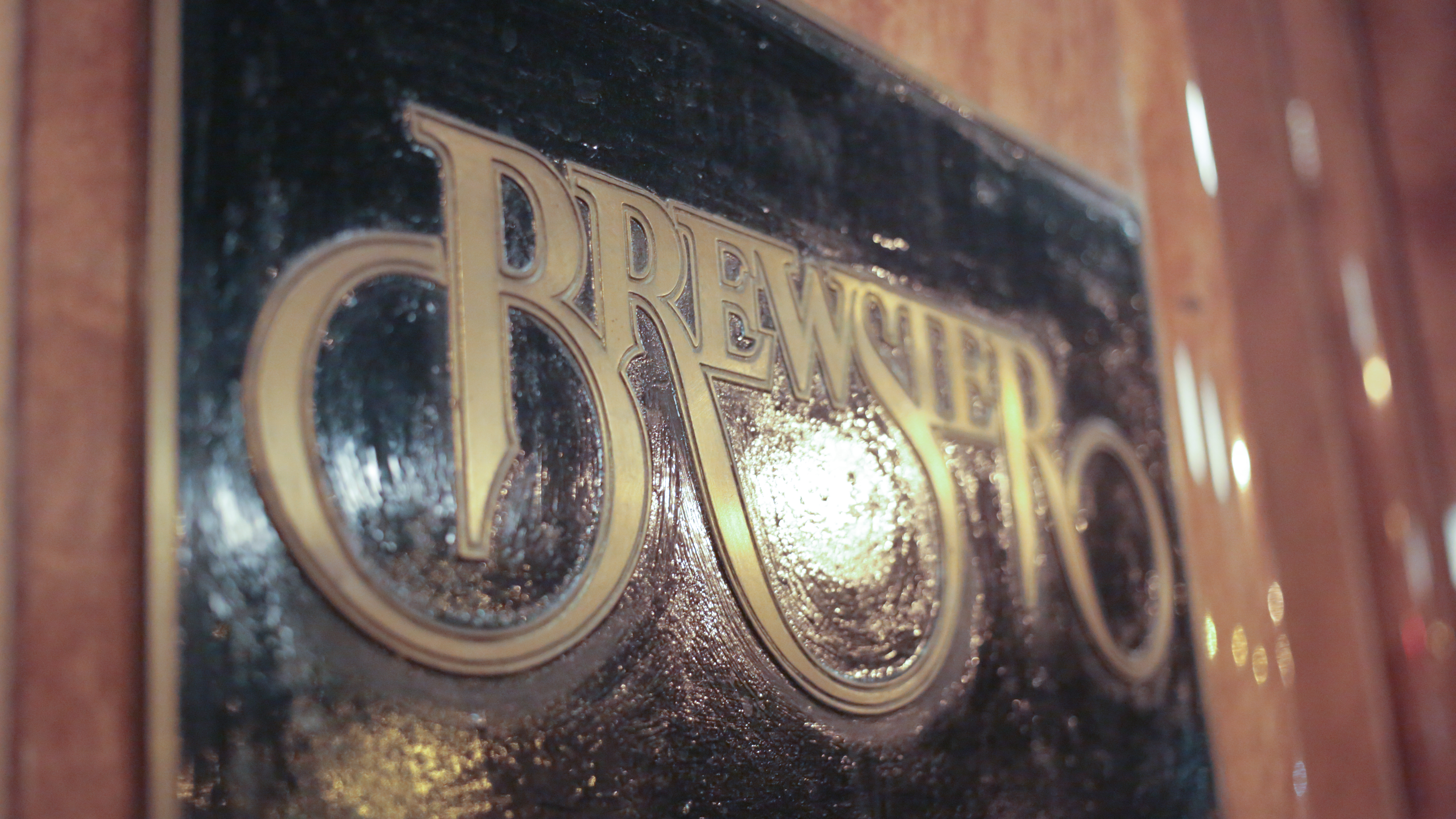
A sign at the building's entrance

The building features a stone exterior of pink jasper and employs steel skeleton-frame construction, which enabled the advent of skyscrapers at the end of the 19th century. The most prominent building feature is a full-height atrium with open cast iron stairways, bridge walkways paved with glass blocks, and a massive skylight.

== In popular culture ==
The Brewster Apartments has served as a set location for the movies Running Scared, Child’s Play and Hoodlum.

== Notable residents ==
Illinois Governor John Peter Altgeld lived in the building in 1897 after leaving the governorship.

Legend has it that Charlie Chaplin lived in the building in 1915–16 while employed by Chicago's Essanay Studios, and the penthouse owners have sworn by this tale of early film history, but historians say that Chaplin only lived in Chicago for three weeks, and slept on “Broncho Billy” Anderson's couch instead of getting himself an apartment — at the time, he was known for being far too tight with money to rent a place as pricey as the penthouse was.

== See also ==
- List of Chicago Landmarks
