= Beardsley Avenue Historic District =

Historic district in Indiana, United States

- U.S. National Register of Historic Places
- U.S. Historic district
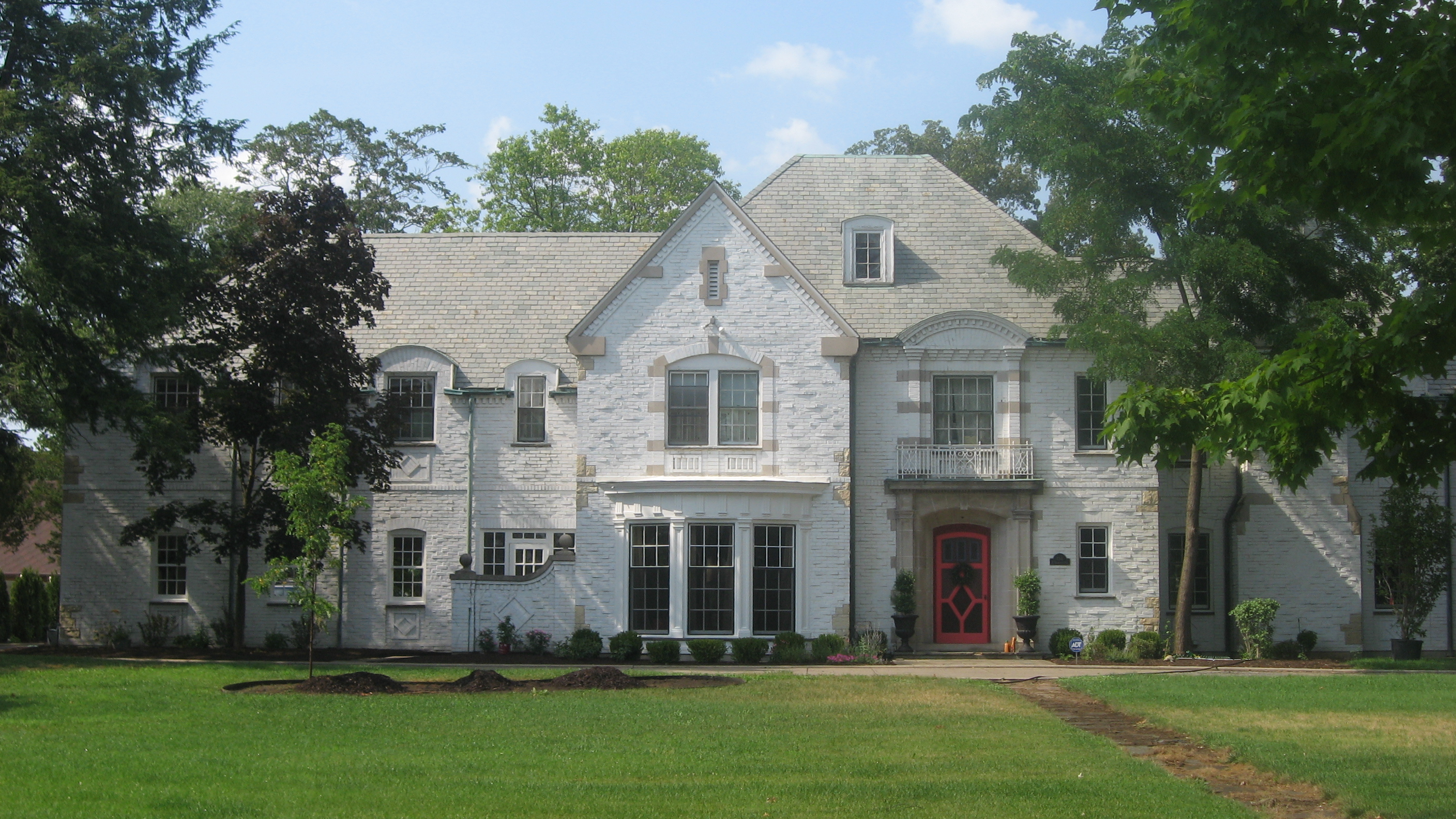
- Best House on Beardsley Avenue, July 2012

- Location within Indiana Location within the United States
- Location: 405 W to 441 E Beardsley Ave., 700 blk N. Riverside; Island Park, Elkhart, Indiana
- Coordinates: 41°41′32″N 85°58′31″W
- Area: 52 acres (21 ha)
- Built: 1848
- Architect: Tornock, Enoch Hill; Moore, William S. et al.
- Architectural style: Prairie School, Beaux Arts, et al.
- NRHP reference No.: 03000979
- Added to NRHP: September 28, 2003

Beardsley Avenue Historic District is a national historic district located at Elkhart, Indiana. The district encompasses 41 contributing buildings, 3 contributing sites, 2 contributing structures, and 2 contributing objects in a predominantly residential section of Elkhart. It was developed after 1848, and includes residences in a number of architectural styles including Prairie School and Beaux Arts. Located in the district are the separately listed Dr. Havilah Beardsley House and Ruthmere Mansion. Other notable contributing resources are Island Park, Beardsley Park, the Main Street Memorial Bridge, St. Paul's Methodist Church, and the Best House.

It was added to the National Register of Historic Places in 2003.
