= Morehous Residential Historic District =

Historic district in Indiana, United States

- U.S. National Register of Historic Places
- U.S. Historic district
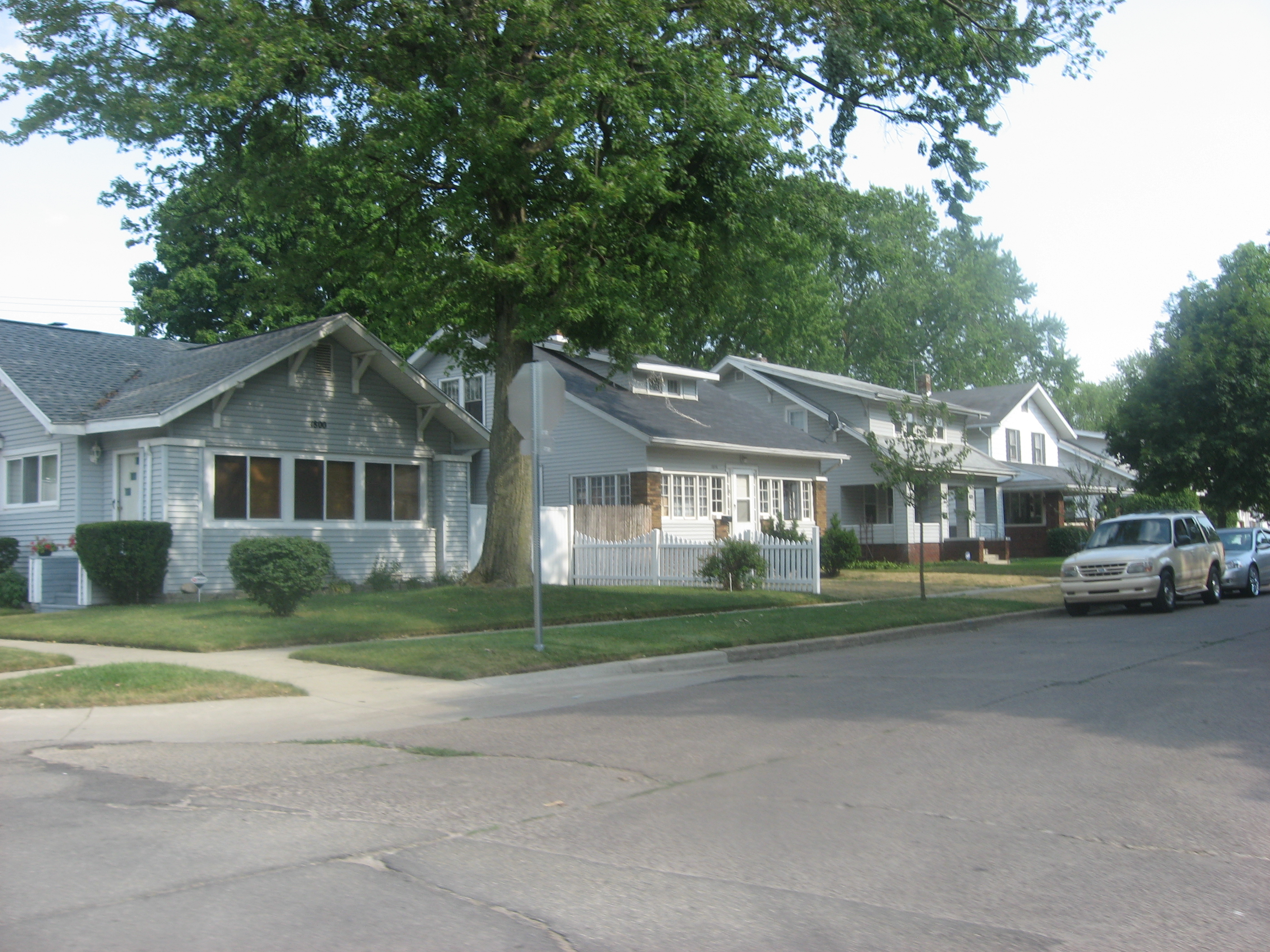
- Stevens Avenue in Morehous, July 2012

- Location within Indiana Location within the United States
- Location: Roughly bounded by E. Indiana, Morehouse, E. Hubbard, and the western side of Frances Aves., Elkhart, Indiana
- Coordinates: 41°40′16″N 85°57′43″W
- Area: 36 acres (15 ha)
- Architect: A.H. Ellwood & Sons; Sears, Roebuck & Co.
- Architectural style: Colonial Revival, Prairie School, Bungalow/craftsman
- NRHP reference No.: 11000706
- Added to NRHP: September 16, 2011

Morehous Residential Historic District is a national historic district located at Elkhart, Indiana. The district encompasses 110 contributing buildings in a predominantly residential section of Elkhart. It was developed between about 1910 and 1950, and includes notable examples of Colonial Revival, Prairie School, and Bungalow / American Craftsman style architecture. Notable buildings include the Roosevelt School (1921) and Simpson Memorial Methodist Church (1923).

It was added to the National Register of Historic Places in 2011.
