= Stephanhöuser Saxophones =

Distributed by the Elkhart, Indiana-based Gemstone Musical Instruments, Stephanhouser creates alto, tenor, soprano, and baritone saxophones for musicians at all levels, from student to professional. Stephanhöuser received three United States patents in less than five years of operation. The Stephanhouser innovations include the ScrewLess pin design, which eliminates pivot screws in post rods and enhances instrument durability, a procedure for creating a saxophone bow out of a single piece of brass for a more resonant sound, and a more precise octave key design. The Stephanhouser brand was created and developed by Dane Scott Stephens of Castroville, Texas in 2001.

Jazz saxophonist Shawn "Thunder" Wallace plays Stephanhouser instruments.
