= Young Women's Christian Association (Elkhart, Indiana) =

- U.S. National Register of Historic Places
- U.S. Historic district – Contributing property
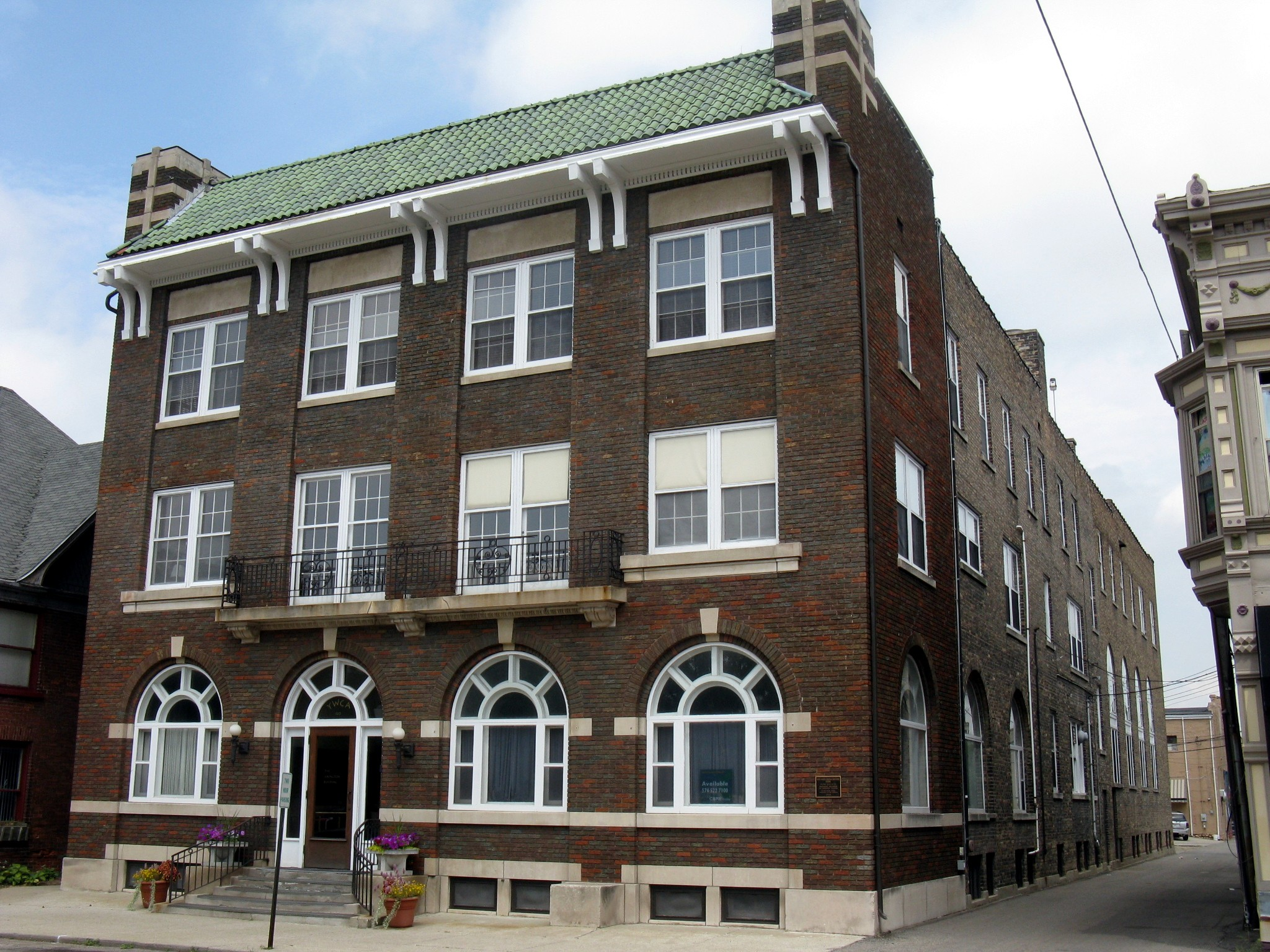
- Young Women's Christian Association, July 2010

- Location within Indiana Location within the United States
- Location: 120 W. Lexington Ave., Elkhart, Indiana
- Coordinates: 41°41′11″N 85°58′26″W
- Area: less than one acre
- Built: 1919
- Architect: Turnock, Enoch Hill
- Architectural style: Bungalow/craftsman
- NRHP reference No.: 91000257
- Added to NRHP: March 21, 1991

Young Women's Christian Association, also known as the Elkhart Y.W.C.A. and Lexington House, is a historic YWCA located at Elkhart, Indiana. It was built in 1919, and is a three-story, brick building on a raised basement and Bungalow / American Craftsman style design elements. It measures approximately 40 feet wide and 150 feet deep. It has a flat roof and arched openings on the first floor.

It was added to the National Register of Historic Places in 1991. It is located in the Elkhart Downtown Commercial Historic District.
