= State Street–Division Street Historic District =

Historic district in Indiana, United States

- U.S. National Register of Historic Places
- U.S. Historic district
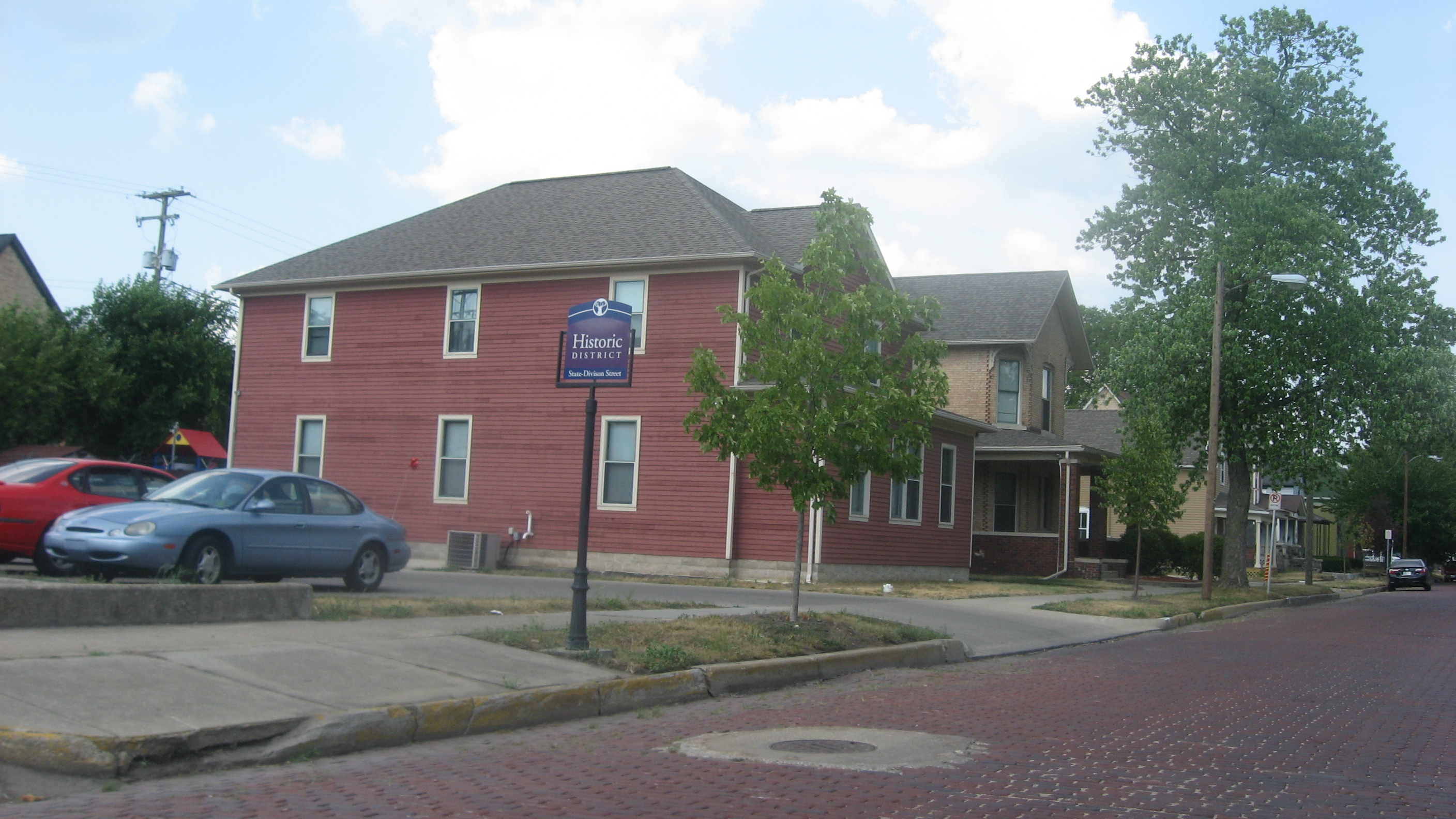
- State Street in Elkhart, July 2012

- Location within Indiana Location within the United States
- Location: Roughly both sides of State and Division Sts. between Main and Monroe, Elkhart, Indiana
- Coordinates: 41°40′58″N 85°57′59″W
- Area: 36.2 acres (14.6 ha)
- Architect: Turnock, E. Hill
- Architectural style: Italianate, Queen Anne
- NRHP reference No.: 99000255
- Added to NRHP: February 26, 1999

State Street–Division Street Historic District is a national historic district located at Elkhart, Indiana. The district encompasses 109 contributing buildings and two contributing structures in a predominantly residential section of Elkhart. It was developed between about 1868 and 1930, and includes notable examples of Italianate and Queen Anne-style architecture.

It was added to the National Register of Historic Places in 1999.
