= Ric Flauding =

American songwriter

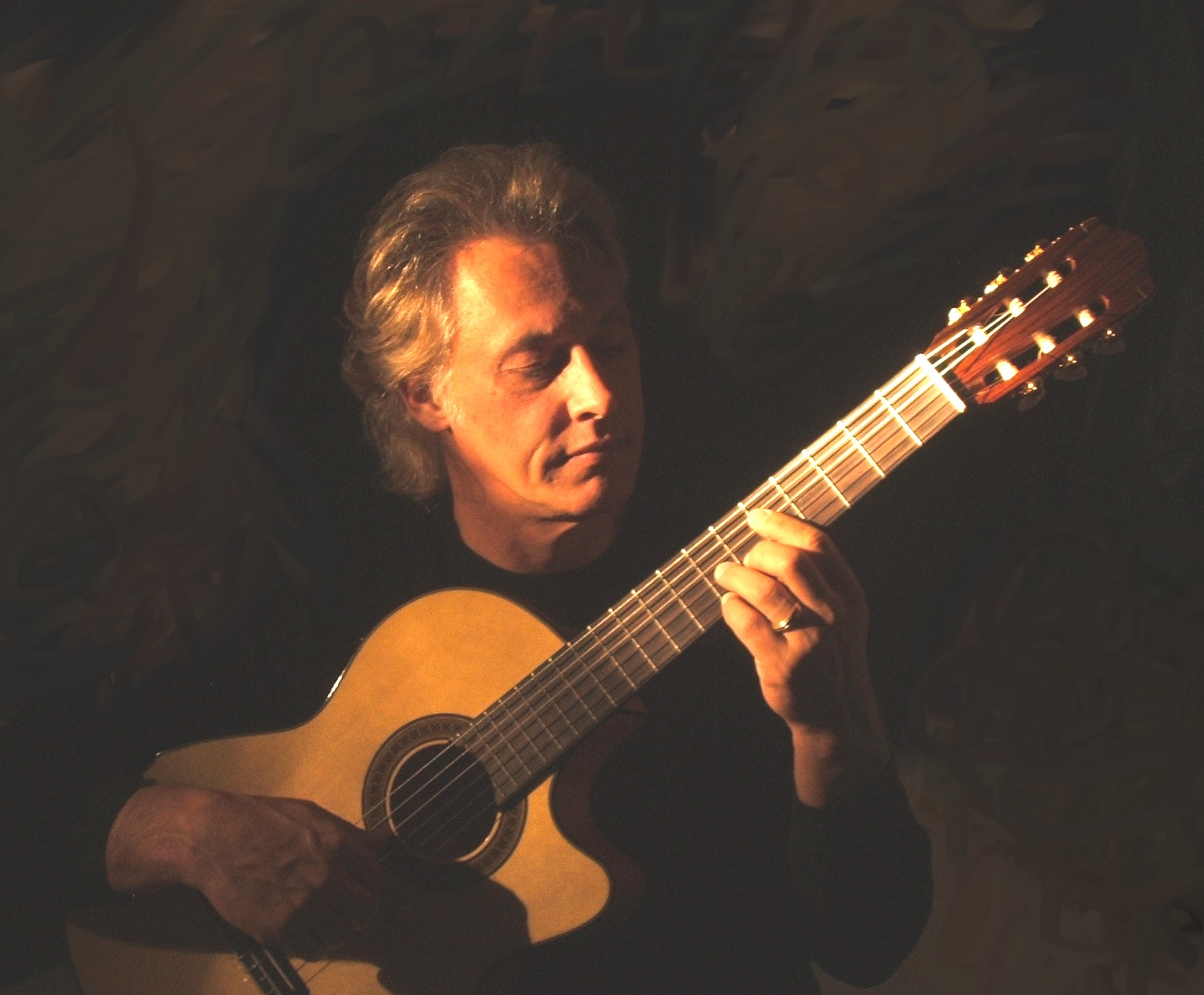
- Ric Flauding in 2005

Background information
- Born: Richard Gordon Flauding; February 2, 1954; Elkhart, Indiana, U.S.
- Died: July 26, 2021
- Genres: Smooth jazz, pop
- Occupations: Musician, composer
- Instrument: Guitar
- Years active: 1988–2021

Richard Gordon Flauding (February 2, 1954 – July 26, 2021) was an American arranger, composer, songwriter, and classically trained guitarist who has recorded several contemporary jazz and pop music albums and received an ASCAP Plus Award. His commissions include arrangements for guitar and orchestra, jazz ensembles, big band, contemporary jazz instrumentals, as well as choral and symphony productions. He has written, arranged, and recorded in many styles, including jazz and classical, and conducts professional and amateur jazz ensembles.

== Biography ==
=== Early recordings and studio work ===
Flauding began his recording and performance career while still in high school in Southern California. His first professional gigs were as lead guitarist and arranger for the band, Group Effort, formed by Ric and an older brother. With a full-time manager, the band performed in venues in Los Angeles and Orange County, California, during the late 1960s and early ’70s. He began formal musical studies at age eleven, learning to play trumpet in school, but quickly transitioned to guitar and studied privately with Barney Kessel and Horace Hatchett, classical guitar with Ted McKown, and flamenco performance with Ricardo de Escobal. Over the next ten years Flauding developed his knowledge of composition and music theory and immersed himself in the academic side of the art with Albert Harris, Bryant McKernan, John Shaffer Smith, and others.

In addition to an active performance schedule in the late-1970s and early 1980s, Flauding worked as a session guitarist and producer, taking part in recording sessions with some of the country's top bands and jazz ensembles. As an arranger and producer he participated in recording projects with artists such as David Benoit, John Patitucci, Eric Marienthal, Brandon Fields, Russell Ferrante, Wayne Bergeron and other well-known jazz artists and studio musicians. He performed with popular jazz, pop, and flamenco artists, including Bob James, Richard Elliot, Rick Braun and Michel Camilo. While on the staff of Yale Video Productions in Anaheim, California, Flauding connected with sound engineer John Fischer, which led to his first important recording contract and the release of his New Age Jazz album, "Refuge," for Spindletop Records. Over the next five years he recorded with other labels before forming his own private label, Flauding Music.

Flauding's second album, Letters, featured performances by popular jazz artists Novi Novog on viola, Emil Palame and Russell Ferrante on piano, Freddie Washington on bass, and Sam Riney on saxophone. The album was produced by the renowned jazz guitarist and record producer Paul Brown and became a pre-nomination Grammy candidate. During the same period Flauding completed the UCLA Film Scoring Program where he won awards for motion picture and commercial scoring. His contemporary jazz, new age, and cinematic compositions were recognized for their originality by Billboard magazine, the American Song Festival, and the American Society for Composers, Authors, and Publishers (ASCAP).

=== Workshops, festivals and academics ===
Flauding has taught music theory and composition along with courses on music technology and guitar and keyboard performance for Biola University in La Mirada, California; the College of the Desert in Palm Desert, Arizona; Southwestern Baptist Theological Seminary in Fort Worth, Texas; and Weatherford College, also in Texas. In addition he has tutored theory and composition students for the Boston-based Berklee College of Music, along with online students in several states and countries around the world.

In 2016 Flauding participated as conductor and clinician for jazz workshops and related public concerts at the University of North Dakota (2016 Spring Workshop) and Rock Valley College in Rockford, Illinois, (the 33rd Annual Jazz Festival) leading jazz workshops, conducting, and performing on guitar for the 2016 Spring Concert. In February 2016 Flauding took part as performer, conductor, and panelist at the annual Lone Star Guitar Festival in Weatherford, Texas. He served as adjudicator and clinician for the Texas Bandmasters Association in 2015 and as assistant director for the Weatherford College Jazz Band at the 2016 Jazz Festival at the University of Texas at Arlington.

Ric Flauding has produced compositions and arrangements for groups including the London Symphony and the London Boychoir,; the Fort Worth Symphony,; the Plano Symphony Orchestra: (December 18, 2016), in which his arrangement of the song "Sleigh Ride" was the featured Finale of the "Home for the Holidays" concerts; and the Juarez, Mexico, Symphony Orchestras, and arrangements commissioned by jazz, pop, and New Age instrumentalists. "All Creatures" arranged for Mack Goldsbury His song, "For Dave Mustaine," commemorates a friendship with the leader and lead guitarist of the metal band, Megadeth. Flauding's original recordings have charted Commercial and Digital Radio and have been featured in numerous television and film productions. Concert works, such as his "Viola Sonata (Passacaglia & Fugue)," were premiered in Europe. In summer 2016 he began work on a new suite for guitar and orchestra in three movements.

Approximately 150 jazz, contemporary jazz band, and popular recordings by Ric Flauding are featured on iTunes, CD Baby, Amazon music, eMusic.com, Slacker music service, TradeBit.com, and Microsoft digital music stores, among others. His recordings have charted Digital Radio for iTunes and Rhapsody online music service and R&R for MacJazz New Horizons and the Gavin Report charting service. Flauding's arrangements have been featured on the Oprah Winfrey Show and in national commercials. In addition he has composed, arranged, orchestrated for recording artists and record labels, ranging from Metropolitan Opera bass-baritone soloist Jeffrey Wells, performing with the Fort Worth Symphony, to contemporary Christian artists Larnelle Harris, David Meece, and Keith Green.

=== Compositions and publications ===
Since moving his home and recording studio to Texas in 2008, Flauding has composed and arranged for bands, orchestras, and ensembles. He has released singles recorded in Texas, Nashville, and Los Angeles, and produced several new arrangements for what he describes as "little big band." In 2013 Flauding published the book Guitar Tips written for contemporary church worship leaders, currently available from Barnes & Noble, Amazon, and as an eBook from Praise Charts, Kobo Books, and others. His published guitar music has been distributed by Columbia Pictures Publications.

Flauding's "Guitar Etude" (an excerpt from the composition "Moonlit") was selected by the Texas Jazz Educators Association for the Texas All-State Competition in 2015. Two of his compositions and arrangements were performed in spring 2016 by symphony orchestras in Juarez, Mexico, and Laredo, Texas, featuring the American jazz saxophonist Mack Goldsbury. Goldsbury also used Flauding's jazz composition, "Tacos," scored for little big band, in a December 2015 jazz workshop in Berlin, Germany. More than a hundred of Flauding's composition and arrangements for band and jazz ensemble are featured in the form of sheet music and performance scores on the J.W. Pepper & Son and Sheet Music Plus online music distribution services.

=== Concert commissions ===
- "Passacaglia & Fugue" for Viola & Piano, preview premiere by Peter Odegard at University of California, Irvine, with formal premiere by Robert Becker
- Golden West College (Huntington Beach, California) Arrangements for Choir & Orchestra.
- NRG! Flute Duo (Multiple arrangements for flute artists Tina Beaton and Sherry Finzer)
- "The Hour of Power" Television Program and the Crystal Cathedral in Garden Grove, California (including numerous arrangements for choir and orchestra)

=== Composer and conductor ===
- Lovers Lane Jazz Band, sponsored by Lovers Lane UMC, Dallas, Texas (2015 to Present)
- University of North Dakota 2016 Spring Workshop
- Rock Valley College, Rockford, Illinois, Jazz Workshop & Spring Concert
- University of California, Irvine Concert Series

== Personal life ==
Flauding was born in Elkhart, Indiana. He died on July 26, 2021.

== Discography ==
- Refuge (Spindletop, 1988)
- Letters (Spindletop, 1990)
- Love Was Different Then (Trompe l'Oreille, 1993)
- A Peaceful Easy Christmas (BCI, 2001)
- Escape (Flauding, 2003)
- Hymns and Praise (Flauding, 2003)
- Jazz Passages (Flauding, 2003)
- Orchestral Cinematic Compositions (Flaudin, 2005)
- Caleo (Flauding, 2006)
- Hymns & Christmas (Flauding, 2007)
- The Journey Collection with The Suite for Guitar (Flauding, 2017)
