= Emmanuel C. Bickel House =

Historic house in Indiana, United States

- U.S. National Register of Historic Places
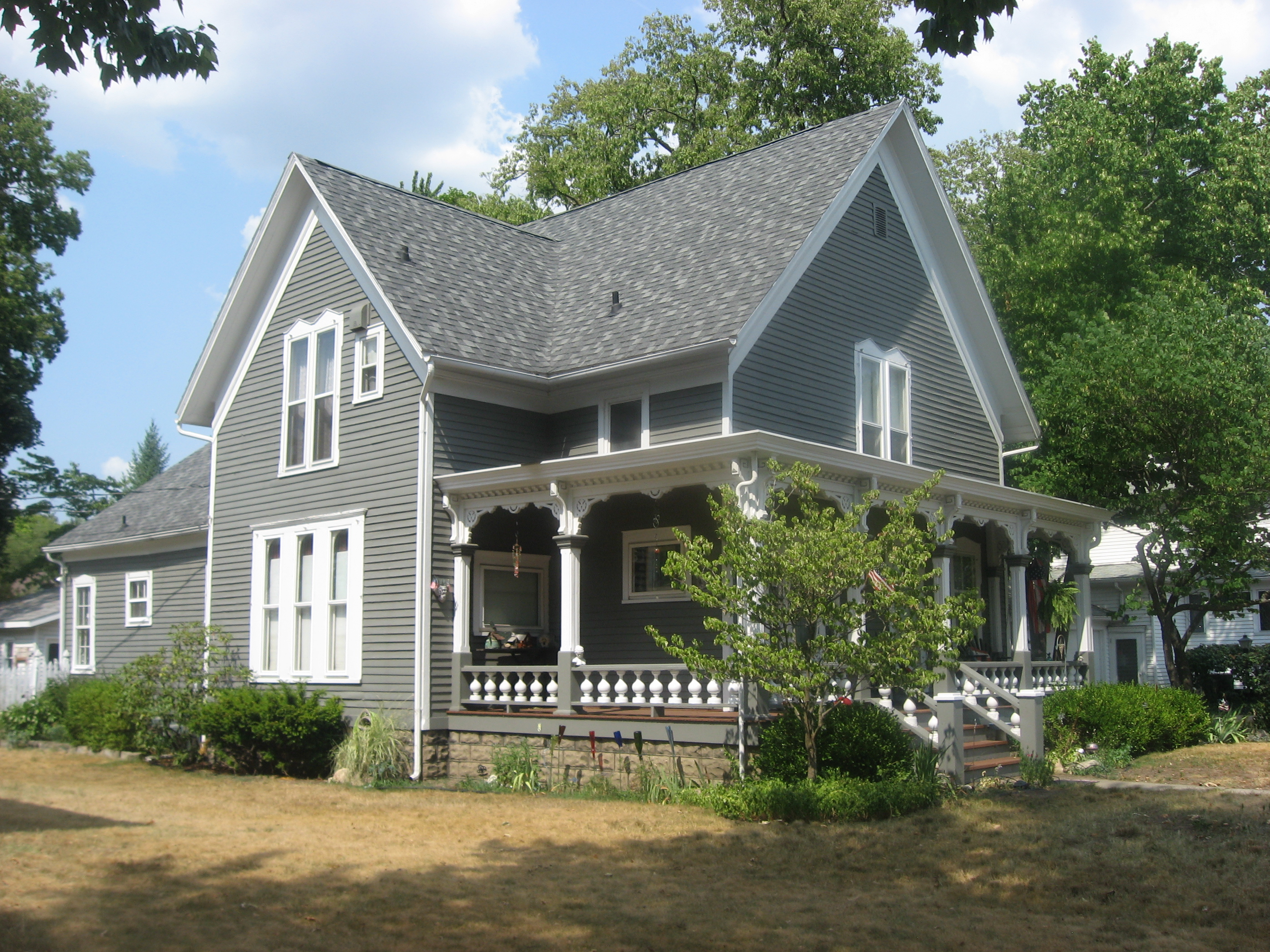
- Emmanuel C. Bickel House, July 2012

- Location within Indiana Location within the United States
- Location: 614 Bower St., Elkhart, Indiana
- Coordinates: 41°41′20″N 85°59′3″W
- Area: 0.1 acres (0.040 ha)
- Built: c. 1870
- Architectural style: Carpenter gothic
- NRHP reference No.: 79000014
- Added to NRHP: November 14, 1979

Emmanuel C. Bickel House is a historic home located at Elkhart, Indiana. It was built about 1870, and is a two-story, "T"-plan, Carpenter Gothic style balloon frame dwelling. It features a wraparound porch with a flat roof, decorative scrollwork, and eight bracketed square columns.

It was added to the National Register of Historic Places in 1979.
