= WFRN-FM =

Radio station in Elkhart, Indiana

- Elkhart, Indiana; United States
- Frequency: 104.7 MHz
- Branding: "Family Friendly WFRN"

Programming
- Format: Contemporary Christian music

Ownership
- Owner: Progressive Broadcasting System, Inc.
- Sister stations: WCMR

History
- First air date: June 10, 1963
- Former call signs: WCMR-FM (1963–1964); WXAX (1964–1979); WFRN (1979–1993)

Technical information
- Licensing authority: FCC
- Facility ID: 53639
- Class: B
- ERP: 50,000 watts
- HAAT: 140 meters (460 ft)
- Transmitter coordinates: 41°37′18.2″N 85°57′37″W

Links
- Public license information: Public file; LMS
- Webcast: Listen live
- Website: wfrn.com

WFRN-FM (104.7 FM) is a radio station licensed to Elkhart, Indiana, United States. The station airs a format consisting of Contemporary Christian music as well as some Christian talk and teaching and is owned by Progressive Broadcasting System.

== History ==
The station began broadcasting June 10, 1963, as WCMR-FM. On February 1, 1964, its call sign was changed to WXAX.

The station became WFRN on March 26, 1979, the culmination of the dream of Ed Moore for a Contemporary Christian music station. The station was an extension of the AM sister station which has been on the air since 1956 providing nationally recognized Christian programming.

WFRN, along with its sister stations WFRR and WFRI and a network of repeater stations, covers over 30 counties throughout the northern half of Indiana and southern Michigan.

On July 6, 1993, the AM station changed its call sign from WCMR to WFRN. It switched back to WCMR in 2009. WCMR offers a southern gospel music format.

A third station, WGNC-FM "God and Country" 88.5 FM, was added to the WFRN family in January 2013. WGNC, licensed to Constantine, Michigan, and broadcasting with 15,000 watts of power, offers a format of "family-friendly" country music.

== Network ==
The 1995 addition of the 93.7 frequency in Kokomo, Indiana, began the building of a network of stations and repeaters that continued through 2008, greatly increasing the station's coverage across northern Indiana and southern Michigan. Most of this growth occurred since May 2003 with the assistance of a group called Friends of Christian Radio.

=== Stations ===
Call sign	Frequency	City of license	FID	ERP (W)	HAAT	Class	Transmitter coordinates	FCC info
WFRR	93.7 FM	Walton, Indiana	11041	6,000	100 m (330 ft)	A	40°43′31.1″N 86°10′32.9″W	LMS
WFRI	100.1 FM	Winamac, Indiana	53645	6,000	100 m (330 ft)	A	41°2′21.1″N 86°30′55″W	LMS

=== Translators ===
Broadcast translators for WFRN-FM
Call sign	Frequency	City of license	FID	ERP (W)	HAAT	Class	Transmitter coordinates	FCC info
W266BF	101.1 FM	South Bend, Indiana	147678	67	87 m (285 ft)	D	41°36′59.2″N 86°11′44″W	LMS
W243AJ	96.5 FM	Mishawaka, Indiana	78392	250	54.4 m (178 ft)	D	41°41′53.2″N 86°9′25″W	LMS
W258BD	99.5 FM	Ligonier, Indiana	147695	120	28.4 m (93 ft)	D	41°27′49.1″N 85°35′12.9″W	LMS

Broadcast translator for WFRR
Call sign	Frequency	City of license	FID	ERP (W)	HAAT	Class	Transmitter coordinates	FCC info
W272CZ	102.3 FM	Sheridan, Indiana	145121	55	54 m (177 ft)	D	40°9′0.1″N 86°20′16″W	LMS
