= Enock Hill Turnock =

English-born American architect

- Born: February 27, 1857; London, UK
- Died: July 8, 1926 (aged 69); Fort Wayne, Indiana, US
- Occupation: Architect
- Buildings: Brewster Apartments, Chicago, Illinois; Ruthmere Mansion, Elkhart, Indiana; Havilah Beardsley Memorial, Elkhart, Indiana.

Enock Hill Turnock (1857–1926), generally known as E. Hill Turnock, was an American architect who worked in the Chicago area from 1882 until 1907, and then in Elkhart, Indiana, from 1907 until his death in 1926.

== Family background ==
Turnock was born February 27, 1857, in London, England, to Richard and Elizabeth (Hill) Turnock. His father made several trips to the United States before deciding to move his family there in 1871. After visiting with friends and relatives following their arrival in New York City, the family settled in Elkhart, Indiana, in 1872.

Turnock's daughter-in-law, Mrs. E.H. Turnock Jr., explained that the unusual spelling of his first name was intended to distinguish him from a previous son named Enoch who had died in infancy. His parents liked the name and wanted to use it again, but did not want to cause future confusion by having had two sons with the same name. They therefor changed the spelling, using a k instead of an h. Turnock listed his named professionally as E. Hill Turnock, but his brothers were known to call him "Nock.”

== Early career ==
As a young man in Elkhart, Indiana, Turnock was employed by the Lakeshore Railroad, where he worked his way up to head pattern maker. The 1880 U.S. census listed his occupation as "carpenter." Turnock soon left Elkhart for Chicago where he pursued architectural studies at the Art Institute of Chicago and began working for noted Chicago architect William Le Baron Jenney around 1882. In 1890, Turnock established his own independent architectural practice. He continued to work in Chicago until 1907, when he returned permanently to Elkhart.

== Later years ==
In Elkhart, Turnock found the success that had eluded him in Chicago. His civic and commercial work there included the Elkhart City Hall, Elkhart General Hospital, Elkhart High School, Elkhart Masonic Temple, Elkhart Public Library, the Water Company building, the YWCA building, the Christian Science Church, a Presbyterian Church, and the Rice Cemetery office. He also designed a number of residences during this period, the most notable being the home of A.R. Beardsley, known as Ruthmere. Turnock also designed the Beardsley Mausoleum in Grace Lawn Cemetery.

An list of structures attributed to Turnock in and around Elkhart can found at the Robert B. Beardsley Arts Reference Library at the Ruthmere Museum in Elkhart.

Turnock became a member of the American Institute of Architects in 1914 and was elected president of the Indiana Society of Architects in 1919. Following his retirement and shortly before his death in 1926, he was elected to AIA fellowship. He was a member of several clubs and societies, including the Tyrian and Royal Lodge of Masons, Christiana Country Club, Atherton Club, and the old Century Club.

Turnock suffered from kidney disease, for which spent approximately seven months in treatment at the Mayo Hospital in Rochester, Minnesota. He died from Kidney failure on July 8, 1926, soon after returning home.

== Work ==
Following is a list of notable properties created by Enoch Hill Turnock.

- Brewster Apartments, Chicago, Illinois. Formerly known as Lincoln Park Palace.

Built in 1893, this building was constructed with dark masonry polished Jasper walls that gave way to an airy interior distinguished by spacious cast-iron stairways, open elevator cages, glass blocks embedded in walkways and a massive skylight.

- Ruthmere Mansion, Elkhart, Indiana. Formerly Albert and Elizabeth Beardsley Residence.

Built in 1910, this three story mansion built in Beaux Art style is Elkhart's most prominent historical residence. Refurbished in the early 1970s, the Ruthmere Mansion is now open to the public as a museum home.

- Havilah Beardsley Memorial, Elkhart, Indiana.

Located a short distance from the former Beardsley Residence is a monument designed by E. Hill Turnock and dedicated to Havilah Beardsley, the area's first doctor, and the founder of the City of Elkhart. It was commissioned by his nephew A.R. Beardsley. Turnock's influence is easily recognized by the large stone flower bowls which border the monument.

== Influences ==
- William Le Baron Jenney
- Henry Hobson Richardson
- Louis Sullivan
- Daniel H. Burnham

These architects were among the most influential American architects in the later 19th and early 20th centuries.
