= WCMR (AM) =

Elkhart, Indiana; United States
- Frequency: 1270 kHz
- Branding: Solid Gospel 1270 & 105.3 FM

Programming
- Format: Southern gospel

Ownership
- Owner: Progressive Broadcasting System, Inc.
- Sister stations: WFRN-FM

History
- First air date: 1956
- Former call signs: WCMR (1956–1993); WFRN (1993–2008)

Technical information
- Licensing authority: FCC
- Facility ID: 53650
- Class: B
- Power: 5,000 watts day; 1,000 watts night
- Transmitter coordinates: 41°37′16.18″N 85°57′40″W
- Translator(s): 105.3 W287BL (Elkhart)

Links
- Public license information: Public file; LMS

WCMR (1270 AM) is a radio station licensed to Elkhart, Indiana, United States. The station is owned by Progressive Broadcasting System. WCMR airs a full-time southern gospel format, using Salem Radio Networks' "Solid Gospel" format.

== History ==
The station went on the air as WCMR in 1956. WCMR broadcast a country music format for many years. From July 5, 1993, until June 16, 2008, the station used the call sign WFRN, with Christian talk programming separate from sister WFRN-FM which focuses on contemporary Christian music.

Until the summer of 2012, WCMR utilized most of its weekday programming schedule for conservative talk as "Smart Talk 1270". "Smart Talk 1270" aired a variety of talk shows including; Bill Bennett, Dave Ramsey, and Hugh Hewitt.

== Translator ==
Broadcast translator for WCMR
Call sign	Frequency	City of license	FID	ERP (W)	HAAT	Class	Transmitter coordinates	FCC info
W287BL	105.3 FM	Elkhart, Indiana	150311	165	128.2 m (421 ft)	D	41°37′18.2″N 85°57′38″W	LMS
