= Rosa 'American Beauty' =

Rose cultivar

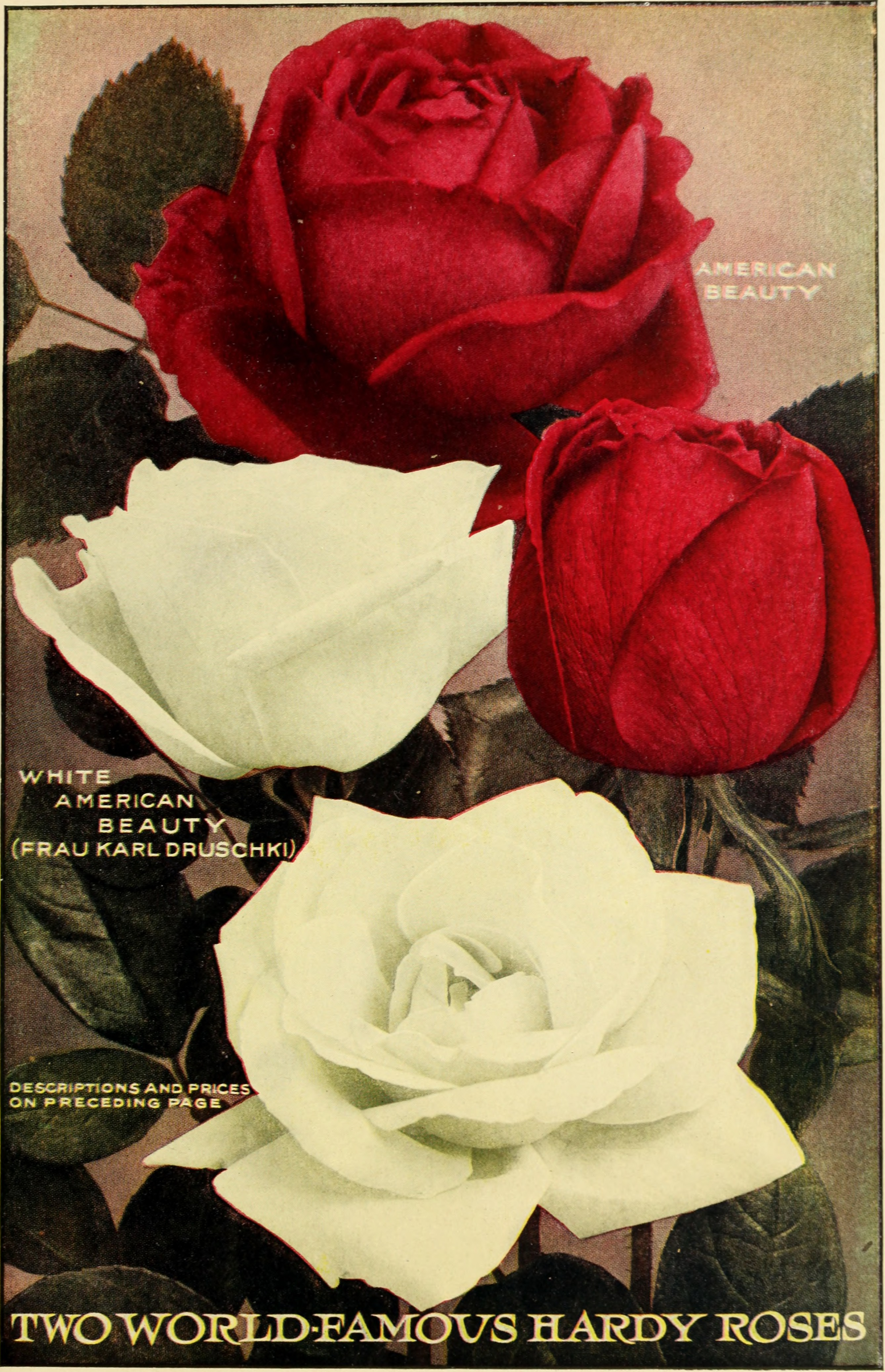
- The original cultivar (top), and a white variant (bottom)
- Hybrid parentage: Rosa hybrid
- Cultivar group: Hybrid Perpetual
- Cultivar: 'American Beauty'
- Marketing names: 'Mme Ferdinand Jamin'
- Origin: Henri Lédéchaux (France, 1875)

Rosa 'American Beauty' is a deep pink to crimson rose cultivar, bred by Henri Lédéchaux in France in 1875, and was originally named 'Madame Ferdinand Jamin'.

== Description ==
The hybrid perpetual has cup-shaped flowers with a brilliant crimson color and up to 50 petals, situated on long, stiff stems. The buds are thick and globular and open to strongly scented, hybrid tea-like flowers with a diameter of 11 cm. They appear in flushes over a long period, but according to the RHS Encyclopedia of Roses, only sparingly.

The height of the upright, vigorous shrub ranges between 90 and 200 centimetres (3.0 and 6.6 ft) at an average width of 90 to 125 centimetres (2.95 to 4.10 ft). 'American Beauty' has prickly shoots, dark green foliage and is winter hardy up to −29 °C (USDA zone 5), but is susceptible to the fungi diseases mildew, rust and black spot. It is well suited as a cut flower, and can be grown in greenhouses, in containers, or as a garden rose, planted solitary or in groups.

== History ==
In 1875, it was brought to the United States by George Valentine Nash. It was introduced as a new rose cultivar named 'American Beauty' by Bancroft and Field Bros in 1886, but quite soon identified as 'Madame Ferdinand Jamin'. In 1888, Bassett & Washburn first introduced the rose to other florists for purchase. It became a famous greenhouse variety and was the best-selling rose cultivar in the United States until the 1920s. Due to its high price per stem (at least two dollars per stem right from its launch in 1886) and its popularity, the cultivar was called the million-dollar rose. Its popularity remained focused on the United States, while it is only rarely cultivated in other countries.

== As a state symbol ==
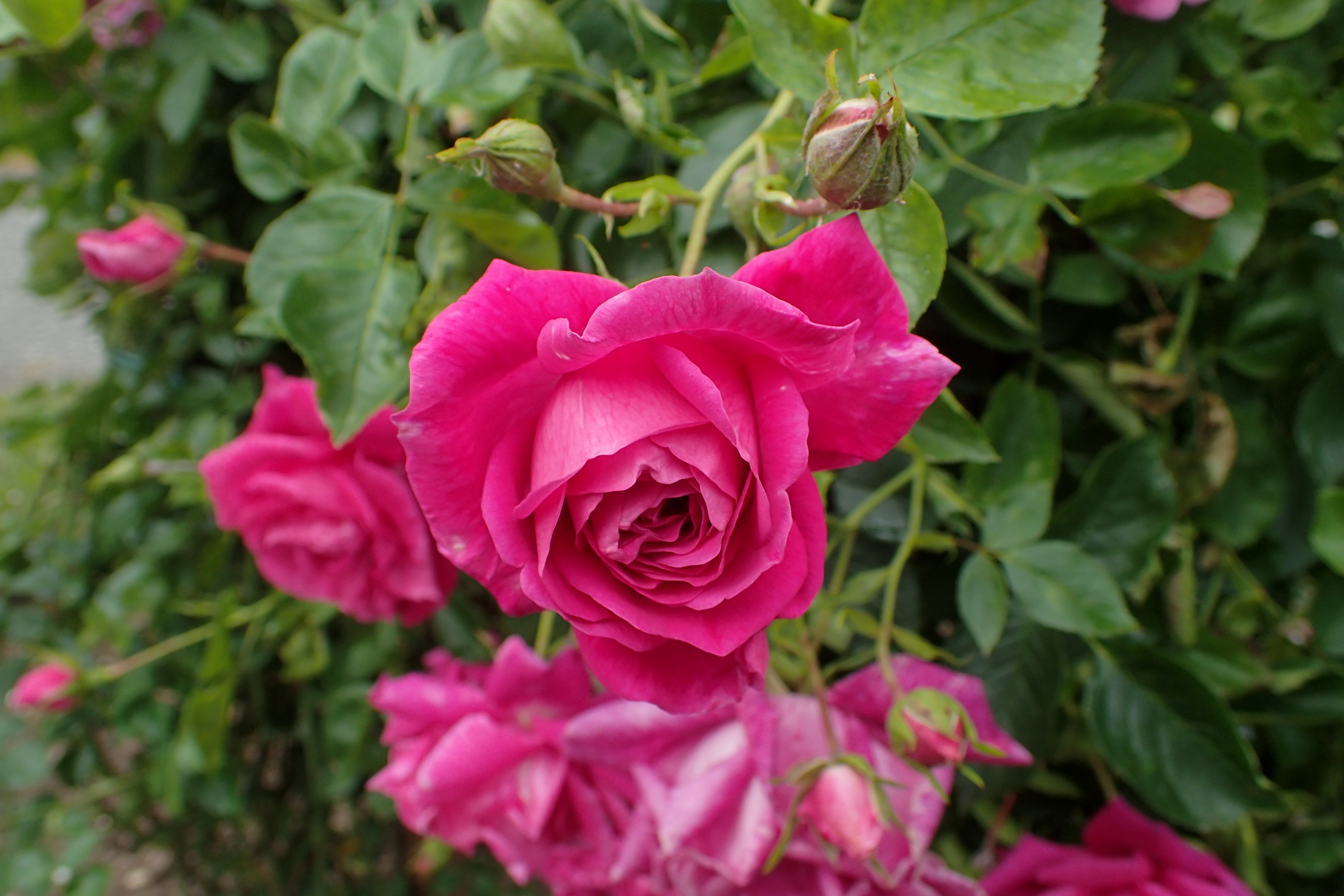
The climbing form of the rose

'American Beauty' is the official flower of Washington, D.C.
