= HCJB =

Ecuadorian Christian missionary radio station

Coordinates: 0.1133°S 78.3586°W

- Type: Private missionary broadcasting
- Country: Ecuador
- Founded: 1931
- Headquarters: Quito
- Owner: Reach Beyond - World Radio Missionary Fellowship, Inc.

HCJB, known as "The Voice of the Andes", was the first radio station with daily programming in Ecuador and the first Christian missionary radio station in the world. HCJB broadcasts nationwide on FM; in the past the station was known worldwide for its shortwave transmissions.

HCJB is owned and operated by the US missionary Reach Beyond, based in Colorado Springs, Colorado. The station was founded in 1931 by US missionaries Clarence W. Jones, Reuben Larson, and D. Stuart Clark. HCJB broadcasts on FM at 89.3 MHz in Pichincha, at 92.5 MHz in Manabí, at 96.1 MHz in Tungurahua and Cotopaxi, at 98.3 MHz in Esmeraldas and with separate programming on AM at 690 kHz. Broadcasts in Spanish and indigenous languages on 6.05 MHz (1 kW).

For decades, HCJB broadcast worldwide on powerful shortwave transmitters, reaching audiences in North America and Europe. In 2014 HCJB ended its high-powered international shortwave services.

== Programming ==
HCJB broadcasts Spanish-language missionary programming for Ecuador. The program is transmitted through a small chain of FM transmitters:

- Pichincha - FM 89.3 MHz
- Tungurahua y Cotopaxi - FM 96.1 MHz
- Esmeraldas - FM 98.3 MHz
- Manabí - FM 92.5 MHz

== History ==
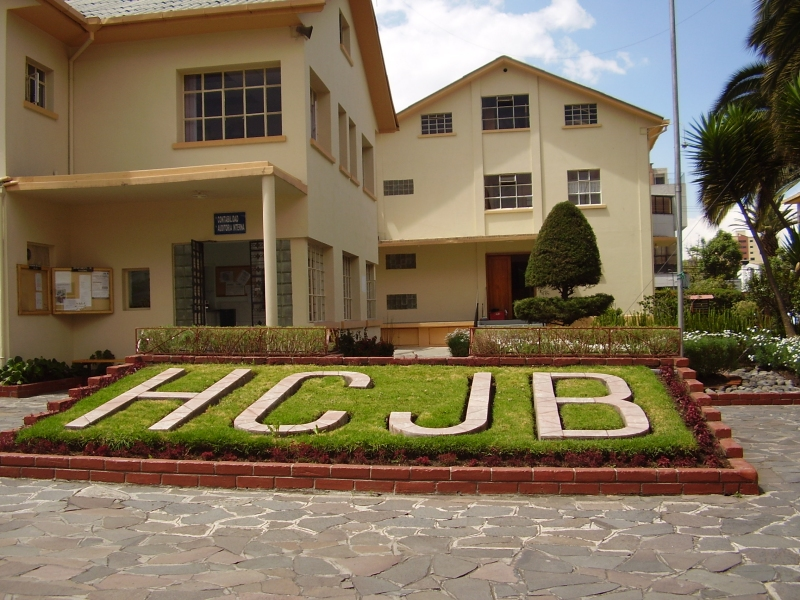
Former HCJB facility in Quito, Ecuador

Radio station HCJB started as the vision of Clarence Wesley Jones, a musician, graduate of Moody Bible Institute, and son of a Salvation Army minister. Following his graduation from Moody, Jones worked under evangelist Paul Rader and was part of the founding staff of the Chicago Gospel Tabernacle where Jones assisted in leading music, working with youth and overseeing Rader's weekly radio ministry called "WJBT" (Where Jesus Blesses Thousands) Impressed by the impact Rader's radio ministry had made, Jones felt called to establish missionary radio in Latin America. As a result, Jones traveled to Venezuela, Colombia, Panama and Cuba on a seven-week trip in 1928 looking for a suitable location for his envisioned radio station, but was unable to obtain the necessary government permits. Back in Chicago nearly two years later, Jones met Christian & Missionary Alliance (CMA) missionaries from Ecuador, Reuben and Grace Larson, John and Ruth Clark, and Paul and Bernice Young. These missionaries encouraged Jones to consider Ecuador as the place to start his missionary radio station.

As the first step in fulfilling his vision, Jones needed to obtain a contract of approval from the Ecuadorian government for setting up the radio station. Reuben Larson and D. Stuart Clark, along with Ecuadorian lawyer Luís Calisto, worked to procure the initial contract. On August 15, 1930, the Ecuadorian Congress approved a bill that granted Jones a 25-year contract to operate a radio station in the country.

As with all countries having a governing body over broadcast operations, the call letters HCJB were obtained through the government of Ecuador, beginning with the internationally allocated prefix for Ecuador's broadcast stations (HC). Station co-founders Jones and Larson advocated for, and were granted by the government, call letters that were an acronym indicative of the stations' agreed purpose. The result was Heralding Christ Jesus' Blessings. In Spanish (one of the original broadcast languages of the South American station) the call letters represent Hoy Cristo Jesús Bendice.

Jones incorporated the World Radio Missionary Fellowship, Inc. (WRMF) on March 9, 1931, as a non-profit entity and overseeing organization over HCJB. Jones was also the non-profit corporation's first president. The corporation's first officers were Adam Welty as treasurer, Ruth Churchill, secretary, and Lance Latham and his wife, Virginia, along with Howard Jones and Reuben Larson serving on the board of directors.

=== Starting HCJB in 1931 ===
HCJB's first broadcast on Christmas Day, 1931 had the potential of being heard by the six radio receivers capable of receiving the program that existed in the country at the time. The inaugural program was broadcast in English and Spanish from a studio in the Joneses' living room, powered by a 200-watt, table-top transmitter. The antenna used was a simple, single-wire antenna strung between two makeshift telephone poles. The broadcast lasted 30 minutes.

Initially, HCJB only broadcast programs in English and Spanish. In 1941, however, live programs were added in Russian, Swedish and Quichua. By 1944, the station had aired programming in 14 languages including live programs in Czech, Dutch, French and German. Programs in languages such as Arabic, Italian and Hebrew were recorded elsewhere and sent to Quito on large acetate-coated aluminium transcription discs.

In 1951, HCJB acquired 45 acres of land near the town of Pifo to construct transmission and antenna facilities.

In 1953, HCJB began broadcasting in German, targeting German-speaking communities in North and South America. Starting in the 1960s, the opportunity to gain a following in Central Europe as the "Voice of the Andes" was recognized and seized. By 1967, live programming would be added in Portuguese and Japanese.

In 1961 HCJB was licensed for a TV station, the first in Ecuador.

In 1990, a new 100 kW transmitter (HC-100) went into operation in Pifo. Like the 500 kW transmitter, it was designed and built by HCJB engineers from the USA. It operated only single-sideband with a carrier, so that it could be heard on AM radios. Additional HC-100 transmitters were built and put into use by the World Radio Missionary Fellowship, Inc. in Swaziland and Australia.

=== End of shortwave broadcasts ===
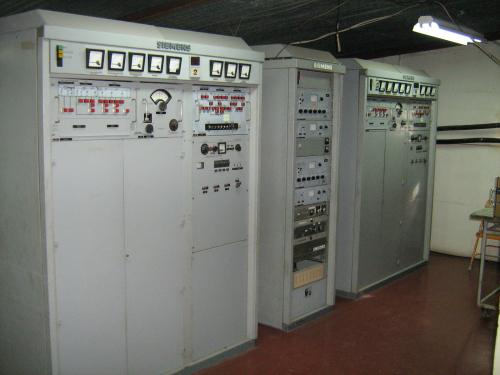
A former Siemens single-sideband transmitter at Radio Station HCJB's international transmitter site in Pifo, Ecuador

The beginning of the end of HCJB's direct shortwave broadcasts was the decision of the Ecuadorian government to demand the removal of HCJB's shortwave transmitter station, with the opening of the new Quito airport.

Initial considerations were made to build a new transmitter station in the lowlands near Guayaquil. However, mission leadership in the US decided to abandon the shortwave programs from Ecuador. The transmitter station in Pifo near Quito was gradually shut down and dismantled by 2008. On 30. September 2009 after nearly 80 years of shortwave broadcasting from Ecuador, Radio Station HCJB ended its extensive worldwide shortwave transmissions. According to HCJB Global President Wayne Pederson, the change was made because

“the way people consume media has changed, so we have the opportunity to change to delivery systems such as satellite, AM/FM and the Internet. The closing of shortwave in Latin America is strategic because of the planting of local radio stations across the region and around the world. These stations are staffed and programmed by local Christians who can speak to the culture in their own communities.”

HCJB Global's focus is now on “radio planting” – assisting local Christian ministries in beginning and implementing their own Christian radio ministries on FM stations.

The US mission, which renamed itself Reach Beyond in 2014, used some of its technology for a new project. A station with the equipment was built in Kununurra in northern Australia to serve parts of Asia.

HCJB continued shortwave broadcast on a small level from Mt. Pichincha, near Quito on 6 050 kHz with Spanish and indigenous languages programs for Ecuador. The double dipole (CT2/1/0.3) antenna is designed to cover only Ecuador, but the 5 kW signal is reported by worldwide lsiteners from time to time. After replacement of the 40 year-old 5 kW transmitter with a new 1 kW solid state transmitter in 2017, it became even more of a challenge for DX listeners, but is still heard within Ecuador.

== Worldwide audience ==
HCJB was popular with a worldwide audience of shortwave listeners (DXers). They were less interested in the religious content than in receiving a station from South America (BRand: The Voice of the Andes).

Following the first years of HCJB's broadcasts on 50.26 meters (5.986 MHz), the shortwave frequencies utilized by HCJB for its broadcasts from Quito were 6.05 MHz, 9.745 MHz, 11.775 MHz and 15.155 MHz. As the station's transmitting power increased, shortwave radio enthusiasts in North America started receiving the station's broadcasts, submitting reception reports in order to provide the HCJB engineers feedback on the station's signal strength and quality.

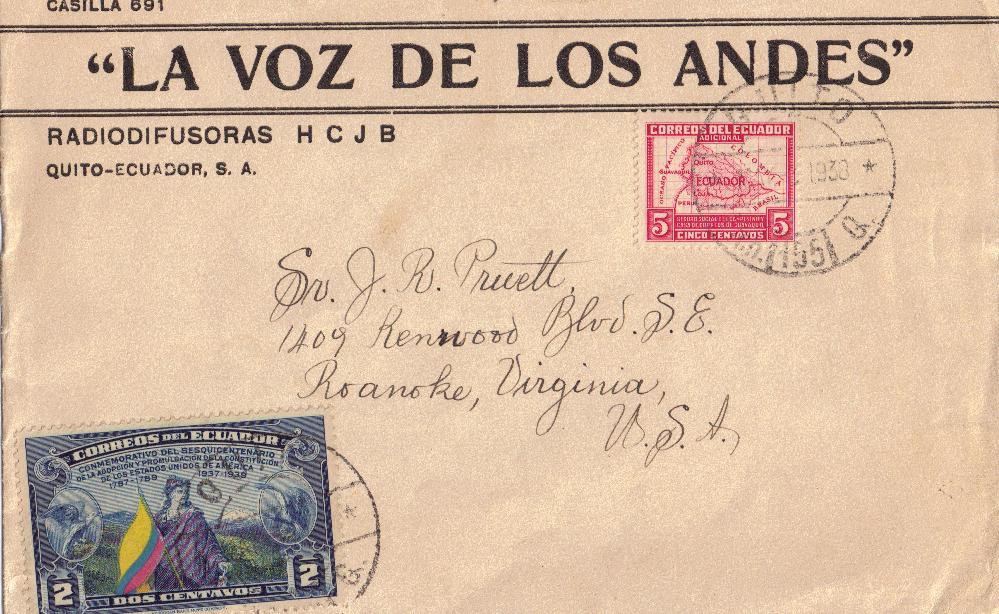
An HCJB envelope with a 1938 postmark which contained a QSL card sent to the addressee

Since a popular practice in the hobby of shortwave radio listening was to request a QSL card, HCJB started creating its own QSLs in 1932. In the 1970this HCJB was heard around the world and received hundreds of letters each week with reception reports from shortwave DXers. The correspondence department of HCJB responded in kind to its listeners with QSL cards and Christian tracts. As requests for QSLs became more frequent, HCJB missionary and radio engineer Clayton Howard suggested a shortwave listeners' club be created. In 1974, the Andes DXers International, (or "ANDEX") began. Members would receive a membership certificate and membership card with the member's name and individual member number, along with Howard's signature. A monthly bulletin (later bi-monthly) was sent to members. ANDEX eventually had a membership in the thousands and continued as a service of HCJB until 1996.

Since the station's first year of broadcasting, staff members produced the HCJB's own original radio programming. HCJB's original programming has ranged from programs completely in Quichua (the primary language of the people of the Andes), Andean-music programs, Christian music programming, talk and mail-reading programs featuring mail received from listeners around the world, Bible study and teaching programs, and programming featuring information about shortwave radio listening. Some of the most popular HCJB-produced programs over the years have been "Morning in the Mountains," "Musica del Ecuador", "Musical Mailbag," "Happiness Is" and "DX-Partyline." DX-Partyline was hosted from its inception by HCJB missionary Clayton Howard and his wife, Helen. The program was heard for more than 40 years, twice a week, and included the reading of letters from shortwave listeners around the world as well as DX and reception reports sent to the station. DX-Partyline also included shortwave radio listening tips, information on antennas, and equipment reviews. Programs not produced by HCJB were also broadcast from the Quito station. Typically of a religious nature, some of the non-HCJB produced programs broadcast from the station were the Pacific Garden Mission's "Unshackled!", the Billy Graham Evangelistic Association's Hour of Decision, the Salvation Army's "Wonderful Words of Life" and Moody Bible Institute radio station WMBI-FM's "Nightsounds" with Bill Pearce, among many others. Much of HCJB's original programming also included music recorded, produced and performed by HCJB missionaries. Much of the HCJB-produced music broadcast on the station was also available on LP record albums and later on cassette tapes.

In December 1995, Radio Netherlands' Media Network program visited the transmitter site at Pifo with two members of the HCJB production team. The program can be found in the Media Network vintage vault.

== Milestones and achievements ==
- 1931 - The station's first broadcast using a 200-watt transmitter designed and built by HCJB engineer Eric Williams.
- 1936 - An RCA medium-wave transmitter is added.
- 1937 - Addition of a 1,000-watt transmitter designed and built by HCJB engineer Victoriano Salvador.
- 1940 - The station adds a 10,000-watt transmitter designed and built by HCJB engineer Clarence C. Moore, allowing the station's broadcast signal to reach around the world.
- 1940 - Clarence Moore invents, and later patents a "Quad" antenna (Not the same as today's cubical quad antennas) and puts it into use at HCJB.
- 1952 - the station moves its shortwave broadcasting to a new site in Pifo, Ecuador.
- 1956 - HCJB begins broadcasting with its first high-powered 50,000-watt transmitter designed by HCJB Engineer Herb Jacobson and built by HCJB engineers and staff.
- 1965 - The station's own hydro-electric plant at Papallacta begins generating electricity to power shortwave broadcasts from Pifo.
- 1967 - The station purchases three RCA 100,000-watt shortwave transmitters. The units required extensive reworking and entered into service in 1968, 1969 and 1970.
- 1979 - The construction of a steerable antenna is completed.
- 1981 - A 500,000-watt shortwave transmitter capable of overcoming any Russian jamming efforts is put into use. The transmitter was designed and built by HCJB Engineers at facilities loaned by Clarence Moore at Crown International in Elkhart, Indiana.
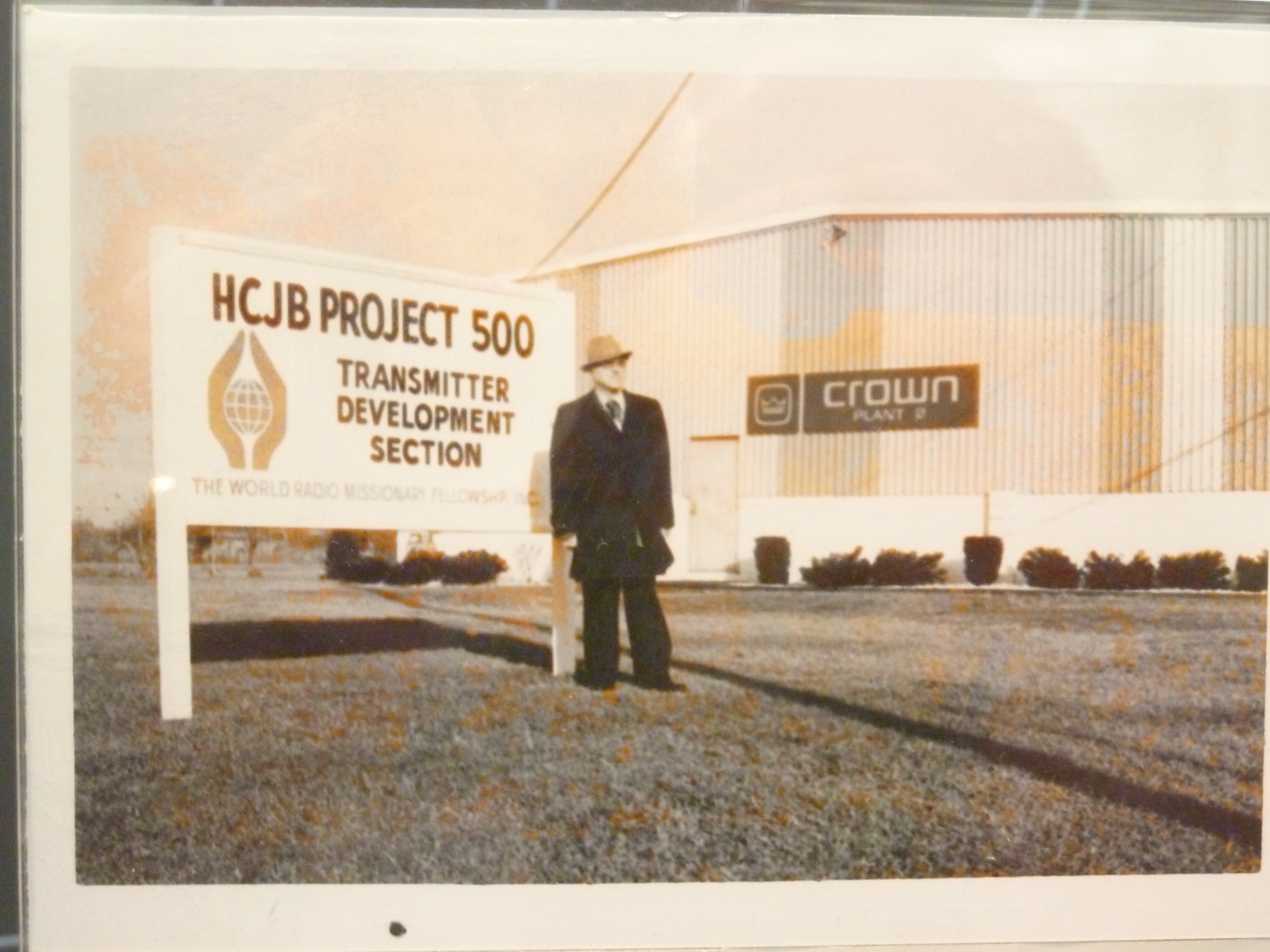
  Clarence C. Moore poses as plant 2 of his company "Crown International" is dedicated for use in development of a 500,000-watt radio transmitter for HCJB.
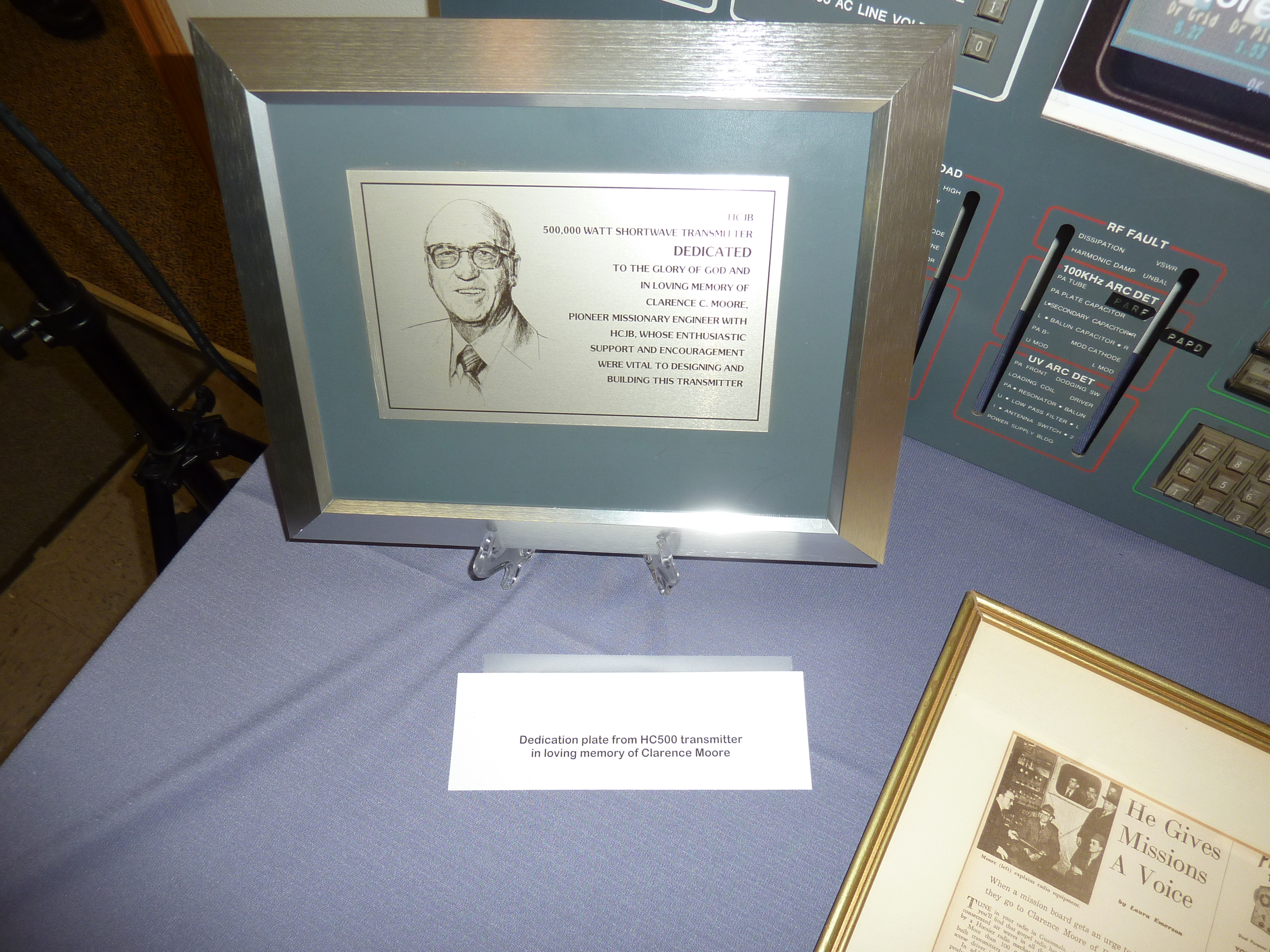
  Clarence C. Moore is remembered for his contribution in developing a 500,000-watt transmitter for HCJB. He died two years before the project was completed in 1981.
- 1982 - A second hydro-electric plant at Papallacta to provide power for the station's shortwave broadcasts is added.
- 1986 - The HCJB World Radio Engineering Center (now called SonSet Solutions) was created at the Crown International facilities under the direction of David Pasechnik. The goal was to design and build HC100 (100,000-watt) shortwave transmitters for HCJB and the ministry's contributors in the "World by 2000" challenge.
- 1992 - A radio station in Bukavu, Zaire is "planted" by HCJB. The station used a portable FM transmitter designed and built by staff at the HCJB Engineering Center.

HCJB Global Technology staff members are involved in research, development, training and technical support for AM, FM and shortwave radio stations as well as satellite distribution and satellite-based internet services. In recent years, they have developed station automation systems and a fixed-tuned, solar-powered SonSet radio that can be pre-tuned to pick up a specific Christian radio station. HCJB Global staff have been active in pioneering equipment and software for a form of digital radio broadcasting called DRM.

== See also ==
- HCJB-TV
- World Radio Missionary Fellowship, Inc.
- Mission Aviation Fellowship
- Shortwave listening
