= KVMV =

Christian AC radio station in McAllen, Texas

- McAllen, Texas; United States
- Broadcast area: Rio Grande Valley
- Frequency: 96.9 MHz
- Branding: 96.9 KVMV

Programming
- Format: Christian adult contemporary

Ownership
- Owner: World Radio Network, Inc.

History
- First air date: March 9, 1972

Technical information
- Licensing authority: FCC
- Facility ID: 73749
- Class: C
- ERP: 100,000 watts
- HAAT: 350 m (1,148 ft)
- Transmitter coordinates: 26°4′53.00″N 97°49′44.00″W

Links
- Public license information: Public file; LMS
- Website: kvmv.org

KVMV (96.9 FM) is a Christian non-commercial radio station licensed to McAllen, Texas, which serves the Lower Rio Grande Valley. The station broadcasts a Christian adult contemporary radio format, switching to Christmas music from Black Friday to Christmas Day. The station is currently owned by World Radio Network, Inc.

== History ==
The station first came on the air on March 9, 1972, branding as KVMV-FM 97. In the early 2010s, KVMV changed their branding to 96.9 KVMV.

In 2002, K268AP-FM in Falfurrias, Texas became a simulcast of KVMV.
