= Varizone =

Varizone is a fully digital public address system technology developed and produced and by Klotz Digital.

In contrast to traditional public address systems using analogue 70 or 100 volt speaker systems Varizone is a fully digital system that transmits the audio digitally to the speaker, where it is amplified by small, distributed programmable amplifier modules.

The system combines voice evacuation system features with digital public address, intercom, and background music functionality by adjusting the volume for each speaker individually depending on the application.

== Technology ==
A completely digital bus structure distributes uncompressed digital audio data without any audible latency from one or many play-out stations to an unlimited number of locally amplified loudspeakers using either CAT5 or J-Y(ST)Y wires. The same bus supplies all active bus components with electrical power (e.g. powered amplifier modules (I-PAM), push button modules and noise sensing modules) and makes the need for additional external power supplies redundant.

=== Digital audio buses ===
The VARIZONE network uses a digital speaker system (DSS) bus format to transmit data and power at 48 volts over the same wires from a central play-out station to the loudspeakers. The DSS bus combines central network structures with a bus architecture, saving on cabling and wiring time and eliminating the need for additional hubs and routers even for the largest networks. A DSS bus can effectively run unlimited distances. The bus format is guaranteed to transmit 8 channels of audio with 16-bit resolution at 48 kHz up to 200 m (660 ft) without the need to refresh data in addition to bi-directional control and surveillance data. The OCTO-BUS architecture transmits audio as well as bi-directional control data between a central control station and remotely located converter modules and control modules. The OCTO-BUS can be configured with either 8 channels per direction with 16-bit resolution per audio channel at 48 kHz of sampling rate or for 4 channels with 24 bit resolution per audio channel at 48 kHz. In applications where studio quality is required 24 bit resolution is recommended, whereas in all other PA applications the 16-bit resolution still offers CD-quality audio.

=== Programmable amplifier modules ===
On the digital bus line, programmable amplifier modules are distributed to provide amplification for connected loudspeakers.

The modules are digital Class-D amplifiers with extremely low heat dissipation. Their rugged design allows above-ceiling mounting close to loudspeaker locations. The programmable amplifier modules receive the necessary power to drive loudspeakers from the same cable that transmits the audio data and do not require any additional local power supply.

== See also ==
- Public address
- Audio router
- Constant-voltage speaker system
