= PZM =

PZM may refer to:

- Patrulleros de Zona Marítima PZM offshore patrol vessels
- Polski Związek Motorowy (en. Polish Motor Union), a member of Fédération Internationale de l'Automobile
- Polska Żegluga Morska (in English: Polsteam), a freight ship operator based in Szczecin, Poland
- PZM (microphone), Pressure Zone Microphone
