= Crown Radio Corporation =

Defunct electronics manufacturer

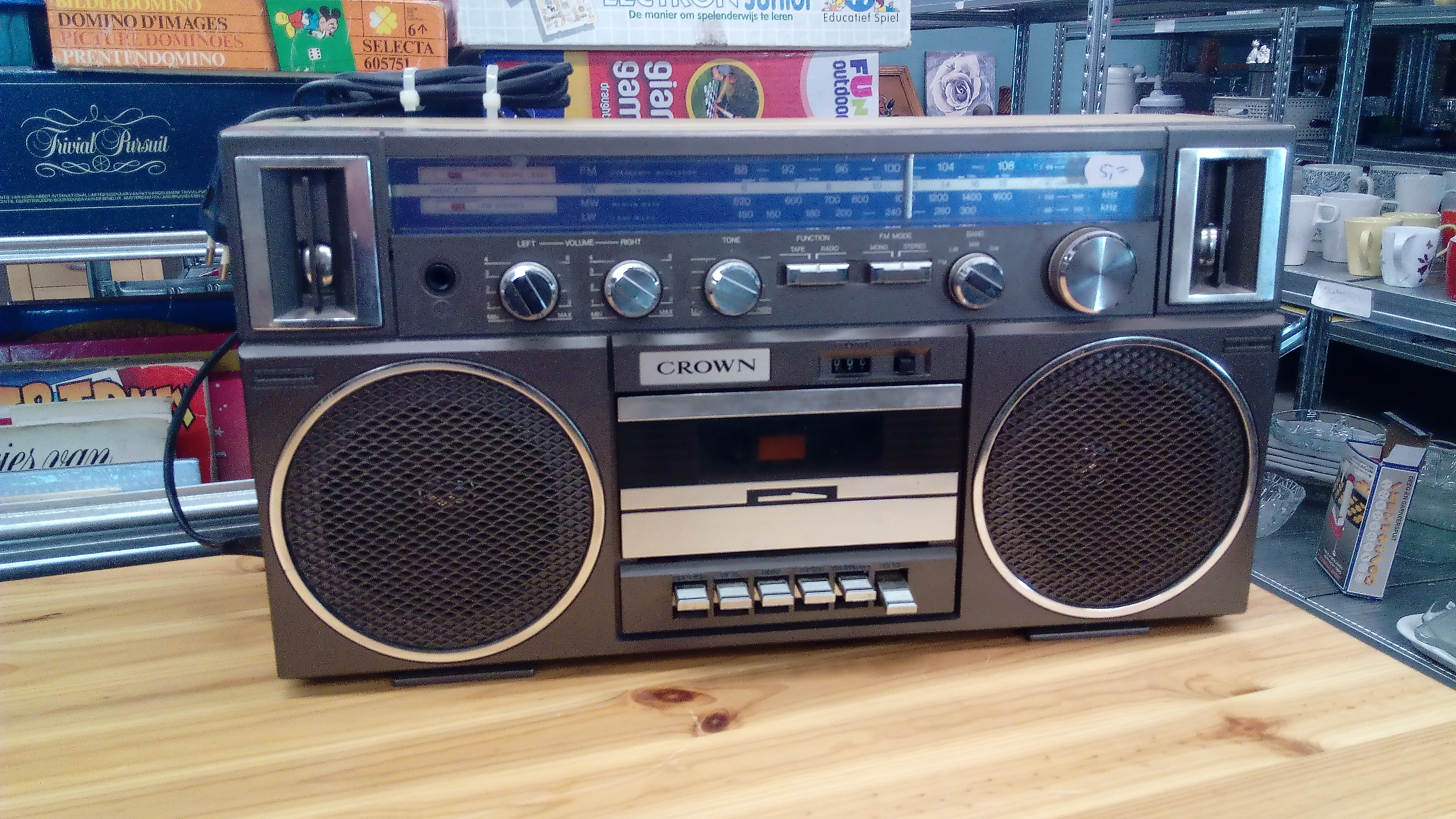
- A Crown CSC-53L radio and cassette player.
- Trade name: Crown, bUbU
- Native name: クラウン株式会社
- Romanized name: Kuraun Kabushiki-gaisha
- Formerly: Asahi Musen Denki Co., Ltd. (1948–1960); Crown Radio Corporation (1960–1985); Crown Corporation (1985–1993); Miyakoshi Corporation (1993–2012)
- Type: Subsidiary
- Industry: Consumer electronics (historical); Real estate (current)
- Incorporated: Japan
- Founded: May 1948; 78 years ago in Tokyo, Japan
- Defunct: October 1993 (as an active electronics manufacturer)
- Fate: Swapped business model to real estate, rebranded to Miyakoshi Corporation
- Successor: Miyakoshi Holdings Co., Ltd.
- Headquarters: Tokyo, Japan
- Area served: Worldwide
- Products: Transistor radios, cassette players, tape recorders, televisions, pocket calculators
- Brands: Crown, bUbU
- Parent: Miyakoshi Holdings
- Website: www.miyakoshi-holdings.com

Crown Radio Corporation (Japanese: クラウン株式会社, Kuraun Kabushiki-gaisha) or Crown Radio Corp. was a Japanese consumer electronics manufacturer headquartered in Tokyo. Founded in 1948 as Asahi Musen Denki, the company became highly regarded for its portable transistor radios, cassette players, televisions, and electronic calculators sold globally under the CROWN brand.

During the peak of the post-war Japanese electronics boom in the 1960s and 1970s, Crown established itself as a mid-tier manufacturer of home audio equipment. After experiencing corporate restructurings under the retail giant Daiei and subsequently the Miyakoshi group, the company officially ceased electronics manufacturing in October 1993, shifting its core business to real estate development and investment.

Today, the corporate successor exists as a subsidiary of the Tokyo Stock Exchange-listed Miyakoshi Holdings Co., Ltd. (TYO: 6620).

== History ==
=== Founding and early development (1948–1960) ===
The company was established in May 1948 under the name Asahi Musen Denki Co., Ltd. (Japanese: 株式会社旭無線電機, translated as Asahi Wireless Electric). Its early business focused on manufacturing general radio parts and wireless equipment components during the reconstruction of post-WWII Japan.

By April 1955, the company expanded into consumer manufacturing by producing its first portable radios, which it began exporting internationally under the newly introduced "CROWN" trademark. Reflecting the rapid adoption of early semiconductor technology, the brand quickly established a niche in pocket-sized transistor radios.

=== Public growth and expansion (1960–1979) ===
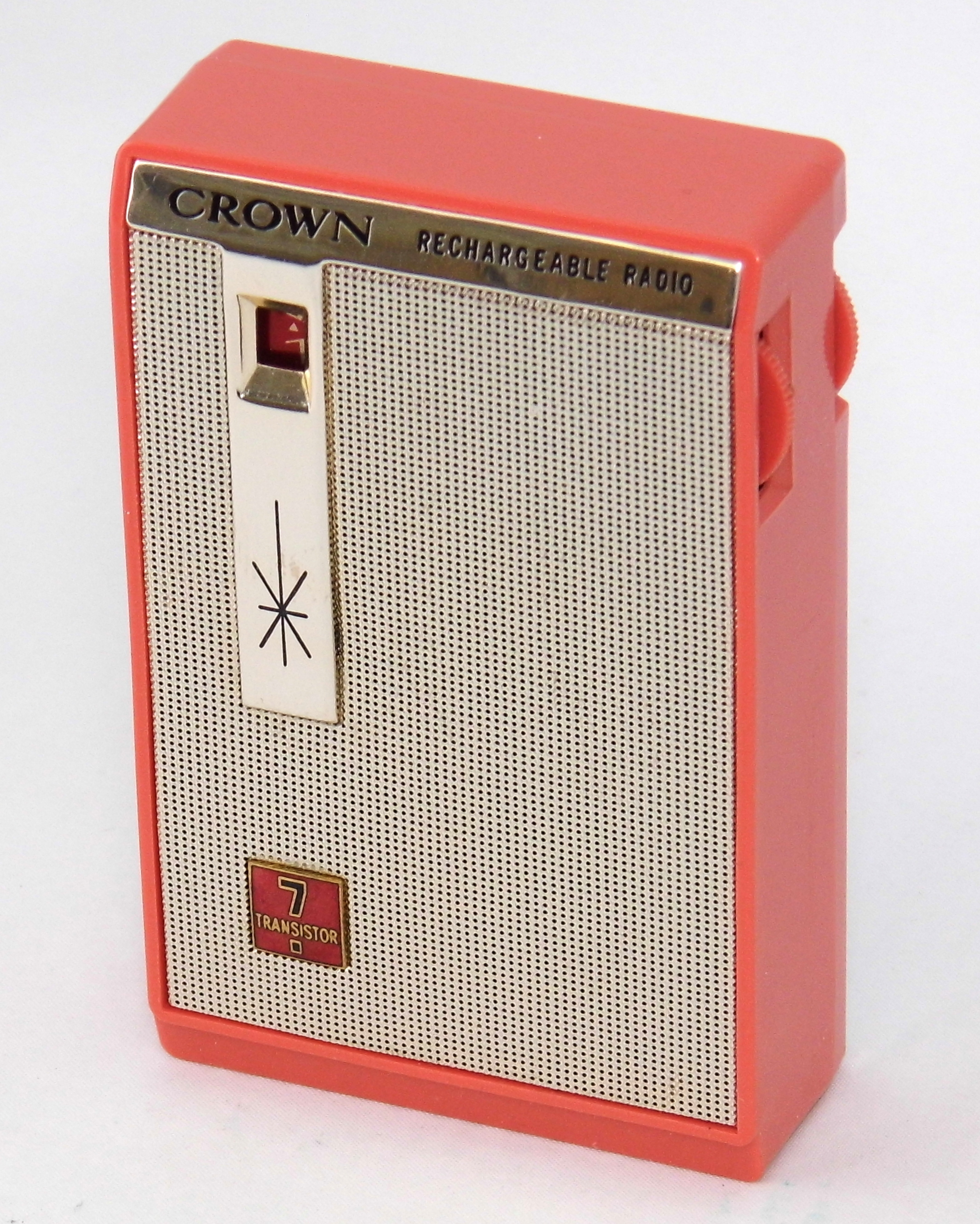
AM band 7 transistor Crown Niccad TR-770R rechargeable transistor radio made In Japan, circa 1963

In April 1960, the company officially changed its corporate name to Crown Radio Corporation (クラウン株式会社) to align its corporate identity with its globally recognized brand. In October 1961, the company was listed on the Second Section of the Tokyo Stock Exchange.

Throughout the 1960s, Crown Radio Corporation diversified its product catalog beyond pocket radios:

- 1965 - Began manufacturing black-and-white (monochrome) televisions.
- 1968 - Listed on the Second Section of the Osaka Securities Exchange.
- 1969 - Designated to the prestigious First Section of both the Tokyo and Osaka Stock Exchanges.
- 1970 - Began manufacturing color televisions.

During this era, Crown exported portable record players, radio-phonographs, reel-to-reel tape recorders (often marketed under the "Crowncorder" line), and multi-band radio receivers worldwide.

=== Daiei partnership and the BUBU brand ===
In the 1970s, the Japanese retail conglomerate Daiei acquired a controlling stake in Crown Radio Corporation. Under Daiei's ownership, Crown acted as a primary original equipment manufacturer (OEM) for Daiei's private-label electronics brand, BUBU (often stylized as bUbU).

Under the BUBU brand, Crown manufactured a wide variety of consumer goods, including portable radio cassette players (boomboxes), pocket calculators, and household television sets sold across Daiei's extensive supermarket network.

=== Miyakoshi acquisition and restructuring (1983–1993) ===
In August 1983, Kunimasa Miyakoshi—the founder of Toho Denki (a Japanese electronics firm notable for being the first Japanese enterprise to establish joint manufacturing ventures in China after the normalization of diplomatic relations in 1977)—purchased the controlling stake in Crown from Daiei.

Following the acquisition, the corporation underwent several structural adjustments:

- July 1985 - The English corporate name was shortened from Crown Radio Corporation to Crown Corporation.
- October 1987 - The company absorbed Tajiri Kikai Kogyo Co., Ltd., a refrigeration equipment manufacturer previously controlled by Toshiba.
- Late 1980s - Crown achieved widespread domestic presence in retail electronics shops, primarily known for producing affordable high-fidelity audio systems, dual-deck cassette recorders, and CD boomboxes.

=== Exit from electronics ===
Faced with intense competition from cheaper foreign manufacturers and shifting global markets in the early 1990s, the company decided to exit the highly saturated consumer electronics industry.

In October 1993, the company officially changed its name to Miyakoshi Corporation (Japanese: 宮越商事株式会社, Miyakoshi Shōji Kabushiki-gaisha) and shut down its consumer audio and visual electronics production lines.

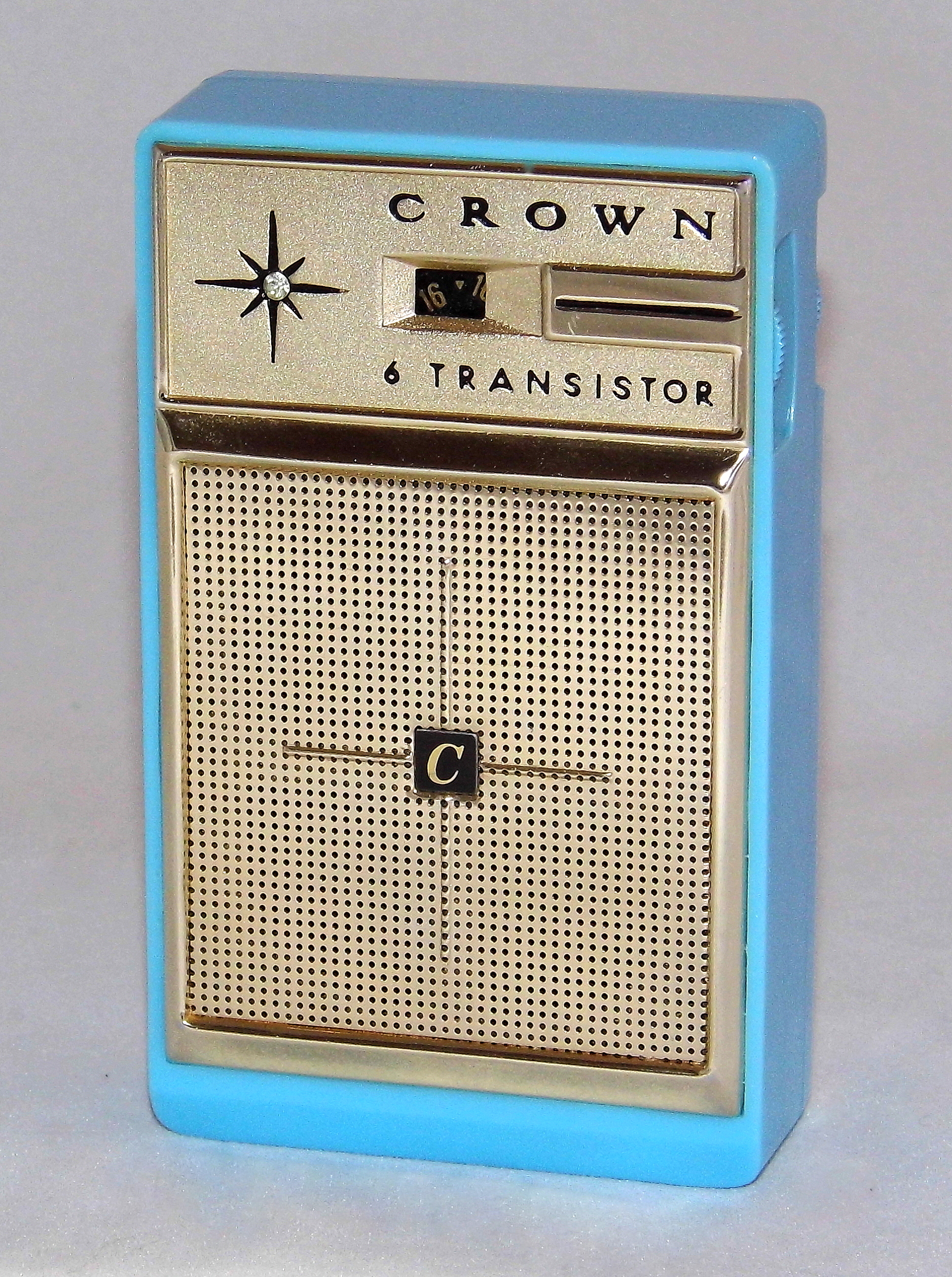
Crown transistor AM radio TR-690 using 6 transistors, circa 1960s

In October 2011, Miyakoshi Corporation transitioned into a pure holding company structure. A sole share transfer created the publicly traded parent company, Miyakoshi Holdings Co., Ltd. In July 2012, the subsidiary that had originally carried the Crown legacy was renamed back to Crown Co., Ltd. (Japanese: クラウン株式会社). Today, the business operates in real estate development, asset management, and investments, primarily focused on the redevelopment of its historical industrial footprint, such as the Crown Industrial Park and the World Innovation Center (WIC) projects in Shenzhen, China.

== Classic product lines ==
During its active years, Crown was notable for product categories such as:

- Transistor radios - Early pocket radios like the 1958 Crown TR-666 (a 6-transistor model featuring Hitachi semiconductors) and the 1959 TR-7S are collectible vintage items nowadays.
- Crowncorder tape recorders - These portable reel-to-reel magnetic tape recorders (such as the CTR-5050 and CTR-320W) were popular in the 1960s.
- Stereo boomboxes - In the late 1970s and 1980s, Crown became well-regarded for its rugged, feature-rich boomboxes (such as the CSC-830L and SZ-K220), which became widely recognizable symbols of early hip-hop and street music culture internationally.
- Electronic calculators - During the 1970s, Crown manufactured desktop and pocket electronic calculators (e.g., the CL-80K or the BUBU 140) both for its proprietary brand and under OEM contracts.

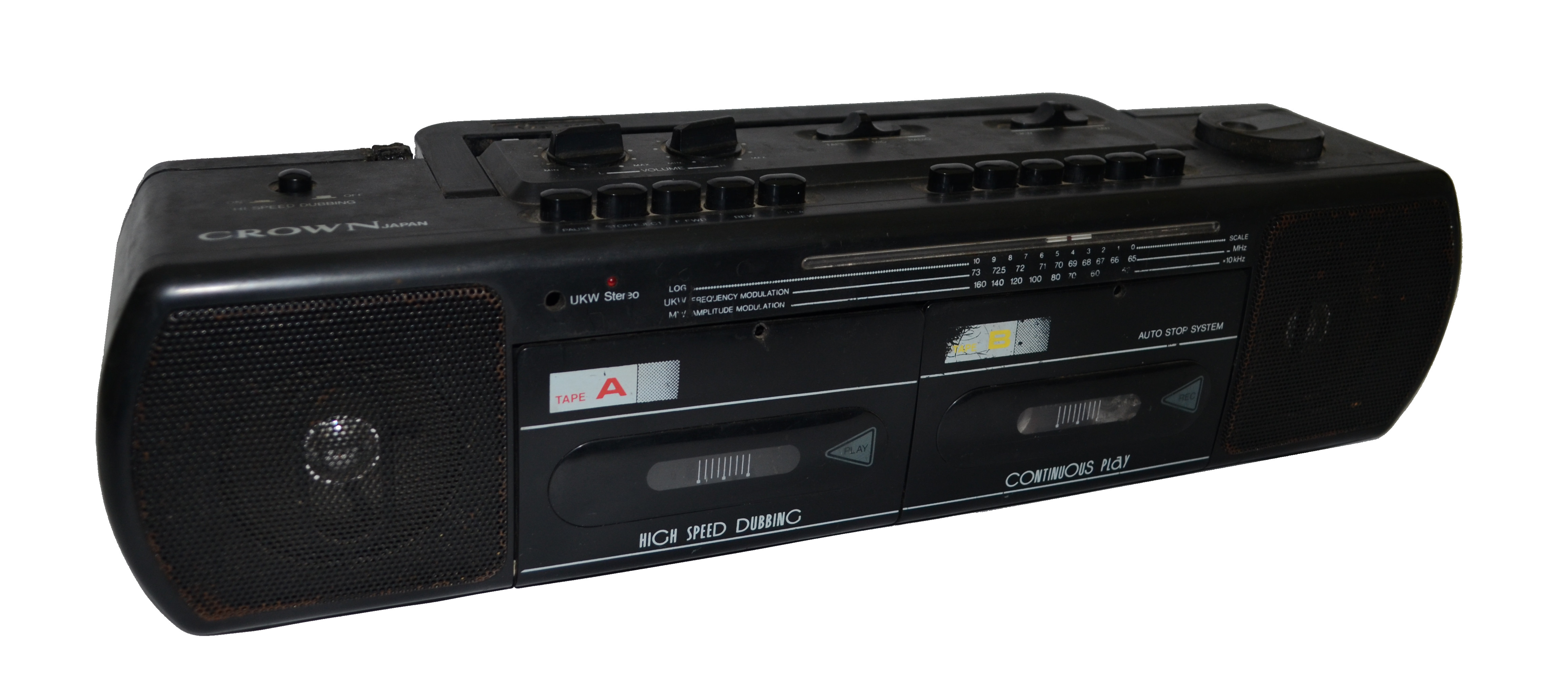
Crown SZ-K220 radio double-cassette recorder, built by Crown in 1990

== Brand confusion ==
Vintage electronics collectors occasionally confuse Crown Radio Corporation (Japan) with Crown International. Crown International (originally International Radio and Electronics Corporation, or IREC) was an unrelated high-end American audio and amplifier manufacturer based in Elkhart, Indiana, which was later acquired by Harman International (and subsequently Samsung Electronics). The Japanese Crown Radio Corporation products are typically identified by their unique "crown" logo crest and "Made in Japan" markings.
