= Constant voltage =

Constant voltage may refer to:

- Constant-voltage speaker system, a distributed speaker system
- Voltage source, electrical power source that regulate voltage to a constant level
