= Clarence C. Moore =

American missionary (1904–1979)

Clarence C. Moore (1904-January 24, 1979) was an engineer and minister at Radio Station HCJB (subsequently known as HCJB Global and now known as Reach Beyond) with primary transmitters in Quito, Ecuador.

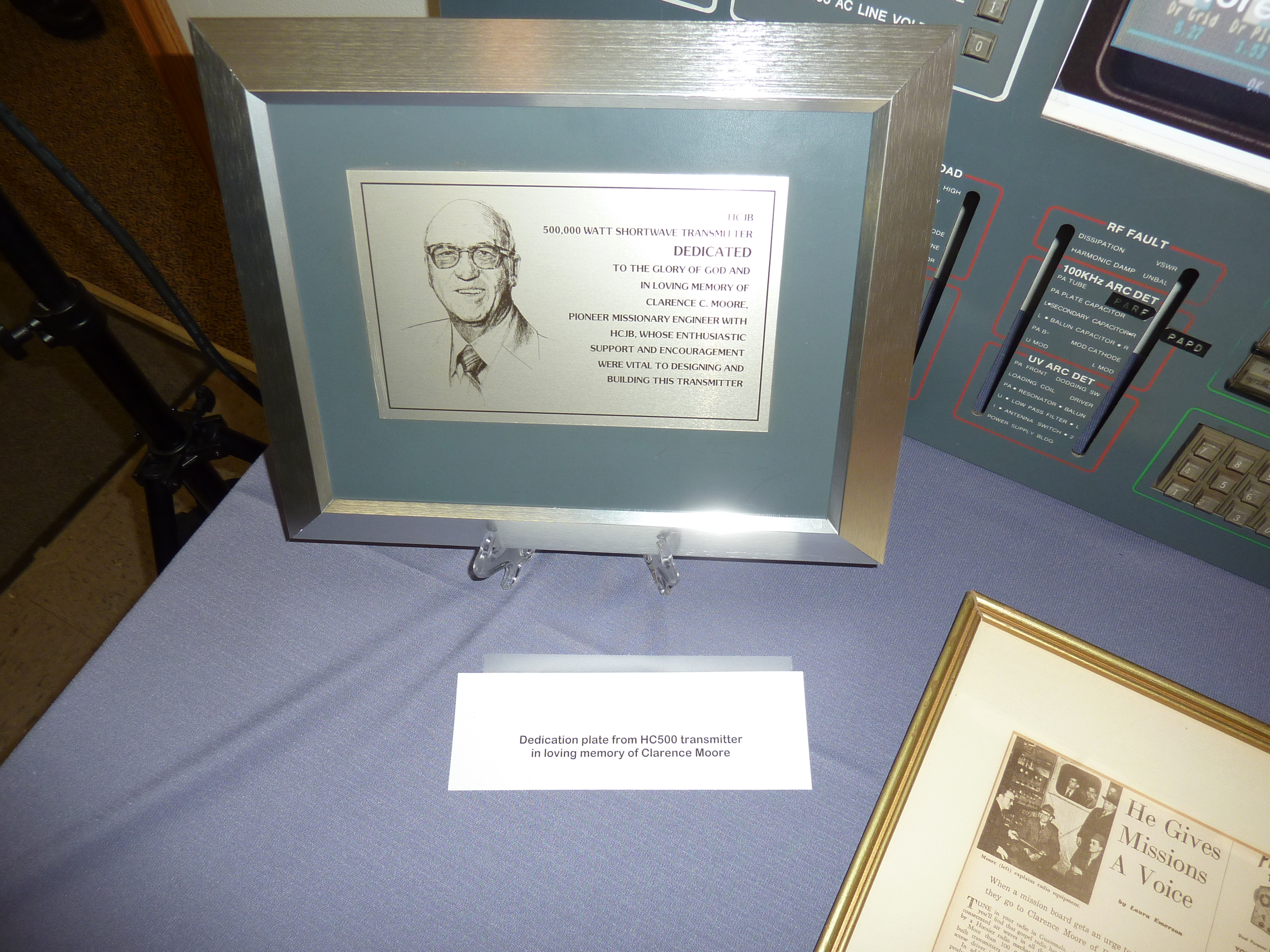
Clarence C. Moore contributed to development of a 500,000 watt transmitter for HCJB. He died two years before the project was completed in 1981.

He went on to found International Radio and Electronics Corporation (IREC) in Elkhart, Indiana which was renamed Crown International in the 1960s at the suggestion of his wife Ruby. Crown International manufactured electronic devices including power amplifiers. loudspeakers and tape recorders. The audio division was acquired by Harman International in March 2000.

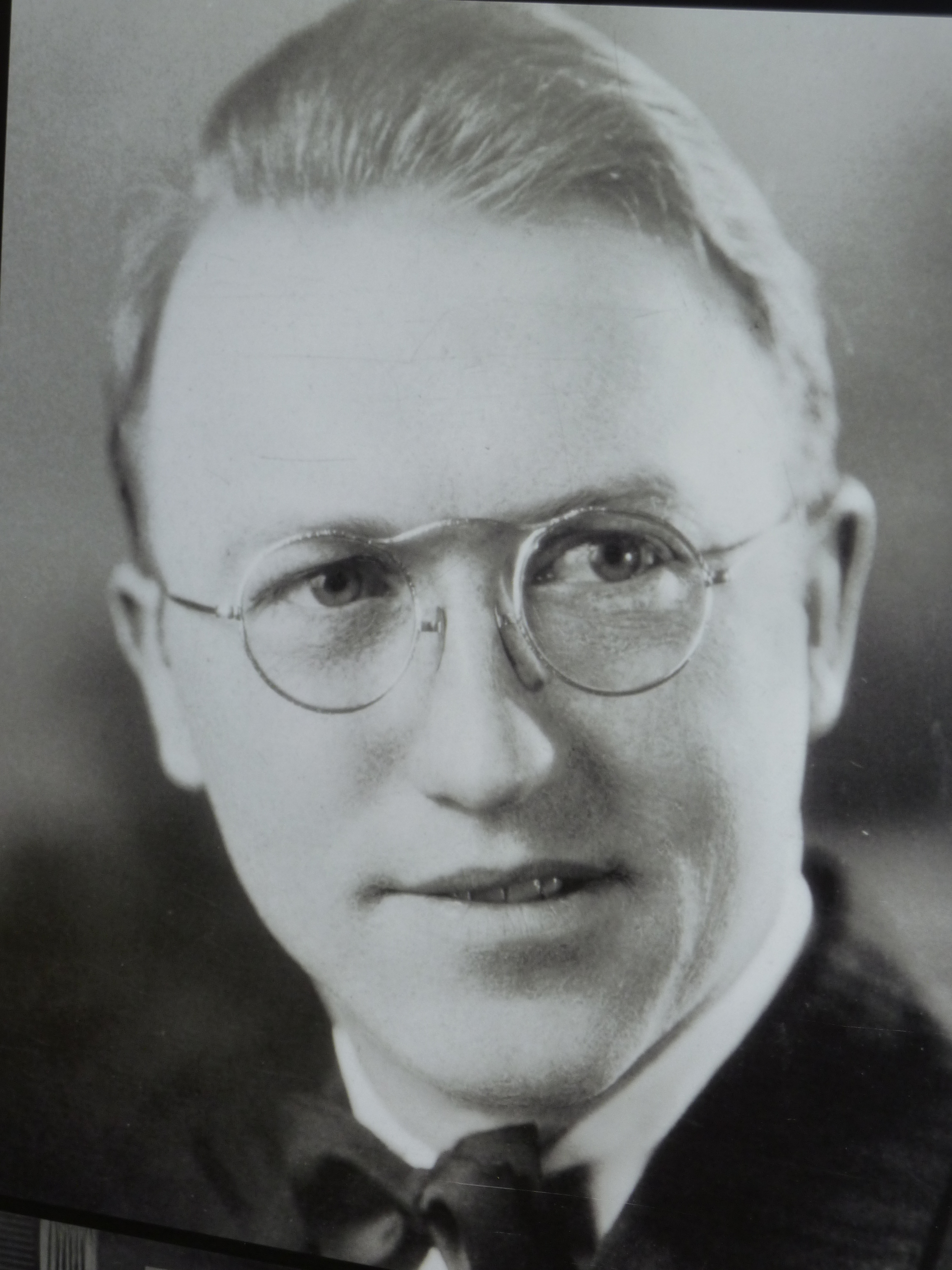
Clarence Cecil Moore c.1930.

Moore was an amateur radio operator with call signs of W9LZX and HC1JB. He developed and patented the cubical quad antenna, patented as US 2,537,191..

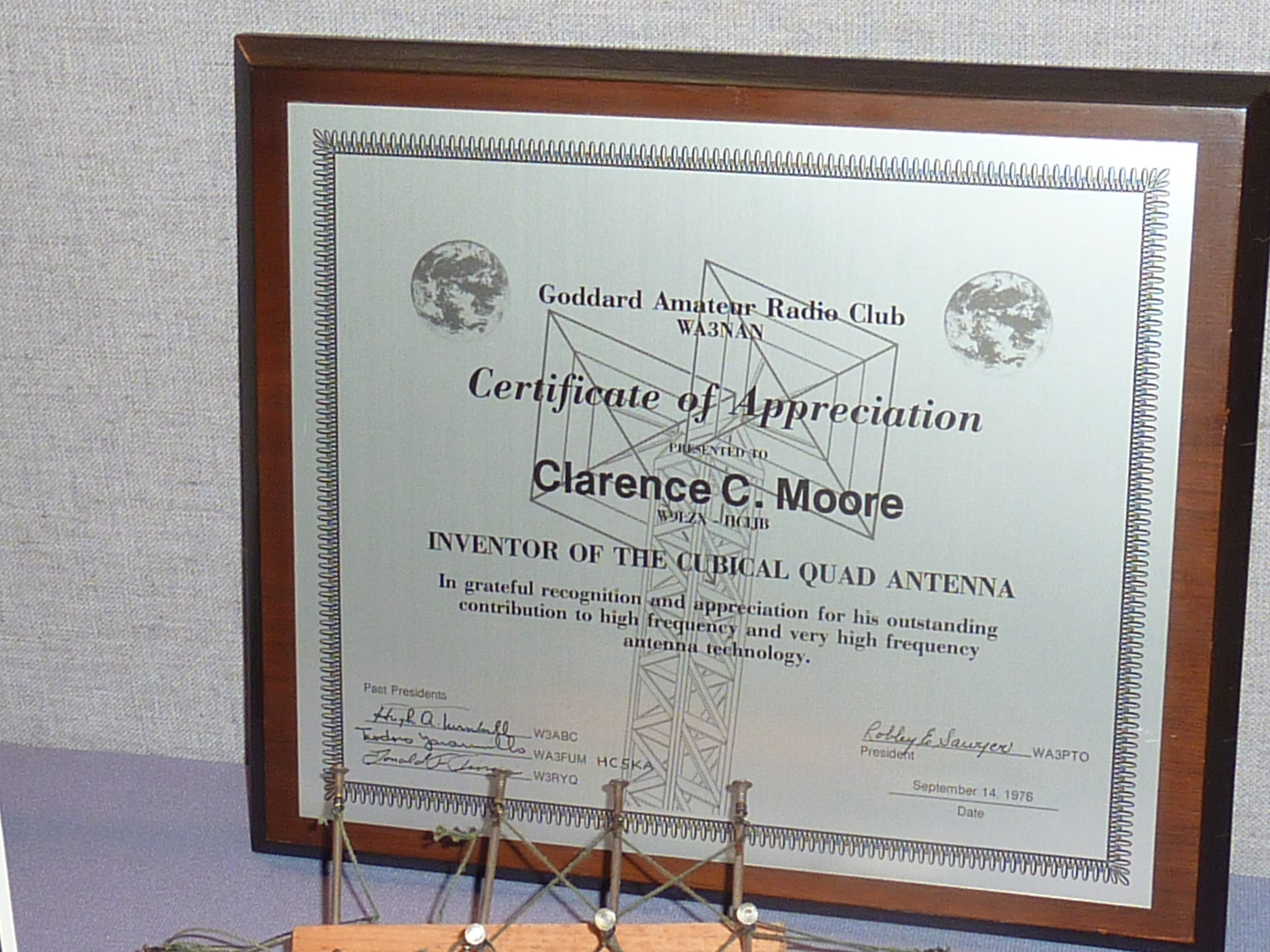
Amateur Radio Club honors Clarence C. Moore as the inventor of the cubical quad antenna.

Moore also owned domestic radio stations WXAX and WCMR.
