= Awana =

Nonprofit Christian youth ministry organization

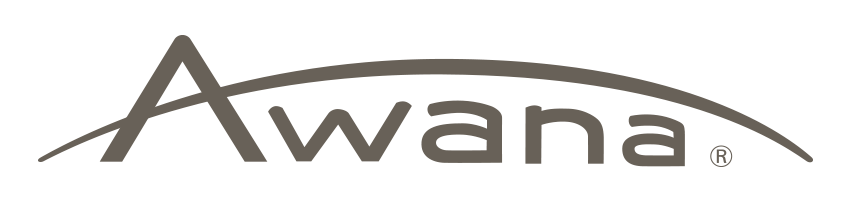
- Founded: 1950
- Founders: Lance Latham, Art Rorheim
- Type: 501(c)(3) non-profit religious
- Location: St. Charles, Illinois, U.S.
- Region served: U.S. and International (133 countries)
- Key people: Matt Markins, President/CEO; Kevin White, COO; Michael Handler, Chief Innovation/Communications Officer; Brian Rhodes, Chief Revenue Officer/Global Ministries; Art Rorheim, Co-Founder; Valerie Bell, CEO Emeritus
- Website: www.awana.org

Awana is an international evangelical Christian nonprofit organization in child and youth discipleship. The headquarters are in St. Charles, Illinois, United States.

== History ==
In 1941, the children's program at the North Side Gospel Center in Chicago laid the foundation for the principles of Awana. Lance Latham, North Side's senior pastor, collaborated with the church's youth director, Art Rorheim, to develop weekly clubs that they believed would appeal to all children. Other churches became interested in the program and inquired about its availability. In 1950, Latham and Rorheim founded Awana as a parachurch organization. Rorheim served as president emeritus until his death on January 5, 2018.

The name is derived as an acronym of "Approved Workmen Are Not Ashamed", taken from 2 Timothy 2:15. As of 2019, Awana claims to work with over 61,000 churches in 122 countries.

== Programs ==
Awana offers resources and Bible-based training programs for children ages 2 to 18 in churches. Children are encouraged, but not required, to memorize Bible verses for credit or to redeem for small prizes.

Each Awana program is arranged into different groups that are separated by the ages and grades of the children attending. These groups include Puggles (ages 2 to 3), Cubbies (preschoolers, ages 4 to 5), Sparks (Kindergarten to 2nd Grade), Truth and Training, or T&T (Grades 3 to 6), Trek (Middle School), and Journey (High School). Although Awana offers programs for ages 2 to 18, churches that run an Awana program are not required to run a club for every age group.

== See also ==
- Christian Service Brigade
- Pathfinders (Seventh-day Adventist)
- Royal Rangers
- Trail Life USA
- Child Evangelism Fellowship
- Child evangelism movement
