= Christian Service Brigade =

North American Christian organization

The Christian Service Brigade Shield

Christian Service Brigade (CSB) (part of CSB Ministries) is a non-denominational Christian organization for men and boys in the United States and Canada. Often referred to as "Brigade," it is organized according to a model historically similar to that of international Boys' Brigade and Scouting organizations. More than a scout alternative, Brigade programs put a particular emphasis on the relationship between fathers and sons, and equip men in the local church to mentor and disciple boys and young men through an action-driven process, with a spiritual application associated with all activities. Brigade units are sponsored by local churches, and these are typically Protestant and Evangelical in character. The Christian Service Brigade motto is "Bright and Keen for Christ."

== History ==
Brigade was founded in 1937 by Joe Coughlin (1919–2005), then a sophomore at Wheaton College, Illinois. It began as a boys' group, under the name of the "Christian Service Squad," at the Methodist church in the Chicago suburb of Glen Ellyn, Illinois, where Coughlin served as a Sunday School teacher. By 1940, when Christian Service Brigade was formally organized with a governing board, there were Brigade units at 18 churches in the Chicago area. From there, Brigade spread to churches across the United States and Canada. Today, units are most highly concentrated in the states of New York, Pennsylvania, New Jersey, and Ohio.

== Organization ==
"Units" refer to the individual chapters of Christian Service Brigade at local churches. Units are numbered in the order of their founding, and each unit can consist of any (and often all) of the following programs:

- Tadpoles (ages 4–5)
- Tree Climbers (ages 6–7)
- Stockade (ages 8–11)
- Treks (ages 8–11)
- Battalion (ages 12–18)
- Vanguard (college age)

== Stockade ==
Stockade (ages 8–11) is a program organized along the lines of the Cub Scouts. A Stockade is headed by an adult volunteer, the Chief Ranger, who is assisted by other adult volunteers, Rangers, who supervise sub-units called posts. Boys are typically assigned to posts according to their age. All Stockaders wear light blue uniforms that sport patches marking the accomplishment of various achievements. Builders (8 and 9 year-olds) earn patches called Blockhouses (of which there are eight), while Sentinels (10 and 11 year-olds) earn patches called Stations (of which there are also eight). The dark green uniforms worn by Rangers and Chief Rangers are similar to those worn by Brigadiers (members of Battalion).

== Battalion ==
Battalion (ages 12–18) is a program organized along the lines of the Boy Scouts of America. Each Battalion is headed by a Captain, an adult volunteer, who is assisted by other adult volunteers, called Lieutenants. At the Battalion level, considerable leadership responsibility devolves to the Brigadiers themselves. The student leader of the Battalion is the Sergeant (typically a high-school senior), who is assisted by Corporals and Lance Corporals, student leaders in charge of sub-units called squads. Brigadiers wear dark green uniforms that sport Activity Patches marking the accomplishment of various achievements. By earning Activity Patches and fulfilling other requirements, Brigadiers move up through the ranks of Observer, Explorer, Trailblazer, Guide, One Star, Two Star, and Three Star.

Christian Service Brigade

== Herald of Christ ==
The Herald of Christ is the highest honor conferred by Christian Service Brigade. It is awarded only to Brigadiers who profess a faith in Christ, have attained the rank of Three Star, and have passed their 16th birthday. A candidate for the Herald of Christ must also complete a series of written reflections on selected Bible passages, memorize additional passages from the Bible, complete a three-month church-related ministry project, complete a three-month community project, and submit a 1000-word essay of reflection on his faith. The award is conferred upon the approval of both a candidate committee and a CSB Regional Director.

== Governance ==
Christian Service Brigade is operated under the aegis of CSB Ministries, headquartered in Hamburg, New York. Regional Directors (of which there were 19 in 2006) act as liaisons between the national office and the local churches with Brigade programs. Pioneer Girls, historically the sister ministry of Christian Service Brigade, now operates independently as Pioneer Clubs. CSB Ministries formerly operated Girls Alive, a program sponsored by local churches for girls of elementary school age, but now partners with GEMS Girls' Clubs. Christian Service Brigade's vision and mission statement are:

Vision: Godly Men Who Serve, Lead and Disciple Each Generation.

Mission: Building Godly Men of Today and Tomorrow.

== Camps ==
Camp programs are a major part of the ministry of Christian Service Brigade. Brigade camp programs are usually organized, like Brigade units, into Battalion, Stockade, and Treeclimber programs. Currently, there are about 13 camps across North America that are associated with Christian Service Brigade.

== See also ==
- Awana
- Child Evangelism Fellowship
- Child evangelism movement
- Trail Life USA
