= Klotz Digital =

German audio equipment manufacturer

Klotz Digital AG
- Company type: Public (AG)
- Industry: Audio
- Founded: 1990 in Munich, Germany
- Founder: Thomas Klotz
- Headquarters: Feldkirchen/Munich
- Products: Audio equipment
- Website: Klotz Communications GmbH

Klotz Digital AG was a manufacturer of audio media products based in Munich, Germany; it was founded in 1990 and acquired by United Screens Media AG in 2009. The company was active in the two business segments Public Address and Radio & TV Broadcast. Its products include systems for radio broadcast, television broadcast, live sound, public address, and commercial sound.

== History ==
Klotz Digital was founded in 1990 by Thomas Klotz. The company's products were first used in live sound installations and later in the 1990s found their way into broadcast facilities. In 2002 the company entered into the public address market with a digital public address product line named Varizone. The live sound, broadcast, and public address markets were the main markets for the company.

At the end of 2009, Klotz Digital AG was acquired by United Screens Media AG. Thomas Klotz resigned from his position, and Dr. Andreas Gruettner, known as CEO of United Screens Media AG, was appointed Klotz Digital’s new CEO. The company was then renamed to QPhonics AG and finally after its insolvency in 2013 turned into a company named Qphonics GmbH which went into insolvency in 2015.

Klotz Communications GmbH, the new company from Thomas Klotz and his partner Andre Sauer, has purchased the assets of the former Qphonics GmbH from the company's insolvency lawyers. Klotz Communications is now the sole owner of all intellectual property, including hardware and software, and controls all licensing, maintenance and upgrades.

== Products ==
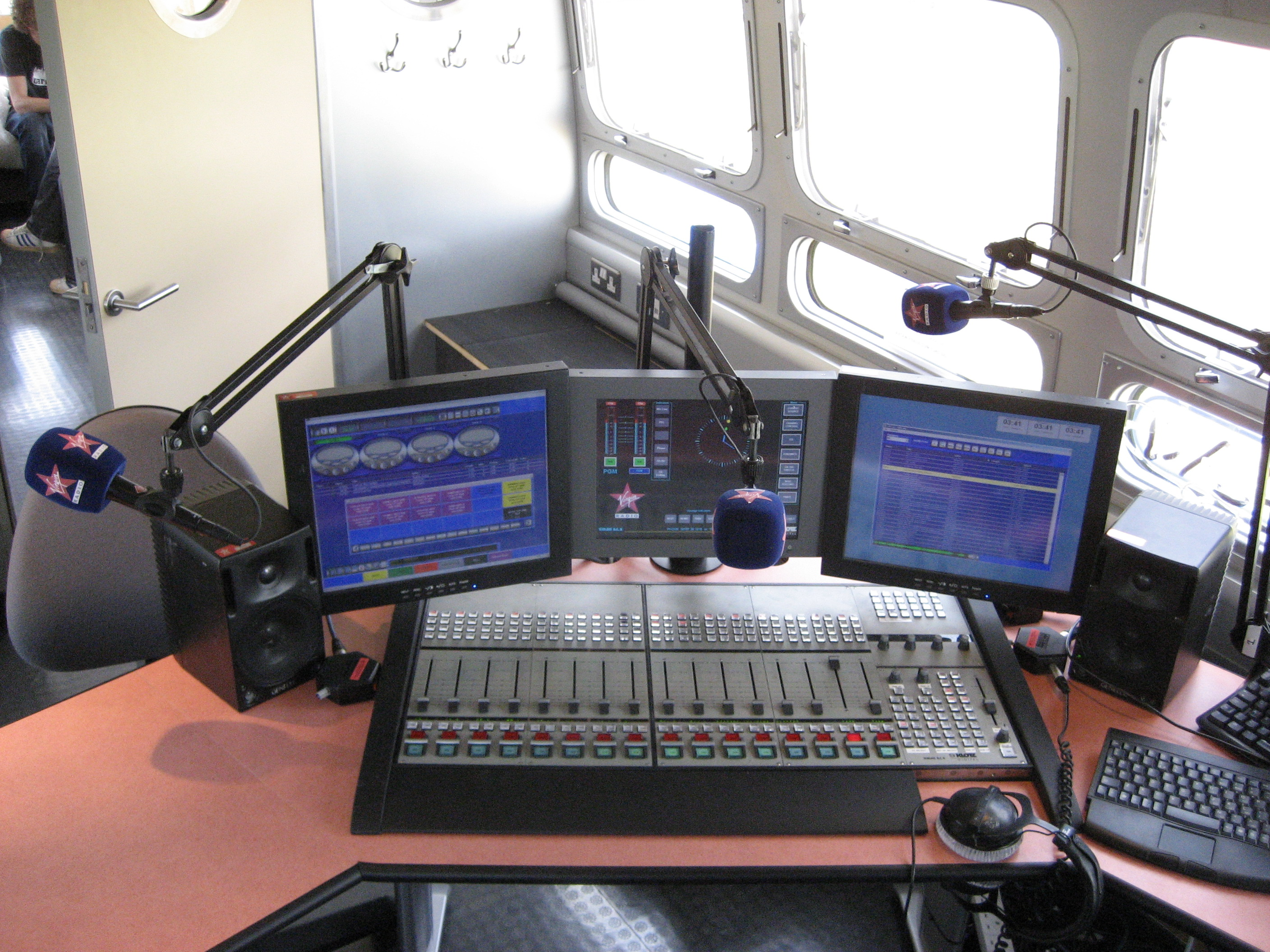
Klotz Digital's Vadis DC II mixer for use at a Virgin Radio outside broadcast at the V Festival 2007.

The broadcast products range from stand-alone on-air mixing consoles for radio and TV stations to a suite of products to enable efficient workflows in large broadcast facilities and production studios.
