= Lance Latham =

American evangelist & musician (1894–1985)

Lance Brenton Latham (1894–1985), was a prominent preacher, evangelist, youth minister, and musician in the early to mid-20th century in Chicago, Illinois. He was known to many familiar with his ministry as "Doc," and his wife Virginia was known as "Teach."

== Early life ==
Latham was a child prodigy, able to recite the entire Westminster Shorter Catechism by age 7. He was the pianist for the Chicago Gospel Tabernacle under evangelist Paul Rader. While there, Latham organized a children's ministry called the White Shirt Brigades. Through this ministry Latham developed the principles that would eventually lead to the launching of Awana.

== Career ==
Latham's ministry had a global impact. He founded the Awana Youth Association which quickly expanded to tens of thousands of clubs on every continent. Through Latham's leadership, hundreds of thousands of boys and girls in thousands of churches have engaged in Bible memory, activities, and evangelism. Latham also founded Camp Awana, a pioneer in Christian camping. Thousands of young people experienced conversions to Christ through Latham's teaching at Camp Awana, including notables such as Bill Hybels, founding pastor of Willow Creek Community Church. Latham was the founding pastor of the North Side Gospel Center, a church in Chicago. Latham's influence spread throughout the midwest and around the country.

One of the highlights of Latham's ministry was an annual Four Piano Concert. Latham, a concert-caliber pianist, arranged music for the four Steinway Grand Pianos and led an evening of inspiration and music for tens of thousands. Latham also composed numerous hymns and choruses, most notably: Only Jesus, and Blessed Calvary. He also authored "The Two Gospels".

== Death ==
Latham died in 1985.

== See also ==
- Art Rorheim
- HCJB
- Trans World Radio
- Slavic Gospel Association
- Youth for Christ
- Scripture Press
- Pacific Garden Mission
- Old Fashioned Revival Hour
- The People's Church of Toronto
- Barrington College

== Notes ==
- Latham, Lance: The Two Gospels, AWANA Clubs International, One East Bode Road, Streamwood, Illinois 60107, 1984
- Lance Latham's official biography, Lance: A Testament of Grace, was written by Dave Breese.
