= Mel Trotter =

American evangelist

Melvin Ernest Trotter (May 16, 1870–September 11, 1940) was the founder of the Grand Rapids, Michigan City Rescue Mission, which he led for more than forty years, becoming a leader in American fundamentalism during the first four decades of the twentieth century.

== Early life ==
Mel Trotter was one of seven children born in Orangeville, Illinois to a bartender who drank "as much as he served." In 1887, the family moved to Freeport, Illinois where Trotter became a barber and was shortly thereafter gambling and drinking heavily. Four years later in Pearl City, Iowa, Trotter married Lottie Fisher, who was horrified to discover that her husband was an alcoholic. Trotter later said, "I loathed the life I was living. I tried my level best, but it wasn’t in me."

Trotter lost his job in Pearl City, and he and his wife moved to a more rural area in an attempt to help him stay sober. He lost another job and they both moved to Davenport, Iowa, where Mel tried his hand at selling insurance, a job he lost the day after his son was born.

Trotter began leaving home for weeks at a time, and when he returned after one period of drunkenness, he discovered his two-year-old dead. Believing that he bore the responsibility for the child's death, he considered suicide. He stood beside the coffin and swore that he would never touch liquor again. Two hours later he was staggering drunk. Hopping a train, he landed in Chicago in January 1897 where he sold his shoes to buy another drink.

Drunk, broke, and shoeless in the snow, Trotter was nudged inside the Pacific Garden Mission, where he was converted after hearing the testimony of its director, Harry Monroe. Trotter got a barbering job and spent every night at the mission. He could play the guitar and sing, and he and Monroe represented the Mission at its supporting churches.

== Ministry ==
In 1900, Grand Rapids businessmen decided to establish a rescue mission in the city's ramshackle red-light district, and Monroe suggested Trotter—who had never even led a mission meeting—as the director. Conversions occurred at the mission almost immediately when it opened under Trotter's direction, and Trotter found he could preach and also manage the toughs who tried to disrupt the proceedings. On one occasion he had the crowd sing “More About Jesus” while he tossed the hooligans into the street.

Trotter won Herb Sillaway, another drunken barber, to Christ, and Sillaway then got drunk six times in four weeks and tried to drown himself. Trotter found him in jail in wet clothes and said nothing, just stood in front of him and wept. Sillaway said, "My God, man, I believe you love me." Trotter replied, "Yes, Herb, I love you like I love my own soul." Sillaway eventually became Trotter's assistant.

In 1905, Trotter was ordained by the Presbyterian Church, although even the ordination committee admitted that the ordination (and to some degree, Trotter's theology) was unorthodox. Within a few years, Trotter had the largest rescue mission in the United States, and in 1906, the organization purchased the local burlesque house in order to provide more space for its varied ministries.

The Mission Sunday School soon had an attendance of three to five hundred children, who were often fed and clothed as well as evangelized. By 1913, the mission held twenty-three meetings a week, and the building was in constant use twenty-four hours a day providing food, clothing, and lodging. Trotter had prison services, Bible classes and street meetings. His wife began the Martha Mission to teach women how to sew.

Trotter proved remarkably tactful to those who visited the mission, but he was a strong leader with a keen business sense and was adept at raising the necessary funds to keep the Mission doors open. Trotter also helped found dozens of rescue missions around the country, many which were headed by people whom he had trained and inspired. He was a founder of the Brotherhood of Rescue Mission Superintendents, which always held its annual meetings in January in Grand Rapids.

During World War I, Trotter and his musician friend, Homer Hammontree, entertained soldiers in American training camps for the YMCA with music proceeding Trotter's preaching. (The YMCA was required to amuse as well as minister to the soldiers, so Trotter eventually traveled with a quartet to fulfill the "entertainment" clause rather than be sandwiched between prize fights and movies.) Hammontree estimated that at the close of the war, sixteen thousand soldiers “had come out for the Lord.”

During this second decade of the twentieth century, Trotter was stricken with cancer and his wife left him. Trotter once again considered suicide.

By this time Trotter had become a popular Bible conference speaker, especially at Northfield Bible Conference and the Winona Lake Bible Conference, and by 1924, he was so well known that he finished out a Billy Sunday campaign in Memphis, Tennessee. Like Sunday, Trotter became an itinerant evangelist and had wooden tabernacles built for his campaigns. Also like Sunday, he used colloquial speech in his sermons. ("Lots of people go bugs on religion, but nobody ever went crazy on Christianity.") In 1935, Bob Jones College conferred an honorary doctorate on him. In 1937, he appeared with Harry A. Ironside in England.

In 1939, Trotter suffered a severe heart attack in Kannapolis, North Carolina, and died at his summer cottage near Holland, Michigan in 1940. Ironside was the presiding minister at his funeral. He was buried at the Graceland Mausoleum in Grand Rapids. His papers are at the Billy Graham Center, Wheaton College.

At his funeral in 1940, many of Trotter's friends described what made him a unique personality. One recalled that he would pray with an alcoholic, "then stand him on his feet and say, 'Now go home and get the wife and kiddies and come down to the Mission tonight.' Then as they parted, he would slip a dollar bill or a silver dollar in the poor drunkard's hand. I heard one of those men say, as he stood outside the Mission door, after such a parting, 'I will die before I spend this dollar for booze.'"

The mission he founded, Mel Trotter Ministries, is still operating today.

== Bibliography ==
- Leona Hertel, Man with a Mission: Mel Trotter and His Legacy for the Rescue Mission Movement (Grand Rapids: Kregel, 2000).
- Melvin E. Trotter, These Forty Years (Grand Rapids, Michigan: Zondervan Publishing House, 1939).
- Fred C. Zarfas, Mel Trotter: A Biography (Grand Rapids, Michigan: Zondervan Publishing House, 1950).
- Short biography at MelTrotter.org
