= World Radio Missionary Fellowship, Inc. =

Christian organization

Coordinates: 15°45′00″S 128°44′00″E

World Radio Missionary Fellowship, Inc., also known as Reach Beyond (formerly HCJB Global), is a corporate entity and nonprofit, noncommercial, interdenominational worldwide missionary organization with headquarters in Colorado Springs, Colorado.

== History ==
World Radio Missionary Fellowship, Inc. - Reach Beyond - began in 1931 as Radio Station HCJB in Quito, Ecuador, South America. The ministry was the vision of Clarence W. Jones, a musician, graduate of Moody Bible Institute, and the son of a Salvation Army minister. Following his graduation from Moody, Jones worked under evangelist Paul Rader and was part of the founding staff of the Chicago Gospel Tabernacle where Jones assisted in leading music, working with youth and overseeing Rader's weekly radio ministry called "WJBT" (Where Jesus Blesses Thousands) Impressed by the impact Rader's radio ministry had made, Jones felt called to establish missionary radio in Latin America. As a result, Jones traveled to Venezuela, Colombia, Panama and Cuba on a seven-week trip in 1928 looking for a suitable location for his envisioned radio station, but was unable to obtain the necessary government permits. Back in Chicago nearly two years later, Jones met Christian & Missionary Alliance (C&MA) missionaries from Ecuador - Reuben and Grace Larson, John and Ruth Clark and Paul and Bernice Young. These missionaries encouraged Jones to consider Ecuador as the place to start his missionary radio station.

As the first step in fulfilling his vision, Jones needed to obtain a contract of approval from the Ecuadorian government for setting up the radio station. Reuben Larson and D. Stuart Clark, along with Ecuadorian lawyer Luís Calisto, worked to procure the initial contract. On August 15, 1930, the Ecuadorian Congress approved a bill which granted Jones a 25-year contract to operate a radio station in the country.

As with all countries having a governing body over broadcast operations, the call letters HCJB were obtained through the government of Ecuador, beginning with the internationally allocated prefix for Ecuador's broadcast stations (HC). Station co-founders Jones and Larson advocated for, and were granted by the government, call letters that were an acronym indicative of the stations' agreed upon purpose. The result was Heralding Christ Jesus' Blessings. In Spanish (one of the original broadcast languages of the South American station) the call letters represent Hoy Cristo Jesús Bendice.

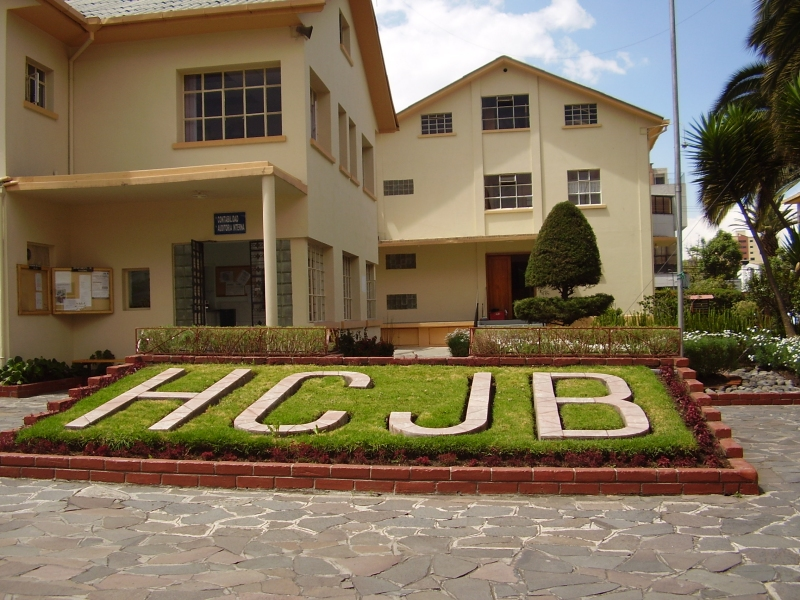
The grounds of radio station HCJB in Quito, Ecuador

Jones incorporated the World Radio Missionary Fellowship, Inc. (WRMF) on March 9, 1931 as a non-profit entity and overseeing organization over HCJB. Jones was also the non-profit corporation's first president. The corporation's first officers were Adam Welty as treasurer, Ruth Churchill, secretary, and Lance Latham and his wife, Virginia, along with Howard Jones and Reuben Larson serving on the board of directors.

HCJB's first broadcast on Christmas Day, 1931 had the potential of being heard by the six radio receivers capable of receiving the program and existing in the country at the time. The inaugural program was broadcast in English and Spanish from a studio in the Joneses' living room and powered by a 200-watt, table-top transmitter. The antenna used was a simple, single-wire antenna strung between two makeshift telephone poles. The broadcast lasted 30 minutes.

== The mission expands ==
As the mission of Radio Station HCJB grew with missionaries signing on for service in Ecuador, Jones and Larson realized a need for doctors and nurses who would also work as missionaries to care for the mission’s staff and employees. It was also decided that the same missionary medical staff would be available to attend to the needs of indigenous, Ecuadorian people who passed near the station. The first medical staff arrived in 1949, opening a small shelter and clinic. In 1955, a fully equipped modern hospital, now known as "Hospital Vozandes-Quito," became a reality through the gifts and offerings of American listeners to “Morning Cheer," a Christian radio program broadcast from Philadelphia, Pennsylvania.

With the addition of Everett Fuller, M.D. to HCJB’s medical work in 1950, Nate Saint, a young missionary working in the eastern jungle of Ecuador and affiliated with Mission Aviation Fellowship, enlisted the help of Dr. Fuller for the implementation of a medical hospital near the MAF's base at Shell Mera. Hospital Vozandes-Shell was completed in 1958 largely through gifts from listeners to the “Back to the Bible” radio program. Within time, HCJB's medical ministries extended beyond established hospitals to mobile medical clinics, potable water projects and urban clinics.

HCJB launched World Radio Network in the United States in 1978. It became an affiliated organization in 2005 and broadcasts under the names Inspiracom and Manantial.

== Organizational structure ==
World Radio Missionary Fellowship, Inc. was officially incorporated on March 9, 1931 with Clarence Jones as the corporation's first president. At the time of the WRMF's incorporation, corporation officers were Adam Welty as treasurer, Ruth Churchill, secretary, and Lance Latham and his wife, Virginia along with Howard Jones and Reuben Larson serving on the board of directors. Since 1931, WRMF/HCJB Global has had seven presidents overseeing the ministry: co-founder Clarence W. Jones; co-founder Reuben Larson; co-founder D.S. Clark; Abe C. Van Der Puy; Ronald A. Cline; David Johnson; Wayne Pederson; Rev. Steve Harling became President of Reach Beyond on Sept. 1, 2016.

== Goals ==
Mission Statement: Serving with global partners as the voice and hands of Jesus.

Mission Vision: To partner with Christians in media and healthcare to bring the voice and hands of Jesus to the unreached peoples of the world.

Key Distinctive: The dynamic integration of media (HCJB Global Voice) and healthcare (HCJB Global Hands) around the world to impact lives for Christ.

== Ministries ==
Although HCJB began solely as a radio ministry, in recent decades it has diversified substantially with outreaches in healthcare and education as HCJB Global.

- HCJB Global Hands, the mission's healthcare outreach, operates a wide variety of medical ministries. Hospital Vozandes-Quito, founded in 1955. As of 2010 this hospital has 76 beds.

HCJB Global Hands is now branching out beyond Ecuador and Latin America, joining with medical partners in countries such as Malawi, the Republic of Congo, Ghana and South Africa. In recent years the mission has also sent short-term emergency medical teams to Indonesia, Pakistan, Lebanon, Peru, Mexico, Haiti and the Solomon Islands to help in relief efforts following various natural and man-made disasters.

- Hospital Vozandes-Shell (Hospital Vozandes del Oriente), located in the jungle town of Shell, has provided medical services to the people of Ecuadorian Amazon since 1958. This 30-bed hospital works in close association with a ministry called Mission Aviation Fellowship which often flies patients to the hospital from the surrounding, otherwise inaccessible, communities.
- Vozandes Community Development is responsible for projects in needy areas around Ecuador. These include clean water projects which aim at ensuring rural communities have access to pure water supplies, mobile medical clinics that travel to remote communities about once a month to provide dental and medical services. All of these ministries attempt to provide medical aid to those who need it while presenting a clear Christian gospel message. In 2009 HCJB Global Hands served nearly 330,000 Ecuadorians.

Underlying nearly all of HCJB Global's ministries is education. Radio training is held in all five of the mission's regions.

- The Christian Center of Communications (CCC) is a three-year higher education program based in Quito, Ecuador, that teaches Spanish-speaking students about radio, television and the print media. It is an accredited branch campus of Northwestern College in Roseville, Minnesota and is also accredited by Ecuadorian authorities. The mission announced recently that the school will close in 2013 after last year's freshman class graduates.
- Apoyo (Spanish for "support"), is an outreach that focuses on evangelism, developing the local church and equipping Latin American church leaders to be pastors. This ministry, which began in 1992, began as a cooperative effort of HCJB Global and Leadership Resources International, but is now operated solely by HCJB Global. One of Apoyo's key projects is an intensive three-year program that trains national church leaders so they can teach others in their own countries.
- The Christian Academy of the Air (formerly called Bible Institute of the Air) is operated by the World Radio Network, a cooperating ministry based in Texas. This outreach, dating back more than 50 years, focuses on teaching a wide range of classes centered on the Bible, theology and Christian ministry.
- The Global Voice Institute (formerly the Radio School of Mission), first held in Singapore in 2005, is a weeklong course that provides training to broadcasters from across the Asia Pacific Region. Radio School of Mission II is the more advanced course. Radio seminars are also held in Euro-Asia, Sub-Saharan Africa and North Africa/Middle East.
- Corrientes (Spanish for "currents"), is a coalition of Christian ministries led by HCJB Global that officially launched on October 3, 2009. This training program unifies ministries in a shared goal of mentoring bi-vocational Latin Americans for Christian service around the world.

== See also ==
Related topics

Missionary related

- Mission Aviation Fellowship

Broadcasting related

- Shortwave listening
