= Boundary microphone =

Microphone for use on or near a surface

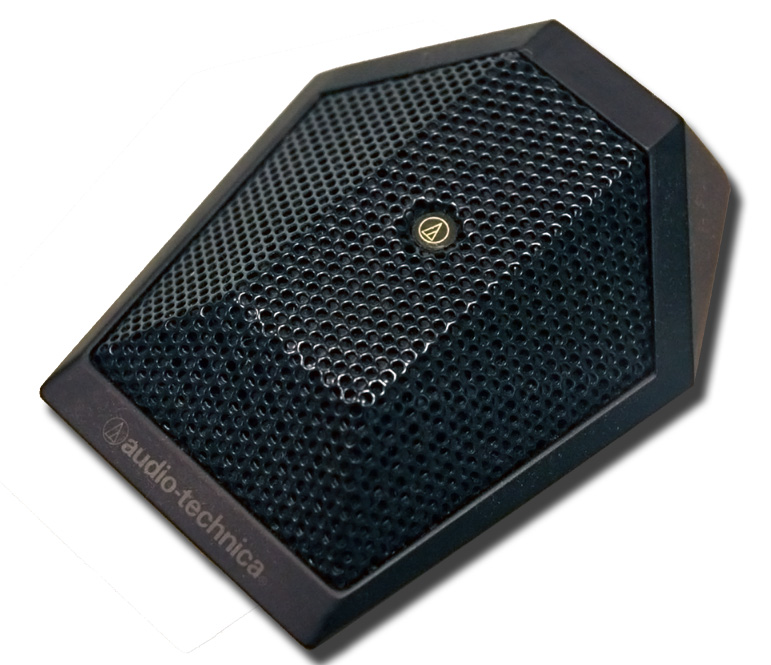
Boundary microphone (Audio-Technica ATM87R)

A boundary microphone (or pressure zone microphone) is one or more small omnidirectional or cardioid condenser mic capsule(s) positioned near or flush with a boundary (surface) such as a floor, table, or wall. The capsule(s) is/are typically mounted in a flat plate or housing. The arrangement provides a directional half-space pickup pattern while delivering a relatively phase-coherent output signal.

The boundary microphone can be used as a piano mic by placing it inside the piano lid, an approach which can obtain better pickup of the piano's mix of sharp percussive transients and gentle undertones than other microphone options. Boundary mics are used on hockey boards for body check sound effects. They are also commonly used to record full room sound, such as in a conference room, by being mounted on a wall or table. When used to record a soloist or small musical ensemble along with the room acoustics (e.g. reverberation), a boundary microphone prevents phase interference between direct and reflected sound, resulting in a natural sound with a flatter frequency response than can be obtained with a stand-mounted microphone at the same distance (explanation below).

Boundary mics are usually less expensive than other mics, although there is nonetheless a range of price points that varies, depending on the number of capsules and the absence or presence of additional features, such as on-off switches, wireless capabilities, and levers to reposition the capsule(s). As they are condenser mics, they need power. Boundary mics have a relatively flat profile, they have the advantage of being less visually obtrusive, such as when they are placed in a conference table or the floor or a musical theater stage. At the same time, the placement of the mic on a table or floor may increase the likelihood of unwanted sounds from contact of items or body parts on those hard surfaces.

== Development and function ==
In the early 20th century, physicist Ludwig Prandtl studied air movement and aerodynamic forces between air (or fluid) and an object. On August 8, 1904, he delivered a groundbreaking paper, Über Flüssigkeitsbewegung bei sehr kleiner Reibung (On the Motion of Fluids in Very Little Friction), at the Third International Mathematics Congress in Heidelberg. In this paper, he described the boundary layer and its importance for drag and streamlining. The paper also described flow separation as a result of the boundary layer. He discovered that some molecules of air "stick" to the object. The place right next to the object was called the "boundary layer", because it was between the object (no movement of air) and the free-flowing stream of air beyond it.

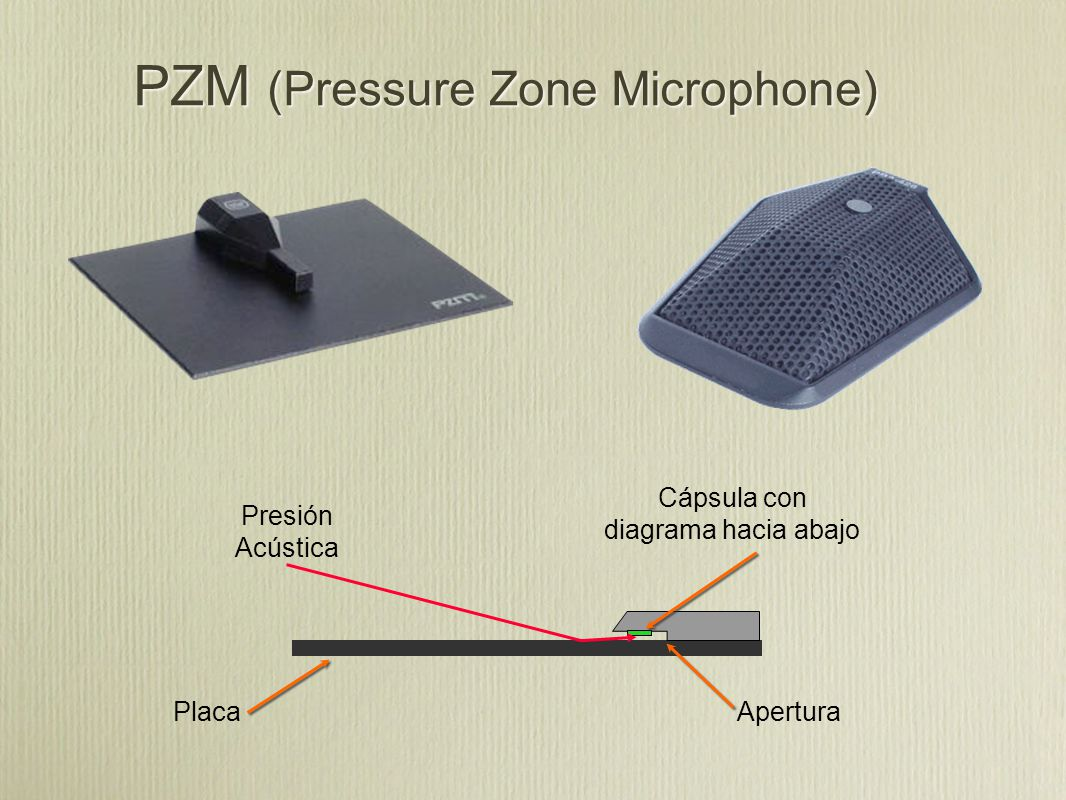
Two examples of different boundary mics (top) and a diagram of the elements of a boundary microphone. The diagram shows the location of the mic capsule, the plate, the aperture, and the pressure zone.

A conventional microphone placed on, or a few inches above, a hard boundary surface will pick up the desired direct sound as well as delayed sound reflecting off the boundary surface. The direct and delayed reflected sounds will combine at the microphone to create comb filtering, with constructive and destructive interference causing peaks and valleys in the frequency response. The delay time of the reflection for most microphones would be in the range of 0.1 to 1 milliseconds, corresponding to cancellation frequencies of a few kilohertz and octave multiples. Since these frequencies are audible, the cancellation effects are also audible and are said to "color" the resulting audio signals. An approach was described by Roger Anderson and Bob Schulein in 1971 using a microphone stand to place the microphone near the floor Another implementation of this approach was patented in 1973 by Lou Burroughs of ElectroVoice

In 1978, audio engineers Ed Long and Ron Wickersham studied the effects of the boundary layer in sound recording. In a study of flush-mounted microphones, they realized if the mic is only a few millimeters away from a large surface, there is a boost in coherence of sound signals, as they are still in phase after being stopped at the boundary. The point where the waves were stopped at the boundary was called a "pressure field" or "pressure zone". They also noted that using a mic in this set-up leads to a six dB boost in sound pressure, and improved uniformity of response Only two years after Long and Wickersham's patent application, in 1980 Crown Audio developed and marketed the first boundary mic.

By placing the diaphragm of the microphone capsule parallel to and facing the plate boundary provided by the microphone package, the reflected sound delay is reduced, and the resulting comb filter interference frequencies are high enough that they are outside the audible range.

The terms "boundary microphone" and "pressure zone microphone" (or PZM) refer to the same general design. PZM is a trademarked by Crown. Crown's trademark on this approach is "Phase Coherent Cardioid" or "PCC," but there are other makers who employ this technique as well. Radio Shack and Tandy also use the PZM term for their particular design of a boundary mic, in which the condenser capsule was positioned slightly higher than the base plate. One 1986 source uses the alternate term "barrier microphone" to refer to the boundary microphone approach.

=== Variant features ===
Since one of the benefits of boundary microphones is that they are less visually obtrusive, they may be available in several colors, to enable audio engineers to select the color that will blend best with the surface they will be placed on or mounted on, in order to further reduce the mic's visual obtrusiveness. Some boundary mics come with a paint mask to facilitate the custom painting of the housing. Custom painting can be used to provide an exact color match with a wall, in cases where the building architects wish there to be minimal visual impact (e.g. a historical church or a Classical music stage).

The housing also varies according to the intended usage. A model intended to be placed on a tabletop does not have to be that heavy-duty, as it is in a place where it is relatively safe from impacts. On the other hand, a boundary mic intended for use on a music theater stage is much more likely to face impacts (e.g. being stepped on), so it needs a robust, thick steel casing. Another variation on housing is the size. When concealing the mic is important, such as with film production, a smaller housing may be desirable. Sanken's CUB-01 boundary microphone has a 32 mm diameter and 12 mm height, which makes it easier to hide in TV and film field shooting and easier to reposition or temporarily mount in locations (e.g. taping it onto the inside ceiling of a car).

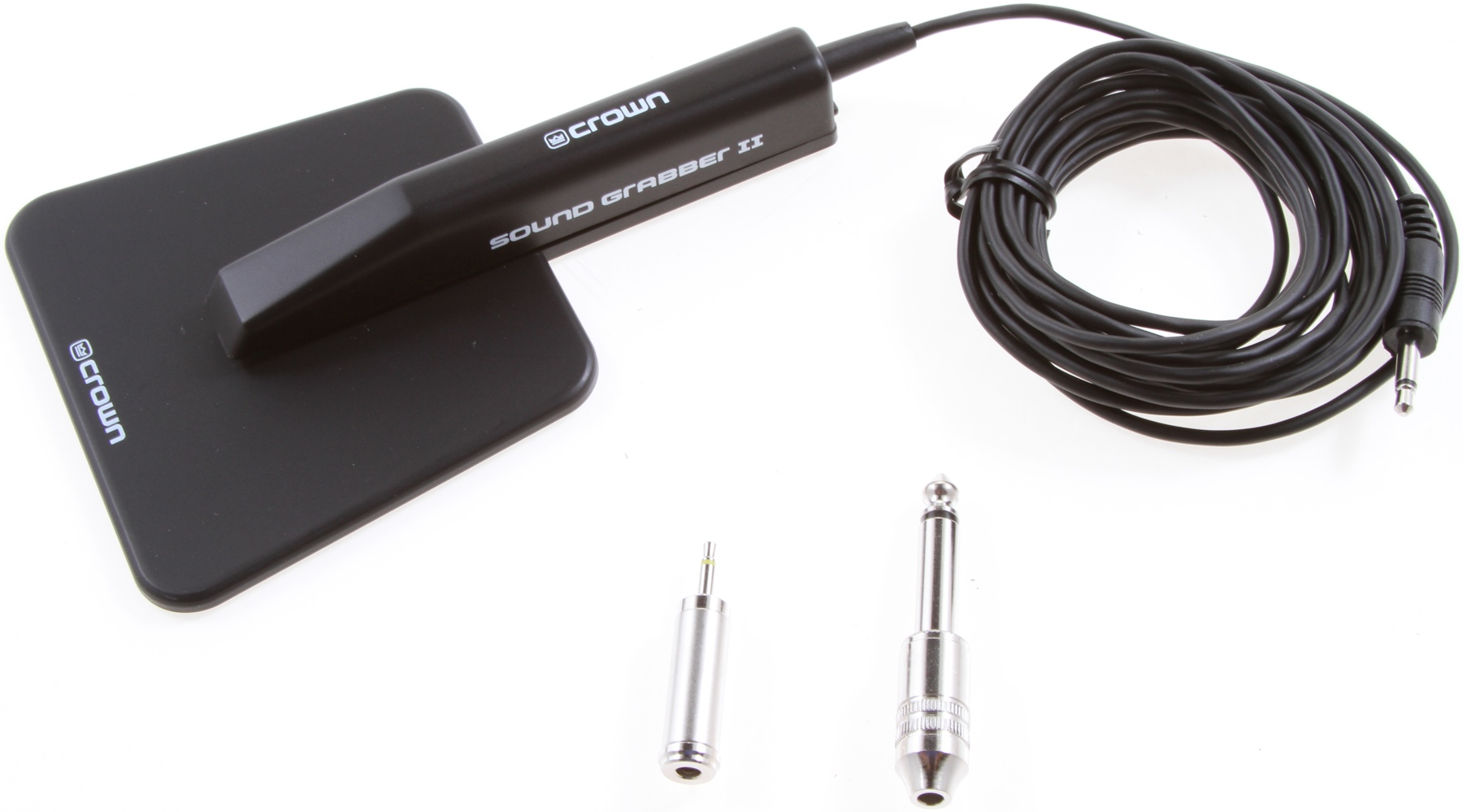
A Crown Audio brand PZM, the "Sound Grabber II". It is shown with adapters to enable it to be connected to different mixers and audio devices. The mic has an internal battery so that it can be used with consumer audio devices that do not supply phantom power.

Boundary mics may have XLR or 1/4" TRS jacks. Some use mini-XLR or 1/8" TRS jacks. Some boundary mics have a "bass roll-off" switch, to reduce boominess in the low frequency range, such as in cases where the mic will be used to pick up speech. The Crown PZM-30D has a switchable filter that allows you to switch between a flat response or a “brighter” sound. Gold Line's CBM1 boundary microphone and Crown's "Sound Grabber II" have an internal battery to power the condenser.

Schoeps' BLM 3 boundary microphone is unusual in that it has a "pressure transducer" capsule that provides a hemispherical pickup pattern.

AKG's PZM11 is a weather-resistant boundary microphone. It can be installed outdoors in places such as fast-food restaurant drive-through lanes, toll road booths, and security intercoms. It has a plastic membrane that keeps rainwater away from the capsule.

== Directional boundary microphone ==
A directional boundary microphone is a boundary microphone with a directional polar pattern such as cardioid or supercardioid. One method to create a directional boundary mic is to mount panels (hard surfaces) next to an omnidirectional mic capsule.

Another method to create a directional boundary mic is to use a small-diameter (1 cm or less) directional mic capsule mounted on a boundary surface, with the axis of the microphone parallel with the surface. As shown on manufacturers' datasheets, the mic capsule retains its directionality (cardioid or supercardioid polar pattern) and prevents comb filtering by keeping phase interference above the audible range.

Examples include:

- Crown Audio PCC-160 introduced in January 1985.
- Shure SM-91, which is also commonly used inside a kick drum for sound reinforcement.
- Audio-Technica U843R, which has three cardioid condenser elements in the same housing plate, which allows for multiple, user-selected pickup patterns (levers allow the reorientation of the capsules; as well, individual capsules can be turned on or off).

The predecessor of the directional boundary microphone was a directional microphone placed in an Electrovoice Mic Mouse, a foam block that suspended a conventional microphone horizontally just above a surface. Because conventional microphone diaphragms are relatively large (> 1 cm diameter), phase interference from surface sound reflections caused a rolloff in the high frequencies of a microphone in a Mic Mouse.

Some applications for directional boundary mics are picking up actors' voices onstage in drama or musicals; picking up the footwork of dance troupes; picking up speech at conference tables, boardrooms, and the pulpit in a church; and recording small musical ensembles or soloists.

Boundary mics intended for boardroom use may have a range of additional features that are helpful in a conference setting, such as an "on" indicator LED, an on-off switch (or a "push to talk" or "mute" button), and wireless capability to allow easy repositioning during the event.

== Use in other fields ==
Boundary microphones are also used to produce more uniform results in acoustic measurement, compared to measurements with microphones elevated above the surface. Based on work by W. L. Willshire at NASA the method was adopted for noise certification of small propeller-driven airplanes, and standardized as SAE ARP4055. A variant of this approach is also used to measure the noise from wind turbines
