= Crown International =

American audio equipment manufacturer

- Industry: Audio electronics
- Founded: 1947 (as International Radio and Electronics Corporation)
- Founder: Clarence C. Moore
- Headquarters: Los Angeles, CA, United States
- Products: power amplifiers microphones preamplifiers compact audio mixers audio networking products
- Owner: Samsung Electronics
- Parent: Harman International Industries
- Website: www.crownaudio.com

Crown International, or Crown Audio, is an American manufacturer of audio electronics, and is a subsidiary of Harman International Industries, which has been part of South Korea-based Samsung Electronics since 2017. Today, the company is known primarily for its power amplifiers, but has also manufactured microphones, loudspeakers, and a line of commercial audio products, as well as digital audio networking products.

== History ==
International Radio and Electronics Corporation (IREC) was established in 1947 by Clarence C. Moore, an Elkhart, Indiana minister. The company started out building rugged, reel-to-reel audio tape recorders for use by missionaries in far-off parts of the world. A converted chicken coop served as the first manufacturing facility.

In the 1960s, the company's name was changed to "Crown International", as suggested by Moore's wife and co-founder, Ruby, as she felt the name "International Radio and Electronics Corporation" was too long, and because the emblem on many of their tape recorders was a crown. In 1975, the company's name was changed to Crown International, Inc., as voted by the stockholders.

A fire destroyed 60% of the Crown facility on Thanksgiving Day 1971 and rendered much of the remaining building severely damaged. US$1 million of uninsured assets were lost. The plant was rebuilt, and D-60 amplifier production was brought back on line within six weeks.

In March, 2000, Crown International was acquired by Harman International as their primary supplier of audio power amplifiers. The radio frequency broadcast division was subsequently repurchased by descendants of Clarence Moore who restructured the division in order to continue the manufacture of broadcast transmitters and RF amplifiers using Moore's original firm name: "International Radio & Electronics Corporation". Following Crown International's acquisition by Harman International, additional offices were set up in Northridge, Los Angeles, California, where AKG Acoustics, another Harman company, maintains its North American headquarters.

In June, 2018, Harman International shut down the Crown International headquarters in Elkhart, IN and moved manufacturing to Mexico in an effort to consolidate resources.

== Product timeline ==
In 1947, Clarence and Ruby Moore began by modifying existing makes and models of tape recorders to make them more rugged. In 1949, Moore obtained a groundbreaking patent, the first tape recorder with a built-in power amplifier for public address duties, which was introduced in 1950. In 1953, Crown added a line of compact loudspeakers as accessories to the reel-to-reel tape recorders.

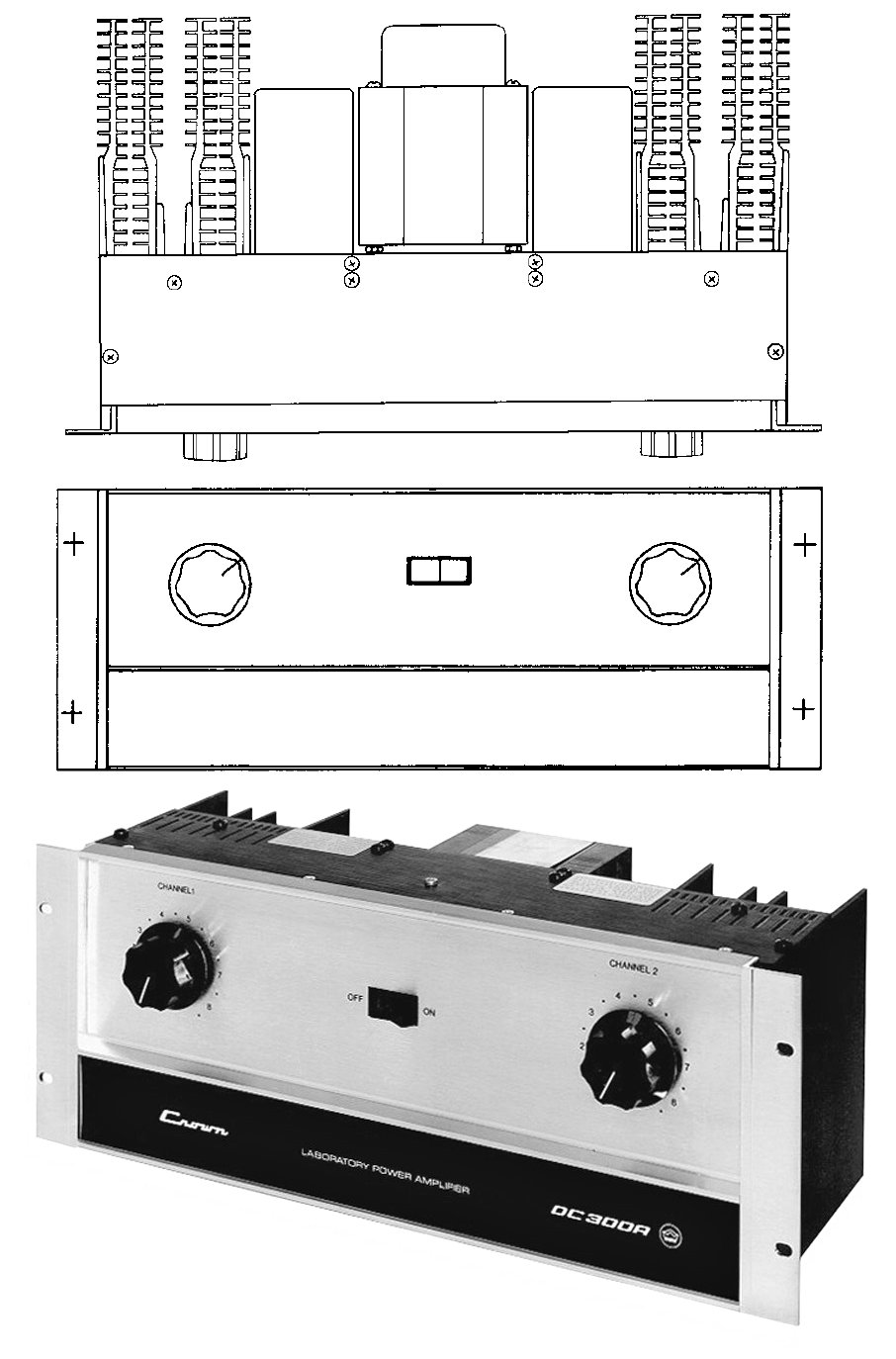
The Crown DC300, introduced in 1967, helped define the era of modern power amplifiers

In 1959, Crown began making standalone tube power amplifiers. By 1963, solid state electronics development allowed Crown to produce a more robust tape recorder, and in 1964, their first solid state power amplifier: the low-profile SA 20-20. In 1967, the DC300 was introduced as the first AB+B circuitry amplifier with 150 watts per channel at eight ohms. The DC300 proved very popular with sound reinforcement system owners and moved Crown into a leadership position in terms of power amplifier sales worldwide. As well, the DC300 was seen as a breakthrough product by commercial sound system contractors seeking to power their constant-voltage speaker systems without the frequency response limitations and power losses associated with output power transformers which had previously been required. In November 2007, after 40 years of service, the Crown DC300 was inducted into the TEC Awards TECnology Hall of Fame in New York on the opening day of the Audio Engineering Society's 123rd convention. George Peterson, executive editor of Mix magazine, said of the DC300 that it "was a classic that really ushered in and defined the era of the modern power amplifier."

In 1971, the grounded bridge amplifier design was invented by Crown, allowing greater output power without increasing amplifier size and also gave lower distortion, less thermal stress and greater reliability. The first grounded bridge product released by Crown was the M600 amplifier (1974), primarily employed for commercial sound installations including constant voltage loudspeaker systems. Crown received a patent for the invention in 1974. After proving itself in the field, the topology was used to design the Microtech MT-1000 in 1984. Further development of the grounded bridge yielded the Macrotech line, which set a new standard for touring sound reinforcement in 1992 with the MA-5000VZ.

In 1976, Crown patented the synergistic equalizer, releasing the stereo EQ-2 graphic equalizer which used a combination of shelving filters and eleven active frequency adjustment faders per channel. The faders were connected to constant bandwidth, variable Q, 1/2-octave filters placed on octave centers but with adjustable frequency knobs to shift the center frequency for greater flexibility. A limited number of units were sold to audiophiles and audio researchers.

By 1977, all of Crown's tape recorder products had been phased out.

In 1979, Crown introduced the PSA-2 & SA-2 power amplifiers with analog computer control of transistor performance to maximize output characteristics. The FM-1 stereo radio tuner was praised at the Consumer Electronics Show. In 1981, the FM-2 with digital tuning was released.

To complement its line of audiophile power amplifiers, Crown introduced a companion line of electrostatic loudspeakers in 1973, namely the ES224, the ES212, the ES26 and the ES14. The ES224 featured 24 bidirectional electrostatic radiators and two 10-inch (250 mm) woofers, with crossover at 350 Hz. The ES212 was similar but with 12 radiators and crossover at 375 Hz. The ES26 featured 6 radiators with two 10-inch woofers, and the ES14 had 4 radiators with one 10-inch woofer, both with crossovers at 1500 Hz. The large subwoofers, in conjunction with the electrostatic panels, provided audio response stated variously as 22-30 Hz up to 30 kHz. The ES224 was originally-priced at $2,330/pair; the ES212 at $1,200/pair; the ES26 at $990/pair; and the ES14 at $670/pair. These four high end electrostatic models, and two mid-range models (the C-4 and the C-8) were sometimes referenced as the "Auralinear" line of loudspeakers.

A line of Pressure zone microphones (PZM) was introduced by Crown in 1980, culminating in the PZM-30 series in 1990. Other microphones introduced by Crown included the PCC-160 directional boundary microphone in 1986, the tiny GLM series and the patented Differoid CM310 in 1987. The microphone technique that was later referred to as Stereo Ambient Sample System (SASS), a stereo microphone array using boundary technology, was patented by Crown in 1987. Garth Brooks was the first performer to wear the Crown CM311A headset microphone in 1993. The CM700 studio condenser was introduced in 1995.

Some Crown products were sold for export labeled with the Amcron, rather than the Crown, brand.
