= Constant-voltage speaker system =

Network of loudspeakers connected using transformers

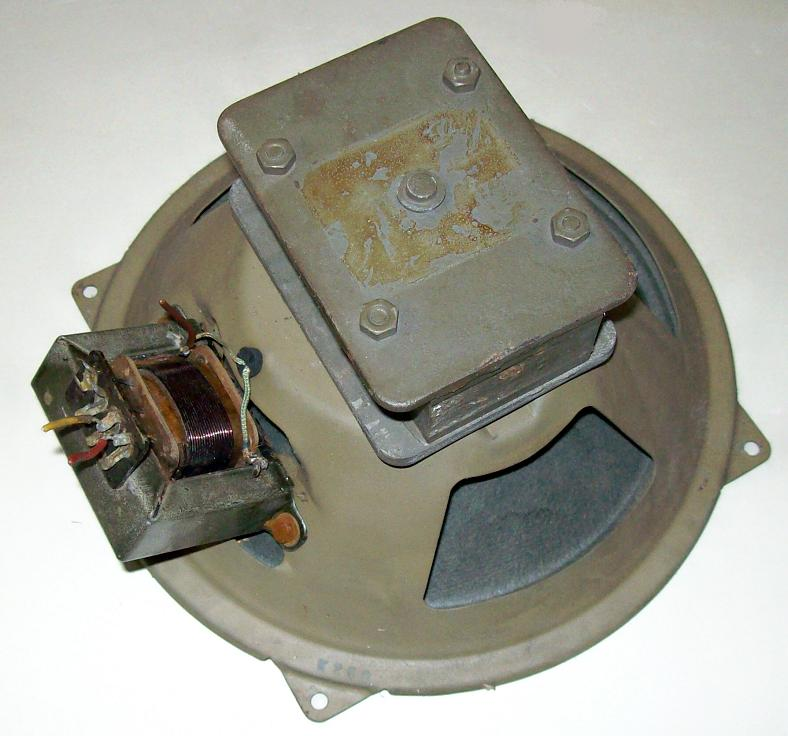
Loudspeaker with attached step-down transformer for use on a constant-voltage system

Constant-voltage speaker systems refer to networks of loudspeakers which are connected to an audio amplifier using step-up and step-down transformers to simplify impedance calculations and to minimize power loss over the speaker cables. They are more appropriately called high-voltage audio distribution systems. The voltage is constant only in the sense that at full power, the voltage in the system does not depend on the number of speakers driven (as long the amplifier's maximum power is not exceeded). Constant-voltage speaker systems are also commonly referred to as 25-, 70-, 70.7-, 100 or 210-volt speaker systems; distributed speaker systems; or high-impedance speaker systems. In Canada and the US, they are most commonly referred to as 70-volt speakers. In Europe, the 100 V system is the most widespread, with amplifier and speaker products being simply labeled with 100 V.

== Operation ==
Constant-voltage speaker systems are analogous to electrical power transmission methods employed by electric utility companies to transmit electric power over long distances. Typically, an electric utility will step up the voltage of the power transmitted, which correspondingly reduces the current, hence reducing the power loss during transmission. The voltage is stepped down at the destination. Similarly, in a constant-voltage speaker system, the amplifier uses a transformer to step up the voltage of the audio signal to reduce power loss over the speaker cable, allowing more power to be transmitted over a given wire diameter. Each speaker in the system has a step-down transformer to reduce the voltage to a usable level.

== Loudspeaker connection ==
Each loudspeaker's step-down transformer can be designed for a single power level or it can have multiple taps, one of which is selected to match the desired power level to be applied to the loudspeaker. Transformers with various taps allow the installer to adjust the sound pressure level up or down at an individual loudspeaker. Purpose-built models are available that have the transformer contained within the loudspeaker enclosure. The loudspeaker step-down transformer primary is connected in parallel to the constant-voltage line.

== Amplifier connection ==
Constant-voltage lines can be driven by a conventional amplifier with external step-up transformer, an amplifier with an internal step-up transformer, or a high-voltage amplifier with transformerless output.

=== External step-up transformer ===
A general-purpose amplifier with typical low-impedance output is used. Its output is connected to the primary of an external step-up transformer. Special-purpose transformers can tailor the system design to the project's target power levels. Multiple amplifiers can be combined together via transformers to yield higher voltage and higher current capacity lines. For instance, three 70-volt amplifiers have been used to make a 210-volt line by connecting them to a special-purpose external output transformer that has three primaries and a single secondary.

=== Internal step-up transformer ===
Amplifiers with built-in 70-volt output transformers are available with low impedance and high-impedance output connections, the latter typically labeled "25 V" and "70 V". These are robust, purpose-built amplifiers with many application-specific design features such as overcurrent protection and aggressive high-pass filtering for flyback voltage protection. Some models can be configured so that one channel drives one or two low impedance 8-ohm speakers while the other drives a constant-voltage string of speakers.

=== High voltage transformerless ===
With advances in power semiconductors, it became possible to output high voltage directly from the output stage of the amplifier. For example, in 1967, Crown International introduced the DC300 amplifier, which is capable of directly driving 70-volt lines, as well as traditional speaker loads, thanks to its overall power of 500W. In 1987, Crown introduced the Macrotech 2400, capable of driving 100-volt lines directly. Since then, further developments in high-power amplifier technology have widened the choices. Many manufacturers make amplifiers capable of direct connection to a high-impedance constant-voltage speaker line. High-voltage audio amplifiers have almost become a one-chip solution. For example, National Semiconductor's LME49810 (and similar products LME49811 and LME49830) can output 100 V peak to peak signals, but have relatively low current output, so a standard circuit includes a Darlington or FET discrete output stage.

== Higher power levels ==
High-voltage constant-voltage systems can be designed to use 140-, 200- and 210-volt lines, depending on the transformers selected and the amplifier connection topology. Such high voltage systems have been used in locations where small diameter wire is already in place, where long-distance wire runs are involved and at especially loud installations such as Daytona International Speedway and the Indianapolis Motor Speedway prior to its redesign in 2003. Safety considerations in such high voltages require speaker line installation within conduit in most of the world.

600-watt transformers are widely available for contractors needing high-power loudspeakers in constant-voltage installations. Special-purpose transformers capable of handling 1250 watts down as low as 50 Hz are available. One problem with high-power, high-current transformers is that fewer can be used on a single constant-voltage line. Larger diameter speaker wire is recommended. Larger transformers needed for high power handling have reduced high-frequency response.

== Alternatives ==
The traditional alternative to constant-voltage speaker systems are low impedance speaker systems (commonly referred to as 8-ohm speaker systems in spite of the fact that their impedance may not be 8 ohms), in which the amplifier and speaker are directly coupled without the use of transformers. The disadvantages relative to constant-voltage systems are that speaker cables need to be shorter or larger in diameter and that more amplifiers are needed if different listening levels are desired at different locations.

Another alternative is powered speakers with an amplifier built into the speaker enclosure. Since the amplifier is at the same location as the speaker, the speaker requires only a line level audio signal as an input. Line-level signals are typically around 1-2 volts, and can be transmitted over much smaller cable (typically 20-26 AWG). The main disadvantage of powered loudspeakers is that they have the additional requirement of requiring AC power, whereas passive speakers have no such requirement.

== Advantages ==
The main advantages of using a constant-voltage speaker system over a conventional low impedance speaker system are:

- Multiple loudspeakers: Many loudspeakers can be driven by a single amplifier without complex series/parallel connection schemes.
- Multiple power levels: Different sound pressure level targets can be achieved at different listening areas while still using a single amplifier.
- Less expensive: Since the voltage of the signal has been stepped up and the current is relatively low, lighter, less expensive cable can be used without incurring additional power loss. Where a typical 8-ohm speaker system might require 12 gauge cable, a 70-volt system could use 18-gauge or smaller cable.
- System expansion: A 70-volt system can be expanded easily.
- Easy volume adjustment: A passive volume control may be installed to give the user easy level control over a single loudspeaker or a multiple-speaker zone.

== Disadvantages ==
- Frequency Response: Inexpensive transformers may have poor reproduction of low and high frequencies.
- Distortion: Overdriven transformers can add ringing distortion to the audio signal. Low-cost transformers are prone to distortion at higher power levels, especially with regard to low-frequency response. Low-level signals can fail to energize a poorly designed transformer core enough to prevent higher than normal amounts of harmonic distortion.
- Variation: Unit-to-unit variation can be observed in poorly made transformers.
- Delay: More distant speakers on the same constant-voltage line cannot be delayed to match the speed of sound in air to make the impulses from a string of loudspeakers arrive at the same time from the point of view of a distant listener.
- Insertion loss: The transformers themselves commonly reduce total power applied to the loudspeakers, requiring the amplifier to be some 10% to 20% more powerful than the total power that is intended to be applied to the loudspeakers. Typical transformer insertion loss measurements are taken at 1,000 Hz to optimize the transformer's specifications. Using this method, typical insertion losses are about 1 dB, a 20% power loss. Most of the power in voice-application audio systems is below 400 Hz, meaning that insertion loss at lower frequencies would be greater. The best transformers reduce mid-band frequencies by 0.5 dB (approximately 10% power loss) or less, resulting in a 10-watt loudspeaker drawing 11.1 watts from the amplifier.
- Capacitance: To achieve higher power levels, transformers must be physically larger. Large transformers (above 200 watts) begin to suffer from high-frequency attenuation due to self-capacitance.
- More expensive: If high-power loudspeakers are used with an emphasis on low frequency response, the required transformers will be much larger and will add significant cost to the project. In some areas, building and electrical codes require 70-volt cabling to be carried within conduit, increasing the project cost.
- More sensitive: Since constant-voltage systems operate at relatively high impedances, they are more sensitive to small amounts of leakage current and partial short circuits. Running 70-volt speaker lines in conduit that collects water can result in crackling sounds in the system.
