= Pacific Garden Mission =

Homeless shelter in Chicago, Illinois

Coordinates: 41.8620°N 87.6398°W

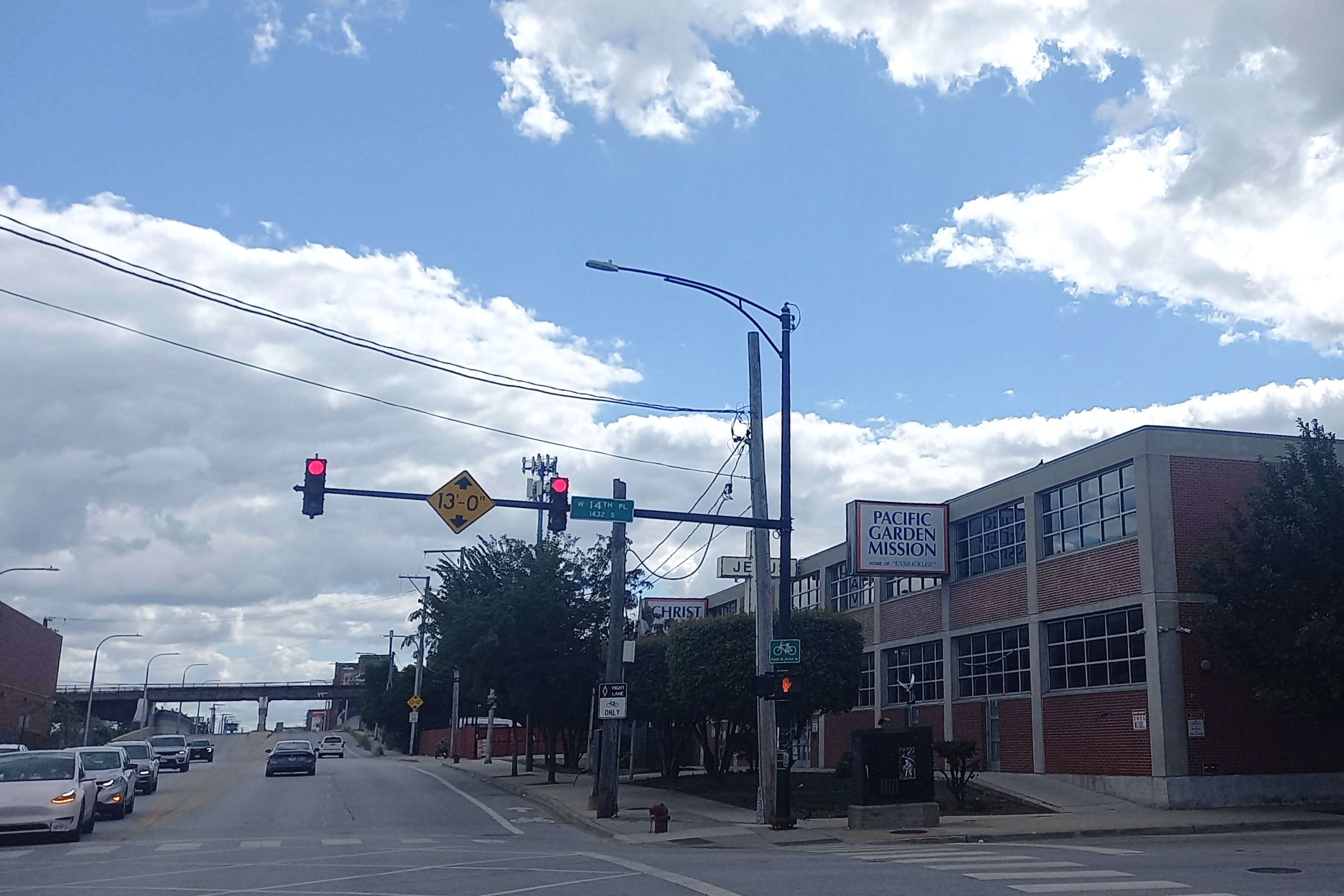
The Mission building at Canal Street

Pacific Garden Mission is a homeless shelter in the Near West Side of Chicago, Illinois founded in 1877. Its co-founders are Colonel George Clarke and his wife, Sarah. Nicknamed "The Old Lighthouse", it is the largest homeless shelter in Chicago. Its website states that it is "the oldest continuously operating rescue mission in the country."

Two famous evangelists who converted to Christianity as a result of PGM's efforts are Billy Sunday and Mel Trotter.

== History ==
In 1950, the Mission began production of Unshackled!, a radio dramatic series which showcases conversions to Evangelical Christianity. The show, recorded live at PGM, is still in production today and it is translated into seven languages for international distribution.

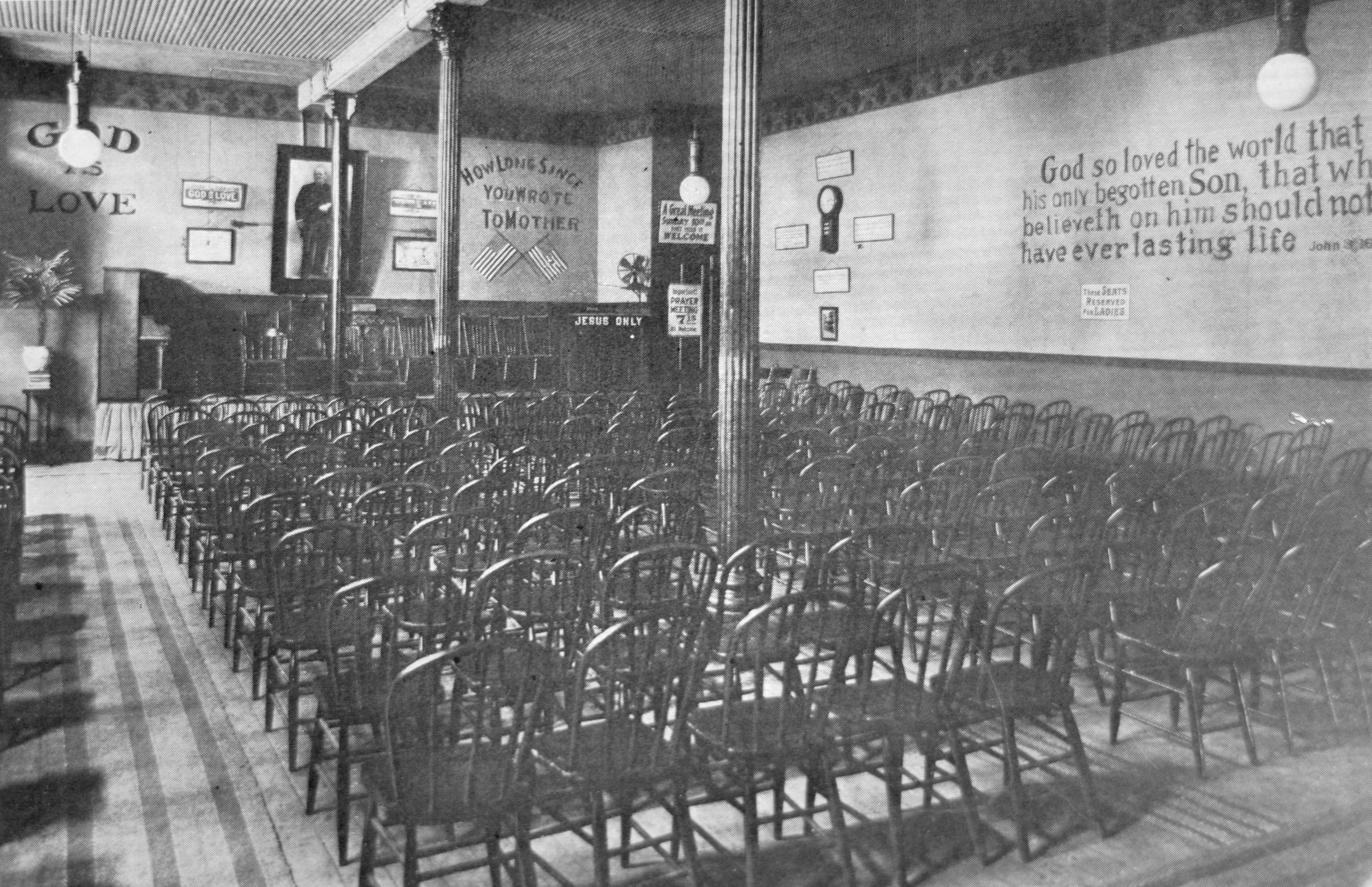
Mission interior, 1914

PGM's original location was 386 S. Clark Street. In 1880, the mission moved to 67 E. Van Buren Street, in a location which was formerly known as the Pacific Beer Garden. At that time, the current name of the mission, Pacific Garden Mission, was adopted; However, evangelist D.L. Moody suggested that the name of the former occupant should be kept but the word "Beer" should be dropped from the name.

In 1923, the Mission moved to 646 S. State Street, just south of The Loop, following a shift in the location of Chicago's Skid Row. At that time, the area was known for its hobo jungles and its flophouses.

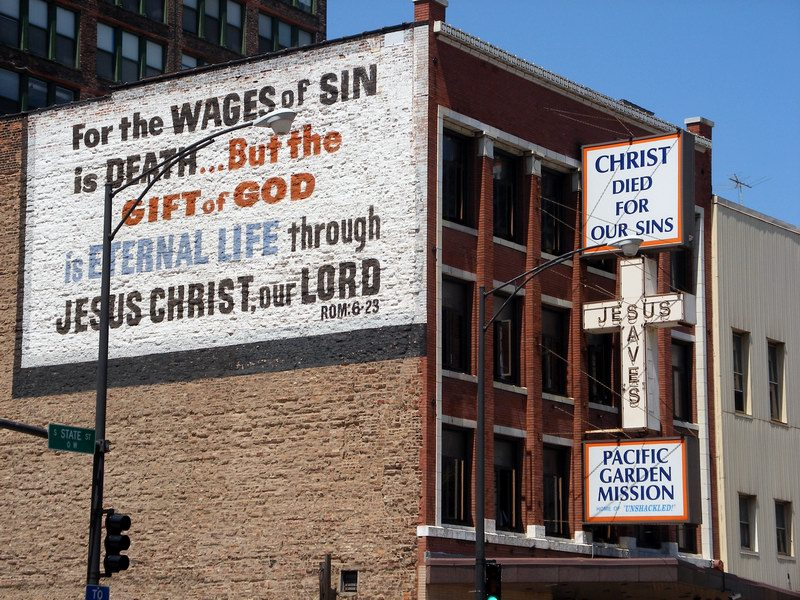
The former Mission building at 646 S. State Street

Beginning in the 1990s and continuing through the 2000s, the population of the neighborhood greatly increased. In response to this situation, the City of Chicago filed suit against the Mission in the early 2000s in order to expand the undersized and outdated facilities of Jones College Prep, a public high school which is located on 606 S. State Street, next to Pacific Garden Mission. In December 2004, the Mission and the city signed an agreement in which the city promised to move to a new location which is located on 1458 South Canal Street, about one mile southwest of its State Street location. PGM's State Street building was slated for demolition in order to make room for the Jones expansion. Groundbreaking for the new PGM facility took place on November 16, 2005. The building, which was designed by Chicago architect Stanley Tigerman of Tigerman McCurry Architects, was completed in 2007, and the formal dedication of it occurred on October 13, 2007.
