= Northern Indiana Valley Conference =

The Northern Indiana Valley Conference was an Indiana High School Athletic Association sanctioned conference in the South Bend/Mishawaka metropolitan area. The conference began as the St. Joseph County Conference in 1932, made up of county schools and South Bend schools not in the Northern Indiana Conference. Smaller county schools consolidated and moved to different conferences with schools of similar size, and by 1966 the county league was down to four members. The league decided to take in the two county Catholic schools, Marian and St. Joseph the next year, and rebranded as the Northern Indiana Valley Conference. The league took a hard hits beginning in 1974. Clay became an Independent (until 1978). Penn was accepted into the Northern Indiana Athletic Conference, South Bend Jackson announced its closure after the school year, and the league stopped sponsoring football. South Bend LaSalle were invited to replace LaPorte in the Northern Indiana Athletic Conference in 1976, although like Penn, they played in both leagues where schedules permitted. However, when Clay joined the Northern Indiana Athletic Conference in 1978, the schools broke off their relationship with the Catholic schools. Marian and St. Joseph continued on as independents for the next 27 years. With LaSalle closing in 2002, the Northern Indiana Athletic Conference discussed expanding beyond its seven schools, and took on both of the Catholic schools in 2005, so they absorbed every school in the Northern Indiana Valley Conference.

== Membership ==
All schools located in St. Joseph County.

School	Location	Mascot	Colors	Year joined	Previous conference	Year left	Conference joined
Greene Township	Crumstown	Bulldogs		1932		1965	none (consolidated into Walkerton
Lakeville	Lakeville	Trojans		1932		1965	none (consolidated into LaVille
Madison Township	Wyatt	Panthers		1932		1964	none (consolidated into Penn)
New Carlisle	New Carlisle	Tigers		1932		1966	Northern State
North Liberty	North Liberty	Shamrocks		1932		1966	Northern State
South Bend Wilson	South Bend	Presidents		1932		1950	none (school closed)
Walkerton	Walkerton	Indians		1932		1966	none (consolidated into Glenn
South Bend Clay^{1}	South Bend	Colonials		1939; 1963; 1974	none (new school); Northern State; Independents	1958; 1974; 1978	Northern State; Independents; Northern Indiana
Penn^{2}	Mishawaka	Kingsmen		1958	none (new school)	1978	Northern Indiana
South Bend Jackson	South Bend	Tigers		1965	none (new school)	1975	none (school closed)
South Bend LaSalle^{3}	South Bend	Lions		1965	none (new school)	1978	Northern Indiana
Mishawaka Marian	Mishawaka	Knights		1967	Independents	1978	Independents (Northern Indiana Athletic Conference 2005)
South Bend; St. Joseph's	South Bend	Indians		1967	Independents	1978	Independents (Northern Indiana Athletic Conference 2005)

1. Was Washington-Clay until 1963
2. Concurrent in Northern Indiana Valley Conference and Northern Indiana Athletic Conference, 1974–78.
3. Concurrent in Northern Indiana Valley Conference and Northern Indiana Athletic Conference, 1976–78.

== Conference champions (Football) ==
- 1967 - Mishawaka Marian (5–0)
- 1968 - South Bend St. Joseph's (4–1)
- 1969 - Mishawaka Marian (5–0)
- 1970 - Mishawaka Marian (5–0)
- 1971 - Mishawaka Marian (5–0)
- 1972 - South Bend St. Joseph's (5–0)
- 1973 - South Bend St. Joseph's (5–0)

== Related links ==
- Northern Indiana Football History
- Indiana High School Athletic Association
- List of high school athletic conferences in Indiana
- Indiana big school football champions
