= List of high school athletic conferences in Indiana =

The following are the Indiana High School Athletic Association (IHSAA) sports conference alignments for the 2023–2024 school year.

== The IHSAA Conferences 2023–2024 ==
The Indiana High School Athletic Association includes 427 member schools with 47 conferences. The largest conference is the Pocket Athletic with 13 schools.

Note 1: Boone Grove and South Central (Union Mills) compete in the Greater South Shore Conference as football-only members. They compete in all other sports in the Porter County Conference.
Note 2: The Mid-Indiana Football Conference competes only in football. It is made up of four Mid-Hoosier Conference football-playing schools (Eastern Hancock, Indian Creek, Knightstown, North Decatur, South Decatur), and Milan from the Ohio River Valley Conference.
Note 3: The Southwest Conference competes only in football. It is made up of schools from the Blue Chip Conference (North Knox and Wood Memorial) and Southwest Indiana Conference (Eastern Greene, North Central (Farmersburg)).

Allen County

- Adams Central - Monroe
- Bluffton
- Heritage - Monroeville
- Jay County - Portland
- South Adams - Berne
- Southern Wells - Poneto
- Woodlan - Woodburn

Blue Chip

- Barr-Reeve - Montgomery
- Loogootee
- Northeast Dubois
- North Knox - Bicknell^{3}
- Shoals
- South Knox - Vincennes
- Vincennes Rivet
- Washington Catholic
- Wood Memorial - Oakland City^{3}

Central Indiana

- Alexandria-Monroe
- Blackford - Hartford City
- Eastbrook - Arcana
- Elwood
- Frankton
- Madison-Grant - Fairmount
- Mississinewa - Gas City
- Oak Hill - Converse

Circle City

- Covenant Christian Indianapolis
- Guerin Catholic Noblesville
- Heritage Christian School Indianapolis
- Indianapolis Brebeuf Preparatory School
- Indianapolis Bishop Chatard
- Indianapolis Bishop Roncalli

Conference Indiana

- Bloomington North
- Bloomington South
- Columbus North
- Southport - Indianapolis
- Terre Haute North Vigo
- Terre Haute South Vigo

Duneland

- Chesterton
- Crown Point
- Lake Central - St. John
- LaPorte
- Merrillville
- Michigan City
- Portage
- Valparaiso

Eastern Indiana

- Batesville
- Connersville
- East Central - St. Leon
- Franklin County - Brookville
- Greensburg
- Lawrenceburg
- Rushville
- South Dearborn - Aurora

Great Lakes

- East Chicago Central
- Gary West
- Hammond Central
- Hammond Morton

Greater Indianapolis

- Christel House
- Eminence High School
- Indianapolis Howe
- Indiana Math & Science
- Irvington Prep
- Indianapolis Manual
- Indianapolis Metropolitan
- Indianapolis Tindley
- Indianapolis Washington
- Victory College Preparatory Academy

Greater South Shore

- Calumet
- Griffith
- Hammond Noll
- Hanover Central
- Lake Station Edison
- River Forest
- Wheeling
- Whiting

Hoosier

- Benton Central
- Hamilton Heights
- Lafayette Central Catholic
- Lewis Cass
- Northwestern
- Rensselaer Central
- Tipton
- Twin Lakes
- Western
- West Lafayette

Hoosier Crossroads

- Avon
- Brownsburg
- Fishers
- Franklin Central - Indianapolis
- Hamilton Southeastern - Fishers
- Noblesville
- Westfield
- Zionsville

Hoosier Heartland

- Carroll (Flora)
- Clinton Central - Michigantown
- Clinton Prairie - Frankfort
- Delphi
- Eastern Howard
- Rossville
- Sheridan
- Taylor
- Tri-Central

Hoosier Heritage

- Delta - Muncie
- Greenfield-Central
- Mt. Vernon (Fortville)
- New Castle Chrysler
- New Palestine
- Pendleton Heights
- Shelbyville
- Yorktown

Hoosier Hills

- Bedford North Lawrence
- Columbus East
- Floyd Central - Floyds Knobs
- Jeffersonville
- Jennings County - North Vernon
- New Albany
- Seymour

Indiana Crossroads

- Beech Grove
- Indianapolis Cardinal Ritter
- Indianapolis Lutheran
- Indianapolis Scecina
- Indianapolis Park Tudor
- Monrovia
- Speedway
- Triton Central - Fairland

Metropolitan

- Ben Davis - Indianapolis
- Lawrence Central
- Lawrence North
- North Central - Indianapolis
- Pike - Indianapolis
- Warren Central - Indianapolis

Mid-Eastern

- Blue River Valley - Mt. Summit
- Cowan
- Daleville
- Monroe Central - Parker City
- Randolph Southern - Lynn
- Union (Modoc)
- Wapahani - Selma
- Wes-Del - Gaston

Mid-Hoosier^{2}

- Eastern Hancock - Charlottesville^{2}
- Edinburgh
- Hauser - Hope
- Indian Creek - Trafalgar^{2}
- Knightstown^{2}
- Morristown
- North Decatur - Greensburg^{2}
- South Decatur - Greensburg^{2}
- Southwestern - Shelbyville
- Waldron

Mid-Indiana

- Cass - Walton
- Eastern (Greentown)
- Hamilton Heights - Arcadia
- Maconaquah - Bunker Hill
- Northwestern - Kokomo
- Peru
- Taylor - Kokomo
- Western - Russiaville

Mid-Southern

- Austin
- Brownstown Central
- Charlestown
- Clarksville
- Corydon Central
- Eastern (Pekin)
- North Harrison - Ramsay
- Salem
- Scottsburg
- Silver Creek - Sellersburg

Mid-State

- Decatur Central - Indianapolis
- Franklin Community
- Greenwood
- Martinsville
- Mooresville
- Perry Meridian - Indianapolis
- Plainfield
- Whiteland

Midwest

- Caston - Fulton
- Frontier - Chalmers
- North White - Monon
- Pioneer - Royal Center
- South Newton - Kentland
- Tri-County - Wolcott
- West Central - Medaryville
- Winamac

North Central

East

- Anderson
- Indianapolis Tech
- Marion
- Muncie Central
- Richmond

West

- Harrison (West Lafayette)
- Kokomo
- Lafayette Jefferson
- Logansport
- McCutcheon - Lafayette

Northeast Corner

- Angola
- Central Noble - Albion
- Churubusco
- Eastside - Butler
- Fairfield - Goshen
- Fremont
- Hamilton
- Lakeland - Lagrange
- Prairie Heights - Lagrange
- West Noble - Ligonier
- Westview - Topeka

Northeast Hoosier

- Bellmont - Decatur
- Fort Wayne Carroll
- Columbia City
- DeKalb - Waterloo
- East Noble - Kendallville
- Fort Wayne Homestead
- New Haven
- Norwell - Ossian

Northern Indiana

- Bremen
- Elkhart
- Jimtown
- John Glenn
- Mishawaka Marian
- New Prairie
- Penn
- South Bend Adams
- South Bend Clay

Northern Lakes

- Concord
- Goshen
- Mishawaka
- Northridge - Middlebury
- NorthWood - Nappanee
- Plymouth
- Warsaw
- Wawasee - Syracuse

Northern State

- Bremen
- Culver Community
- Glenn - Walkerton
- Jimtown - Jamestown
- Knox
- LaVille - Lakeville
- New Prairie - New Carlisle
- Triton - Bourbon

Northwest Crossroads

- Andrean - Merrillville
- Griffith
- Highland
- Hobart
- Kankakee Valley - Wheatfield
- Lowell
- Munster

Ohio River Valley

- Jac-Cen-Del - Osgood
- Milan^{2}
- Rising Sun
- Shawe Memorial - Madison
- South Ripley - Versailles
- Southwestern (Hanover)
- Switzerland County - Vevay

Patoka Lake

- Crawford County - Marengo
- Mitchell
- Orleans
- Paoli
- Perry Central - Leopold
- Springs Valley - French Lick
- West Washington - Campbellsburg

Pioneer

- Anderson Preparatory Academy
- Baptist Academy - Indianapolis
- Greenwood Christian
- Indianapolis Attucks
- Indianapolis Shortridge
- International School - Indianapolis
- Liberty Christian - Anderson

Pocket Athletic

- Boonville
- Forest Park - Ferdinand
- Gibson Southern - Ft. Branch
- Heritage Hills - Lincoln City
- Mount Vernon
- North Posey - Poseyville
- Pike Central - Petersburg
- Princeton
- Southridge - Huntingburg
- South Spencer - Rockport
- Tecumseh
- Tell City
- Washington

Porter County^{1}

- Boone Grove^{1}
- Hebron
- Kouts
- LaCrosse
- Morgan Township - Valparaiso
- South Central (Union Mills)^{1}
- Washington Township - Valparaiso
- Westville

Sagamore

- Crawfordsville
- Danville
- Frankfort
- Lebanon
- North Montgomery - Crawfordsville
- Southmont - Crawfordsville
- Tri-West Hendricks - Lizton
- Western Boone - Thorntown

Southern

- Borden
- Crothersville
- Henryville
- Lanesville
- New Washington
- South Central (Elizabeth)

Southern Roads Conference

- Bloomington Lighthouse
- Cannelton
- Columbus Christian
- Madison Christian
- Medora
- Pleasant View Christian - Montgomery
- Seven Oaks Classical - Ellettsville
- Union Dugger

Southern Indiana

- Castle - Newburgh
- Evansville Bosse
- Evansville Central
- Evansville Harrison
- Evansville Mater Dei
- Evansville Memorial
- Evansville North
- Evansville Reitz
- Jasper
- Vincennes Lincoln

Southwest Indiana

- Bloomfield
- Clay City
- Eastern Greene - Bloomfield^{3}
- Linton-Stockton
- North Central (Farmersburg)^{3}
- North Daviess - Elnora
- Shakamak - Jasonville
- White River Valley - Switz City

Southwest Football^{3}

- Eastern Greene - Bloomfield
- North Central (Farmersburg)
- North Knox - Bicknell
- Wood Memorial - Oakland City

Summit

- Fort Wayne Bishop Dwenger
- Fort Wayne Bishop Luers
- Fort Wayne Concordia
- Fort Wayne North Side
- Fort Wayne Northrop
- Fort Wayne Snider
- Fort Wayne South Side
- Fort Wayne Wayne

Three Rivers

- Manchester - North Manchester
- Northfield - Wabash
- North Miami - Denver
- Rochester
- Southwood - Wabash
- Tippecanoe Valley - Akron
- Wabash
- Whitko - South Whitley

Tri-Eastern

- Cambridge City Lincoln
- Centerville
- Hagerstown
- Northeastern - Fountain City
- Tri - Straughn
- Union City
- Union County - Liberty
- Winchester

Wabash River

- Attica
- Covington
- Fountain Central - Veedersburg
- North Vermillion - Cayuga
- Parke Heritage - Rockville
- Riverton Parke - Montezuma
- Seeger - West Lebanon

West Central

- Cascade - Clayton
- Cloverdale
- Greencastle
- North Putnam - Roachdale
- South Putnam - Putnamville

Western Indiana

- Brown County - Nashville
- Edgewood - Ellettsville
- Northview - Brazil
- Owen Valley - Spencer
- South Vermillion - Clinton
- Sullivan
- West Vigo - West Terre Haute

Independents

- 21st Century Academy - Gary
- Argos
- Bethany Christian - Goshen
- Bethesda Christian - Brownsburg
- Bowman Academy - Gary
- Campagna Academy - Schererville
- Carmel
- Center Grove
- Christian Academy of Indiana - New Albany
- Covenant Christian - DeMotte
- Culver Academies
- Dugger-Union
- Elkhart Christian
- Evansville Day
- Evansville Lutheran
- Evansville Signature
- Fall Creek Academy - Indianapolis
- Fort Wayne Blackhawk Christian
- Fort Wayne Canterbury
- Gary Roosevelt
  * Howe Military
- Indiana School for the Blind - Indianapolis
- Indiana School for the Deaf - Indianapolis
- Indianapolis Cathedral
- Indianapolis Herron
- Indianapolis Shortridge
- Indianapolis Tindley
- Indianapolis Washington
- Lakewood Park Christian - Auburn
- Lapel
- Linton-Stockton (fb only)
- Medora
- Muncie Burris
- North Daviess - Elnora (fb only)
- North Judson-San Pierre
- Oregon-Davis
- Providence - Clarksville
- Rock Creek Academy - Sellersburg
- Seton Catholic - Richmond
- Shenandoah - Middletown
- Trinity Lutheran - Seymour
- University - Carmel
- Tecumseh - Lynville (fb only)

=== Non IHSAA School Conferences ===
Central Indiana Christian Conference

- Colonial Christian - Indianapolis
- Cornerstone Christian - Indianapolis
- Eagledale Christian - Indianapolis
- Heritage Hall - Muncie
- Indiana Christian- Anderson
- Suburban Christian - Indianapolis
- Tabernacle - Martinsville
- Terre Haute Christian

Heartland Homeschool Conference

- Anderson Homeschool Sons
- Eastside Golden Eagles - Indianapolis
- Indianapolis Homeschool Wildcats
- Living Water Marlins - Plainfield
- Noblesville Lions
- Northwest Warriors - Indianapolis

South Shore Christian Conference

- Calumet Christian
- Christian Haven
- Families of Faith Christian Academy (Illinois)
- First Baptist School - Mishawaka
- Grace Baptist Christian - Plymouth
- Granger Christian
- Home School Resource Center (Illinois)
- Luther East (Illinois)
- Mishawaka Christian Athletic Club
- Portage Christian
- Victory Christian

== Conference Changes ==
Note: Only partial information is available before the 1994–95 school year.

=== 1993–1994 ===
The Indiana Lake Shore conference became the Lake 10 Conference with the addition of five schools:

- Calumet, Griffith, Highland, and Munster joined from the Lake Suburban Conference.
- Whiting joined after playing as an Independent.

The Lake Suburban Conference disbanded after four schools leave for the Lake 10:

- Crown Point joined the Duneland Conference.
- Lowell joined the Northwest Hoosier Conference.
- Lake Central became an independent.

=== 1994–1995 ===
- Southwestern (Hanover) was removed from the Ohio River Valley Conference for rule violations.

=== 1995–1996 ===
- Michigan City Elston and Michigan City Rogers consolidated into Michigan City High School. MCHS retained Rogers's spot in the Duneland Conference, vacating Elston's spot in the Northern Indiana Conference.
- Triton Central left the Rangeland Conference to play as an independent.
- Indianapolis Howe and Indianapolis Washington both closed, leaving the Indianapolis Public Schools Conference at 5 teams.

=== 1996–1997 ===
- Delta left the White River Conference to play as an independent.
- Seymour joined the Hoosier Hills Conference, keeping their membership in the South Central Conference simultaneously.
- Shelbyville left the South Central Conference to play as an independent.
- Triton Central joined the Mid-Hoosier Conference, previously playing as an independent for a season after leaving the Rangeland Conference.

=== 1997–1998 ===
Conference Indiana was formed from six of the Central Suburban Conference schools:

- Decatur Central
- Franklin Central
- Lawrence Central
- Perry Meridian
- Pike
- Southport

and four South Central Conference schools:

- Bloomington North
- Bloomington South
- Columbus North
- Martinsville

The Metropolitan Athletic Conference was formed:

- Ben Davis (former Independent)
- Carmel (former Olympic Conference)
- Center Grove (former South Central)
- Lawrence North (former Central Suburban)
- Terre Haute North (former Independent)
- Terre Haute South (former Independent)
- North Central (Indianapolis) (former Independent)
- Warren Central (former Independent)

The Hoosier Conference disbanded:

- Harrison (West Lafayette) and McCutcheon left the Hoosier Conference to join the Olympic Conference.
- Benton Central, Twin Lakes, and West Lafayette played as independents for the season.
- Brownsburg joined the Olympic Conference, formerly playing as an independent.
- Delta joined the Hoosier Heritage Conference, formerly playing as an independent.
- Hamilton Southeastern left the Hoosier Heritage Conference for the Olympic Conference.
- Seymour left the South Central Conference, playing exclusively in the Hoosier Hills Conference. Previously they were a member of both conferences.
- Shelbyville joined the Hoosier Heritage Conference, formerly playing as an independent for a season after leaving the South Central Conference.
- Yorktown left the White River Conference to join the Rangeline Conference.
- Anderson Madison Heights closed, leaving the Olympic Conference at 10 members.

=== 1998–1999 ===
The Lake 10 Conference was renamed the Lake Athletic Conference

- Andrean joined after playing as an Independent.
- Lowell and Lake Station Edison both left the Northwest Hoosier.

The Hoosier Conference was reformed. Previous conference members Benton Central, Twin Lakes, and West Lafayette were joined by:

- Delphi (former Hoosier Heartland Conference)
- Rensselaer Central (former Northwest Hoosier)

The Northland Conference was formed:

- Argos (former Independent)
- Marquette Catholic (former Independent)
- Oregon-Davis (former Independent)
- River Forest (former Northwest Hoosier)
- South Central (Union Mills) (former Independent)
- Westville (former Porter County Conference)
- Eastbrook left the Mid-Indiana Conference to join the Central Indiana Conference.
- Frankton left the White River Conference to join the Central Indiana Conference.
- Peru left the Central Indiana Conference to join the Mid-Indiana Conference.
- Tipton left the Central Indiana Conference to join the Rangeline Conference.
- Kankakee Valley, North Judson, and North Newton, the remnants of the Northwest Hoosier Conference, play as independents.
- Southwestern (Hanover) rejoined the Ohio River Valley Conference after being forced out due to rules violations in 1995.

=== 1999–2000 ===
The Western Indiana Conference was formed:

- Brown County (former Mid-Hoosier Conference)
- Edgewood (former West Central Conference)
- Northview (former Independent)
- Owen Valley (former West Central Conference)
- South Vermillion (former Wabash River Conference)
- Sullivan (former Tri-River Conference)
- West Vigo (former independent)
- Danville and Tri-West Hendricks both left the West Central Conference to join the Sagamore Conference.
- Fort Wayne Canturbury joined the Midland Conference
- Speedway left the Mid-State Conference to join the West Central Conference.
- Yorktown left the Rangeline Conference to join the Hoosier Heritage Conference.

=== 2000–2001 ===
The Hoosier Crossroads Conference was formed from the members of the Olympic Conference West Division:

- Brownsburg
- Hamilton Southeastern
- Harrison (West Lafayette)
- McCutcheon
- Noblesville

plus:

- Avon (former Mid-State Conference)
- Westfield (former Rangeline Conference)
- Zionsville (former Rangeline Conference)
- Sheridan and Tipton both left the Rangeline Conference to play in the Hoosier Conference.
- Hamilton Heights left the Rangeline Conference to play in the Mid-Indiana Conference.
- Indianapolis Scecina Memorial, the sole remaining Rangeline Conference member, played as an independent.
- Elkhart Memorial joined the Northern Lakes Conference, keeping their membership in the Northern Indiana Conference simultaneously.
- Wood Memorial left the Pocket Athletic Conference to play as an independent.

=== 2001–2002 ===
- Elkhart Memorial left the Northern Indiana Conference to exclusively play in the Northern Lakes Conference. Previously they were a member of both conferences.
- Tell City left the Big Eight Conference to join the Pocket Athletic Conference.
- Wood Memorial joined the Blue Chip Conference, formerly playing as an independent for a year after leaving the Pocket Athletic Conference.

=== 2002–2003 ===
- Eastern (Pekin) left the Southern Conference to join the Mid-South Conference.
- South Bend St. Joseph's joined the Northern Indiana Conference, formerly playing as an independent. They took the place of South Bend LaSalle, which closed prior to this season.
- Fort Wayne Canterbury left the Midland Conference to play as an independent.

=== 2003–2004 ===
- Mount Carmel of Illinois joined the Big Eight Conference after the breakup of the North Egypt Conference, becoming the only non-Indiana member of an Indiana conference.
- Lake Central joined the Duneland Conference, formerly competing as an independent.
- Mishawaka Marian joined the Northern Indiana Conference, formerly competing as an independent.
- Hobart left the Duneland conference to join the Lake Athletic Conference.
- Kankakee Valley joined the Lake Athletic Conference, formerly competing as an independent.
- Wheeler left the Porter County Conference to join the Lake Athletic Conference.
- South Central (Union Mills) left the Northland Conference to join the Porter County Conference.
- Lafayette Jefferson left the North Central Conference to compete as an independent.

=== 2004–2005 ===
- Gary Mann closed, leaving the Northwestern Conference at four schools.
- Lafayette Jefferson joined the Hoosier Crossroads Conference, formerly playing as an Independent for a season after leaving the North Central Conference.
- Huntington North left the Olympic Conference to join the North Central Conference.
- Indianapolis Howe and Indianapolis Washington were reopened, and rejoined the Indianapolis Public Schools Conference.
- Elkhart Christian joined the Northland Conference, formerly competing as an independent.

=== 2005–2006 ===
The Indiana Crossroads Conference was formed:

- Beech Grove (former Mid-State Conference)
- Indianapolis Cardinal Ritter (former Independent)
- Indianapolis Park Tudor (former Independent, former Mid-Indiana Football Conference football-only member)
- Indianapolis Scecina Memorial (former Independent)
- Garrett left the Northeast Corner Conference and joined the Allen County Conference.

=== 2006–2007 ===
- Decatur Central and Martinsville left Conference Indiana to join the Mid-State Conference.
- Wabash left the Central Indiana Conference to join the Three Rivers Conference.
- Oak Hill left the Three Rivers Conference to join the Central Indiana Conference.

=== 2007–2008 ===
Three new conferences came into existence out of the Lake Athletic Conference's breakup: Great Lakes Conference

- Hammond (former LAC Black Division)
- Hammond Clark (former LAC Blue Division)
- Hammond Gavit (former LAC Blue Division)
- Hammond Morton (former LAC Black Division)

Greater South Shore

- North Newton (former Independent)
- Lake Station Edison (former LAC Blue Division)
- Hammond Bishop Noll (former LAC Blue Division)
- Michigan City Marquette (former Northland member)
- Calumet (former LAC Blue Division)
- River Forest (former Northland member, former football-only Independent)
- Wheeler (former LAC Blue Division)
- Whiting (former LAC Blue Division)

In addition, with Marquette Catholic not fielding a football team, South Central (Union Mills) of the Porter County Conference plays in the GSSC for football. They were previously an independent.

Northwest Crossroads Conference

- Andrean (former LAC Black Division)
- Griffith (former LAC Black Division)
- Highland (former LAC Black Division)
- Hobart (former LAC Black Division)
- Kankakee Valley (former LAC Blue Division)
- Lowell (former LAC Black Division)
- Munster (former LAC Black Division)
- Forest Park left the Blue Chip Conference to join the Pocket Athletic Conference, coinciding with the start of their football program.
- Fishers High School was reopened and joined the Hoosier Crossroads Conference, giving them 10 schools.
- Indianapolis Crispus Attucks was reopened, and rejoined the Indianapolis Public Schools Conference.

=== 2008–2009 ===
- Wes-Del left the White River Conference in all sports except football to join the Mid-Eastern Conference. They are now a football-only participant in the White River.

=== 2009–2010 ===
The Pioneer Conference was formed:

- Baptist Academy - Indianapolis (former Central Indiana Christian Conference)
- Greenwood Christian (former Independent)
- Indianapolis Attucks (former Indianapolis Public Schools Conference)
- International (former Independent)
- Liberty Christian (former independent)
- Gary Wirt closed, leaving the Northwestern Conference at three schools.
- Lapel (former White River Conference) and Indianapolis Lutheran (former independent) joined the Indiana Crossroads Conference, giving the conference 6 schools. Lapel competed in both the ICC and WRC simultaneously.
- Wes-Del ended their football-only affiliation with the WRC, playing as an independent.

=== 2010–2011 ===
- Anderson Highland closed, leaving three Olympic Conference schools: Connersville, Jay County, and Muncie South Side. Concerns over Muncie South Side also closing after the school year caused the remaining three schools to disband the conference and play as independents.
- Fort Wayne Elmhurst closed, leaving the Summit Conference at 9 schools.
- Indianapolis Marshall and Indianapolis Shortridge joined conferences after being reopened the previous year. Marshall rejoined the Indianapolis Public Schools Conference, while Shortridge joined the Pioneer Conference.
- Lapel joined the Indiana Crossroads Conference full-time, effectively folding the White River Conference. Eastern Hancock, Knightstown, and Shenandoah become independent with the dissolution of the league.
- Morton Memorial closed, having played independently since leaving the Big Blue River Conference in 1970.

=== 2011–2012 ===
- Lafayette Central Catholic left the Hoosier Heartland Conference for the Hoosier Conference.
- Harding closed, leaving the Summit Conference at 8 schools.
- Edinburgh left the Mid-Indiana Football Conference to become independent; all other sports remain in Mid-Hoosier Conference.
- Campagna Academy & White's Institute withdrew membership from the IHSAA

=== 2012–2013 ===
- Sheridan left the Hoosier Conference for the Hoosier Heartland Conference, completing the swap of Sheridan and Lafayette Central Catholic between the two conferences.
- Eastern Hancock, independent since the White River Conference folded, joined the Mid-Hoosier Conference. They were originally scheduled to join in 2013 with Knightstown, but were able to adjust their schedules to join early.

=== 2013–2014 ===
- Rushville and Connersville joined the Eastern Indiana Athletic Conference. Connersville had been independent since the demise of the Olympic Conference, while Rushville left the Hoosier Heritage Conference.
- Hanover Central joined the Greater South Shore Conference from the Porter County Conference. Originally scheduled to take place in 2015, the PCC allowed this move to happen two years early. The GSSC also added Boone Grove in football only, remaining in the PCC in all other sports.
- Westville, independent since the Northland Conference folded, rejoins the Porter County Conference, taking Hanover Central's place.
- Knightstown, a former WRC school, joins the Mid-Hoosier Conference.
- New Castle Chrysler voted to take Rushville's spot in the Hoosier Heritage Conference in 2014, and is removed by the North Central Conference immediately. The HHC arranged for New Castle to compete in some sports immediately, allowing the school partial affiliation.
- The Metropolitan Conference and Conference Indiana essentially swap teams. Lawrence Central and Pike went to the MIC, while Terre Haute North and South were taken in as football-only members of CI. Shortly after the football season, they were both accepted into full membership starting in 2014.

=== 2014–2015 ===
- Lafayette Jefferson, McCutcheon, and West Lafayette Harrison join the North Central Conference. The three schools were part of the Hoosier Crossroads Conference, but had been voted out as the HCC shrank their footprint.
- Muncie Burris was voted out of the Mid-Eastern Conference. They play as an Independent this year before joining the Pioneer Conference.
- Jay County joined the Allen County Athletic Conference, having been independent since the demise of the Olympic Conference in 2010.
- Monrovia left the West Central Conference for the Indiana Crossroads Conference, leaving the WCC at five schools.
- Lapel left the Indiana Crossroads Conference to become Independent.
- Garret returned to the Northeast Corner Conference after a few years in the Allen County Conference.
- Union (Dugger) is closed. A charter school, Dugger Union High School, is formed to take its place (complete with athletics), however decided not to pursue IHSAA membership for this school year due to the short time span between the school's formation and application deadline.
- Muncie South Side, whose uncertain status caused the Olympic Conference to fold, is closed. This also means that the second and third high schools in the three cities that prompted the formation of the OC (Anderson, Kokomo, and Muncie) have all closed, leaving all three with one NCC-affiliated high school.

=== 2015–2016 ===
This year marks a major shakeup for Indiana conferences. The Hoosier North Athletic Conference is formed by the following schools:

- Caston (former Midwest Conference)
- Culver (former Northern State Conference)
- Knox (former Northern State Conference)
- LaVille (former Northern State Conference)
- North Judson-San Pierre (Independent, former NWHC member)
- Pioneer (former Midwest Conference)
- Triton (former Northern State Conference)
- West Central (former Midwest Conference)
- Winamac (former Midwest Conference)

The Midwest Conference disbands after four schools leave for the HNAC:

- Frontier and Tri-County join the Hoosier Heartland Conference.
- South Newton joins the Sangamon Valley Conference in Illinois, becoming the only Indiana school to play in an out-of-state conference.
- North White does not currently have a conference to join.

The Northern State Conference disbands after four schools leave for the HNAC:

- Bremen, Jimtown, John Glenn, and New Prairie join the Northern Indiana Conference, growing that league to 13 schools.

The Mid-Indiana Conference disbands:

- Cass, Hamilton Heights, Northwestern, and Western join the Hoosier Athletic Conference.
- Eastern (Greentown) and Taylor join the Hoosier Heartland Conference.
- Maconaquah and Peru join the Three Rivers Conference.

Other conference moves include:

- Carroll (FW) and Homestead, forced out of the Northeast Hoosier Conference, join the Summit Conference in football and basketball.
- The Pioneer Conference expands by four schools, adding former MEC member Muncie Burris, as well as independents Anderson Prep, Seton Catholic (Richmond), and University (Carmel).
- Leo and Huntington North join the Northeast Hoosier Conference. Leo left the Allen County Athletic Conference, and Huntington North left the North Central Conference.
- The North Central Conference adds Arsenal Tech from the IPS Conference to take Huntington North's place.
- The Western Indiana Conference, after courting Greencastle of the West Central Conference, agrees to take all five remaining WCC schools, effectively ending the league.
- Delphi, after refusing to play some of the larger schools in the Hoosier Athletic Conference in 2016–17, and asking to leave the conference that year, has their membership terminated on December 17, 2015. Even though they will play through their schedules, they will not be eligible for conference awards.

=== 2021–2022 ===
- Carmel and Center Grove leave the MIC to join the Hoosier Crossroads Conference, but are not accepted and elect to go Independent.
