= Bob Otolski =

American football player and coach (born 1937)

Biographical details
- Born: August 22, 1937 (age 89); South Bend, Indiana, U.S.

Playing career
- 1957–1959: Indianapolis

Coaching career (HC unless noted)
- 1966–1972: Marian HS (IN)
- 1973: Ben Davis HS (IN)
- 1973–1980: Indiana (ST)
- 1981–1987: Illinois State

Head coaching record
- Overall: 30–41–3 (college); 59–10–1 (high school)

Robert Otolski (born August 22, 1937) is an American former football coach. He was the 17th head football coach Illinois State University in Normal, Illinois, serving for seven seasons, from 1981 to 1987, and compiling a record of 30–41–3.

== Playing career ==
Otolski attended Washington High School in South Bend, Indiana. There he was a standout member of the football team playing both offense and defense. He was an instrumental part of the 1953 State Championship team. After he graduated in 1955, he accepted a scholarship to play football at the University of Indianapolis. While there he lettered three times for the Greyhounds, playing offense, defense and special teams. In 1957 he led team in pass receptions and receiving yards as well as leading the conference in punting while being named 2nd Team All-conference in 1957. In 1958 he led the conference in quarterback sacks, and again in punting and named 2nd Team All-Conference. He also was a member of the Indianapolis golf team, which won two conference titles while he was there.

== Coaching career ==
Otolski began coaching football in 1961 at St. Joseph's High School in his hometown of South Bend, where he was the head coach of the junior varsity team. In 1964 he became the athletic director at Marian High School in Mishawaka, Indiana. In 1966 he started the school's first ever football team leading them to a 6–6 record. In 1971 he was named the Indiana High School Coach of the Year. He went on to coach till 1972, compiling a 59–10–1 record leading the team to three undefeated seasons. He also won four Northern Indiana Valley Conference titles. After the 1972 season, he became the head coach at Ben Davis High School in Indianapolis, but he never coached a game there resigning and joining the Indiana University football staff, where he worked seven seasons as an assistant to Lee Corso. During his time at Indiana, they went on to win the first bowl game in school history, the 1979 Holiday Bowl. In 1981 he was hired as the head football coach at Illinois State University. He went on to be the coach til 1987 and compiled a 30–41–3 record.

== Honors ==
In 2000, Otolski was inducted into the Marian Hall of Fame. In 2001, he was inducted into the University of Indianapolis Athletics Hall of Fame. In 2002, Marian named their football field, "Bob Otolski Field" after Bob.

== Head coaching record ==
=== College ===
Year	Team	Overall	Conference	Standing	Bowl/playoffs
Illinois State Redbirds (Missouri Valley Conference) (1981–1985)
1981	Illinois State	3–7	0–5	8th	
1982	Illinois State	2–9	0–5	8th	
1983	Illinois State	6–4–1	2–2–1	T–5th	
1984	Illinois State	5–6	3–2	3rd	
1985	Illinois State	6–3–2	3–1–1	T–2nd	
Illinois State Redbirds (Gateway Collegiate Athletic Conference) (1986–1987)
1986	Illinois State	5–5	3–3	4th	
1987	Illinois State	3–7	0–6	7th	
Illinois State:		30–41–3	11–24–2		
Total:		30–41–3			
