= Washington High School (South Bend, Indiana) =

Public school in Indiana, United States

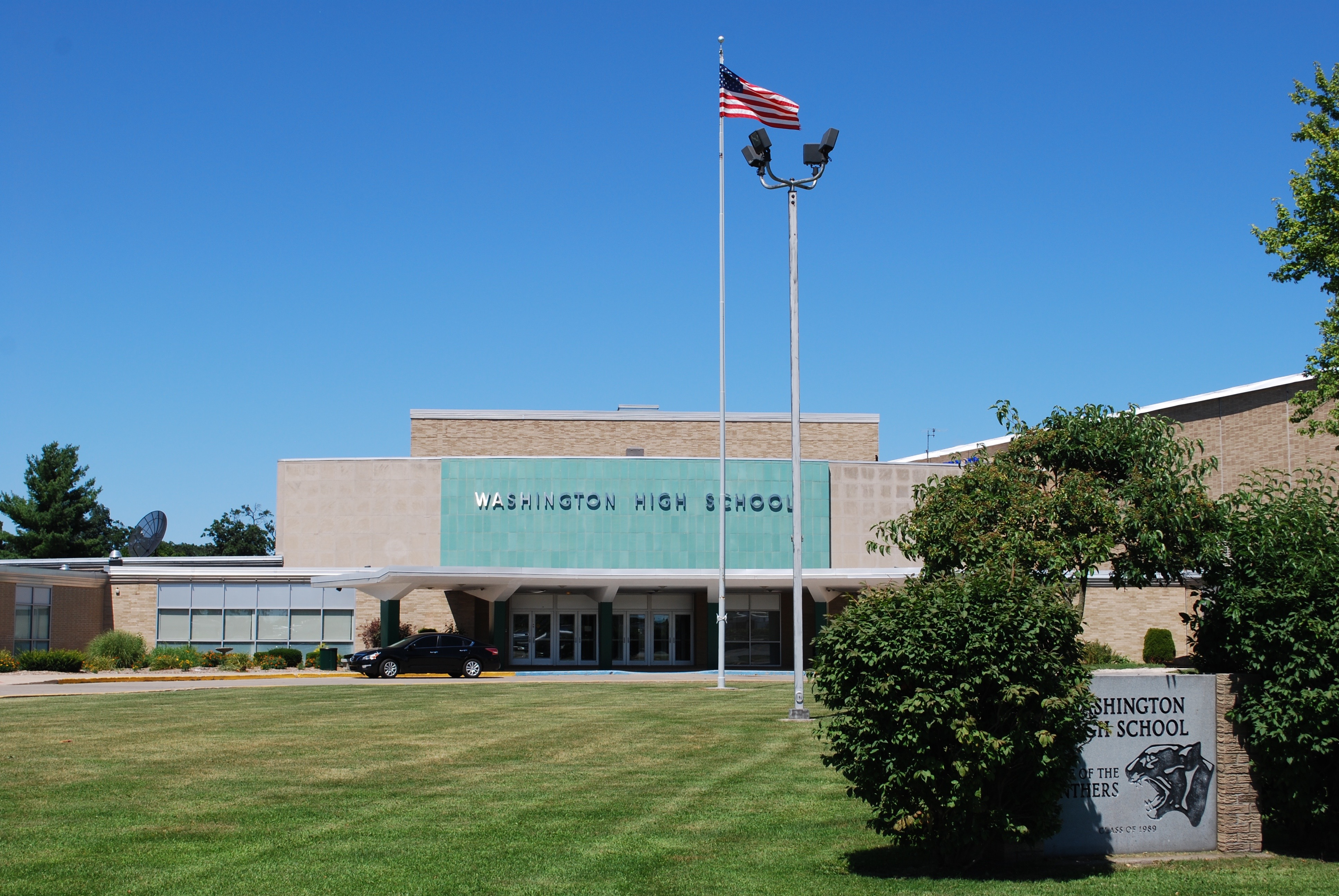

Location
- 4747 West Washington Avenue; South Bend, St. Joseph County, Indiana 46619; United States; 41°40′30″N 86°18′52″W

Information
- Type: Public High School
- Motto: Motto: "Ever Onward!"
- Established: 1938
- School district: South Bend Community School Corporation
- Principal: Kevin Goralczyk
- Teaching staff: 69.89 (FTE)
- Grades: 9–12
- Enrollment: 812 (2023–2024)
- Student to teacher ratio: 11.62
- Colors: Green, white, and gold
- Athletics conference: Northern Indiana Athletic Conference
- Team name: Panthers
- Rival: South Bend Riley
- Yearbook: Memory Lane
- Military: United States Air Force JROTC
- Website: washington.sb.school

Washington High School is a public high school in South Bend, Indiana, United States. It is part of the SBCSC magnet program, where it is the Medical/Allied Health Magnet strain.

== History ==
Washington High School first opened its doors in 1938, moving to its current location on February 1, 1960. The project had been started in 1956, when the financing for the building was allocated. Approximately $4,000,000 were set aside for the construction. Maurer and Maurer architectural firm was hired to build the facility, and ground breaking occurred on October 22, 1958. Since 1959, the building has undergone some changes. A second gymnasium has been added, along with updates to the athletic fields. Beginning in 2002, a massive school renovation began. The building gained many classrooms, a new lunchroom, and new gymnasium. The original school was located on West Sample St. at Humpherey's Court, after the school moved the original building served, as Lulu V Cline, later as the South Bend campus of Ivy Tech.

== Athletics ==
Washington High School has acquired a rich sports heritage throughout its years.

Football

- State Football Champions- 1939, 1943, 1953, and 1969.
- IHSAA State Champions- 1973.
- Semi-State Champions- 2011.
- Class 4A Regional Champions- 2011.
- Class 3A/4A Sectional Champions- 1973 and 1977(3A). 2011(4A).
- N.I.C Conference Champions- 1939, 1943, 1944, 1953, 1961, 1964, 1967, 1969, 1973, 1975, 2009, and 2015.

On September 3, 2011, Gehrig Dieter set a national record for receiving yards in a high school football game, with 447 yards against Elkhart Central High School. 2 weeks prior, Dieter had set an Indiana state record for receiving yards with 373 yards against Bloomington High School North. In that same season Washington won semi-state.

Girls' Basketball

- Class 3A/4A IHSAA State Champions- 2007(4A) and 2022(3A).
- Class 3A/4A Semi-State Champions- 2006, 2007, 2008, and 2009(4A). 2021 and 2022(4A)
- Class 3A/4A Regional Champions- 2006, 2007, 2008, 2009, and 2023(4A). 2021 and 2022(3A).
- Class 3A/4A Sectional Champions- 1992, 1993, 1999, 2021, and 2022(3A). 2004, 2005, 2006, 2007, 2008, 2009, 2023, and 2024(4A).
- N.I.C Conference Champions- 2000, 2004, 2006, 2007, 2008, 2009, 2015, 2022, 2023, 2024, and 2025.

The program produced two of the nation's top girls' basketball prospects. Jacqueline Batteast and Skylar Diggins. Diggins was ranked 3rd overall in the ESPN "Hot 100" and was 1st overall for guards. Diggins played for the University of Notre Dame and followed Batteast as one of the best female athletes to attend Washington High School, and to go on to play Div-1A basketball.

Boys' Basketball

- Regional Champions- 1965
- Class 3A/4A Sectional Champions- 1938, 1964, 1997, 2002, and 2010(4A). 2023(3A).
- N.I.C Conference Champions- 1955, 1977, 1988, 1999, 2002, 2008, 2009, 2012, and 2016.

Baseball

- Semi-State Champions- 1974 and 1985.
- Regional Champions- 1974, 1985 and 1996.
- Sectional Champions- 1974, 1982, 1985, 1986, 1989, 1996, and 1997.
- N.I.C Conference Champions- 1990 and 1996.

Softball

- Sectional Champions- 1986, 1990, 1993, and 1995.
- N.I.C Conference Champions- 1986.

Wrestling

- Sectional Champions- 1967, 1969, 1970, 1971, 1972, 1977, 1979, 1980, 1981, 1989, 1991, 1993, 1995, 1996, 1997, and 1999.

Girls' Soccer

Boys' Soccer

Boys' and Girls' Cross Country

Boys' and Girls' Swimming and Diving

Boys' Track & Field

- Individual State Champions- 2015: John Hankerson (100M dash).1953 and 1954(440 Yd. Dash*) Clyde Austin, 1959(Shot Put) George Thomas. 1978 and 1979(Mile Relay*) Anthony Davis, Darwyn Hilliard, Ron Moore, and Tim Turner. Tim Turner also won the 100 Yd. Dash* in 1978.
- Regional Champions- 2010.
- Sectional Champions- 1966, 1967, 1972, and 1982.

*-no longer an event

Girls' Track & Field

- Individual State Champion- 2025: (100M Hurdles) Adriana Swanson, 1983 (Long Jump) KimBerly Kilgore, 1988 (400 M Dash) Cindy Stallworth

Boys' and Girls' Golf

- Individual State Champion - 1968 Ken Czajkowski (Boys' Golf) with a score of 70

Volleyball

Boys' and Girls' Tennis

The Panthers' chief rivals are Mishawaka High School, South Bend Clay High School, South Bend Riley High School, South Bend St. Joseph's High School, Penn High School, South Bend John Adams, and Mishawaka Marian.

== Academics ==
- In 2005, the South Bend Community School Corporation moved into a magnet school corporation. Washington was chosen as the Medical/Applied Health Magnet Program. The 2012 graduation rate was 86%, with a total number of 254 graduates. The program allows students to obtain an understanding of the medical field, and to teach them medical skills such as C.P.R. The program lasts four years, and the students Junior and Senior years they go to Medical Clinicals at several local health care locations. Also in Students senior year they can acquire certifications in EKG, PCT, and NSCHE.

== Clubs and extracurricular activities ==
•African American Male Leadership

•Choir

•Color Guard

•Ceramics Club

•Dance Team

•Debate Club

•Drama Club

·Fellowship of Christian Athletes (FCA)

•Future Problem Solvers

•Girlfriends

•Gospel Choir

•HOSA (Health Occupations Students of America)

•International Thespians Society

•JAG (Jobs for America's Graduates)

•Jazz Band

•Latino Student Union

•Marching Band

•Pep Band

•Quiz Bowl

•Student Council

•Twirling

== Demographics ==
The 2015-2016 enrollment was 1001, of which 63% were Black, 15% were Hispanic, 11% were White, 8% were Multiracial, and 3% were Asian and Native American.

== Notable alumni ==
- Steve Bagarus, former NFL player
- Brett Banasiewicz, professional BMX rider
- Jacqueline Batteast, former WNBA player, class of 2001
- Gehrig Dieter, NFL player for the Kansas City Chiefs, class of 2012
- Skylar Diggins, WNBA player, 7× All-Star, Olympic Champion, class of 2009
- Fate Echols, NFL player
- Ron Fellows, former NFL player, class of 1977
- Joel Finch, former professional baseball player (Boston Red Sox), class of 1974
- Ed Hanyzewski, former professional baseball player (Chicago Cubs)
- John Kovatch, former NFL player
- Marv Matuszak, former NFL player
- Bob Otolski, former Illinois State head football coach, Indiana Football Hall of Fame member
- Ron Przybylinski, meteorologist
- Junior Walker, saxophonist and Motown Records recording artist
- Casimir Witucki, former NFL player
- Ernie Zalejski, football player

== See also ==
- List of high schools in Indiana
