= Lincoln Township, Indiana =

Lincoln Township is the name of five townships in the U.S. state of Indiana:

- Lincoln Township, Hendricks County, Indiana
- Lincoln Township, LaPorte County, Indiana
- Lincoln Township, Newton County, Indiana
- Lincoln Township, St. Joseph County, Indiana
- Lincoln Township, White County, Indiana
