= Northern Indiana Athletic Conference =

Northern Indiana Conference
- Founded: 1927
- No. of teams: 1 Class 6 A, 2 Class 5A, 5 Class 4A, 4 Class 3A, 1 Class 2A
- Region: North Central Indiana

Locations
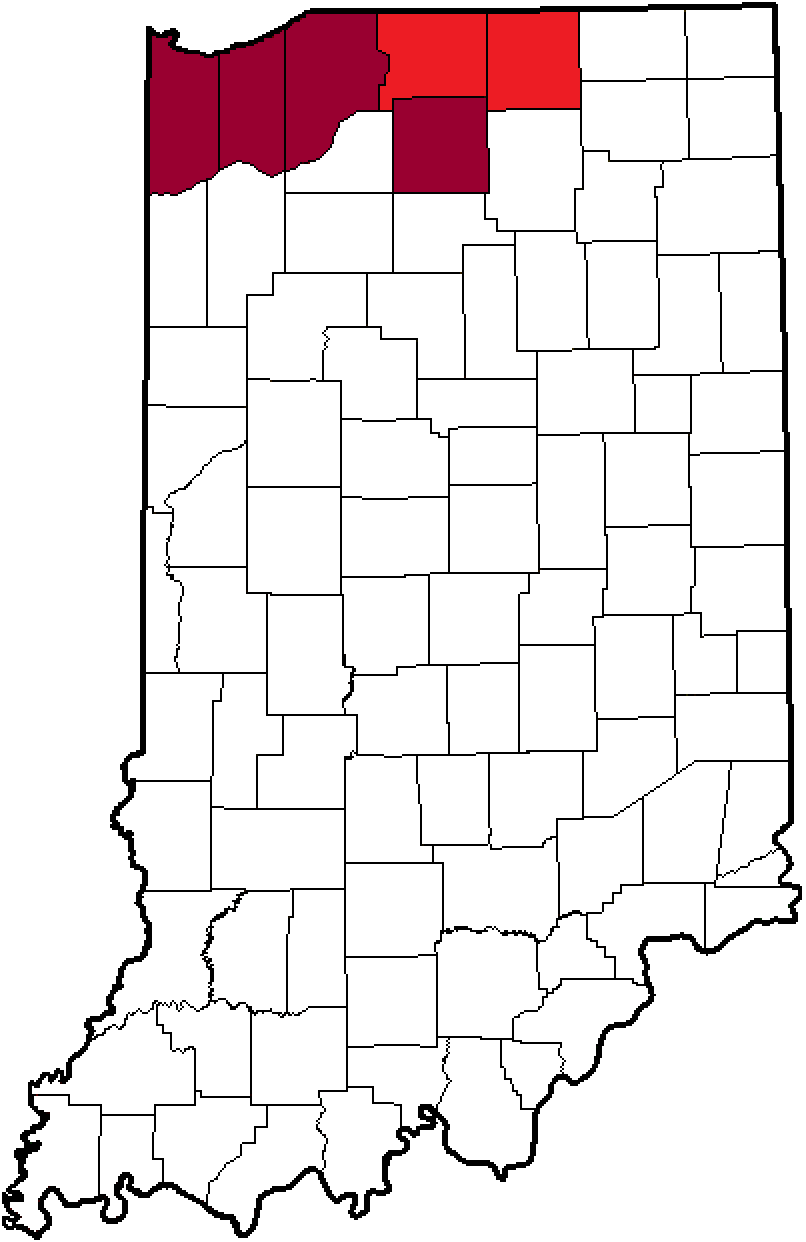
- The Northern Indiana Conference in Indiana. Current Areas are in red, Former Areas are in Maroon

The Northern Indiana Conference (NIC) is a high school athletic conference that was founded in 1927 and spans from as far west as Hammond and Gary to South Bend/Mishawaka and Elkhart to the east and south to Plymouth. Since its start in 1927, a total of 32 separate schools have at one time called the NIC home. From its inception until 1963, the conference had been divided into East and West divisions. The West Division (as well as Valparaiso) left to form the Northwestern Conference in 1963. With membership dwindling to 7 members by the 1970s, the conference added former members of the Northern Indiana Valley Conference to its ranks. Currently, every former NIVC member is now a part of the NIC except for South Bend Jackson, which closed in 1973, and South Bend LaSalle, which joined the NIC in 1977 but closed in 2001.

== History ==
Like the Southern Indiana Athletic Conference, the NIAC was also a superconference that spanned several counties, and a lot of driving miles, for a period between 1940 and 1965. Throughout the 1970s, the membership dwindled as many schools left to form new conferences. From 1995 to 2015, the two conferences shared the same setup with 7 or 8 schools in one county, 8 in this case from St. Joseph County and 1 from an adjacent county, Elkhart in this case. This will change in 2015, as four schools from the folding Northern State Conference will join, making a 13-school conference. This will also expand the conference footprint into two counties formerly represented in the NIAC: LaPorte (last represented in 1995) and Marshall (last represented in 1930). 2020 will bring more change, as Elkhart Central merges with former member Elkhart Memorial to form Elkhart High School, and Mishawaka leaves for the Northern Lakes Conference, taking Memorial's spot in that league.

== Sponsored Sports ==
=== Boys ===
Baseball, Basketball, Cross Country, Football, Golf, Soccer, Swimming & Diving, Tennis, Track & Field, Wrestling

=== Girls ===
Basketball, Cross Country, Golf, Gymnastics, Soccer, Softball, Swimming & Diving, Tennis, Track & Field, Volleyball

== Current members ==
School	Location	Mascot	Colors	County	Enrollment 24–25 IHSAA Class	Joined	Previous Conference
Elkhart^{1}	Elkhart	Lions		20; Elkhart	3,166; 4A	2020	Elkhart County
Mishawaka; Marian	Mishawaka	Knights		71; St. Joseph	735; 3A	2005	Independents (NIVC 1978)
New; Prairie	New; Carlisle	Cougars		46; LaPorte	970; 3A	2015	Northern State
Penn^{2}	Mishawaka	Kingsmen		71; St. Joseph	3,480; 4A	1974	Northern IN Valley
South Bend; Adams	South Bend	Eagles		71; St. Joseph	2,062; 4A	1941	none (new school)
South Bend; Riley	South Bend	Wildcats		71; St. Joseph	1,298; 4A	1931	Independent (School Opened in 1924)
South Bend; Saint Joseph^{3}	South Bend	Huskies		71; St. Joseph	849; 3A	2005	Independents (NIVC 1978)
South Bend; Washington	South Bend	Panthers		71; St. Joseph	886; 3A	1938	none (new school)

1. Elkhart was known as Elkhart Central between 1972 and 2020. In 2020, Elkhart Central consolidated with Elkhart Memorial.
2. Played concurrently in NIC and NIVC 1974–78.
3. South Bend Saint Joseph was known as South Bend St. Joseph's until 2012.

== Former members ==
School	Location	Mascot	Colors	County	Joined	Previous Conference	Left	Conference joined
East Chicago Washington^{1}	East Chicago	Senators		45; Lake	1927	Independents	1963	Northwestern
Gary Emerson	Gary	Golden Tornadoes		45; Lake	1927	Independents	1963	Northwestern
Gary Froebel	Gary	Blue Devils		45; Lake	1927	Independents	1963	Northwestern
Gary Mann	Gary	Horsemen		45; Lake	1927	Independents	1963	Northwestern
Goshen	Goshen	Redskins		20; Elkhart	1927	Elkhart County	1969	Independents
Hammond	Hammond	Wildcats		45; Lake	1927	Independents	1963	Northwestern
La Porte	LaPorte	Slicers		46; La Porte	1927	Independents	1976	Duneland
Michigan City Elston^{2}	Michigan City	Red Devils		46; La Porte	1927	Independents	1995	none (consolidated into Michigan City)
Plymouth	Plymouth	Pilgrims		50; Marshall	1927	Independents	1930	Independents
South Bend Central^{3}	South Bend	Bears		71; St. Joseph	1927	Independents	1970	none (school closed)
Valparaiso	Valparaiso	Vikings		64; Porter	1927; 1945; 1953	Independents; Independents; Independents	1930; 1948; 1963	Independents; Independents; Northwestern
Whiting	Whiting	Oilers		45; Lake	1927	Independents	1963	Northwestern
East Chicago Roosevelt	East Chicago	Rough Riders		45; Lake	1929	Little 7	1963	Northwestern
Gary Wallace	Gary	Hornets		45; Lake	1935	Little 7	1963	Northwestern
Hammond Tech	Hammond	Tigers		45; Lake	1937	Independents	1963	Northwestern
Gary Tolleston	Gary	Blue Raiders		45; Lake	1941	Independents	1963	Northwestern
Hammond Clark	Hammond	Pioneers		45; Lake	1941	Independents	1963	Northwestern
Fort Wayne North Side^{4}	Fort Wayne	Redskins		02; Allen	1942	Ft. Wayne City Series	1965	Ft. Wayne City Series/Summit
Elkhart Memorial^{5}	Elkhart	Crimson Chargers		20; Elkhart	1972	Northern Indiana Conference	2000	Northern Lakes
Elkhart Central	Elkhart	Blue Blazers		20; Elkhart	1972	Independents	2020	Consolidated into Elkhart
South Bend LaSalle^{6}	South Bend	Lions		71; St. Joseph	1976	Northern IN Valley	2001	none (school closed)
Mishawaka	Mishawaka	Cavemen		71; St. Joseph	1927	Independents	2020	Northern Lakes
Bremen	Bremen	Lions		50; Marshall	2015	Northern State	2024	Northern State
Jimtown	Elkhart	Jimmies		20; Elkhart	2015	Northern State	2024	Northern State
John Glenn	Walkerton	Falcons		71; St. Joseph	2015	Northern State	2024	Northern State
South Bend; Clay	South Bend	Colonials		71; St. Joseph	1978	Independents (NIVC 1978)	2024	none (school closed)

1. East Chicago Washington was known as East Chicago until 1928.
2. Michigan City Elston was known as Michigan City until 1972.
3. South Bend Central was known as South Bend until 1930.
4. Played concurrently in the NIC and FWCS their entire membership in the NIC.
5. Played concurrently in the NIC and NLC 1999–2000.
6. Played concurrently in the NIC and NIVC 1976–78.

== Rivalries ==
Main rivalries:

- Riley Wildcats vs. Penn Kingsmen
- Penn Kingsmen vs. Mishawaka Cavemen* (often called "The Backyard Brawl")
- St. Joseph High School vs. Marian Knights (often called "The Holy War")
- Riley Wildcats vs. Adams Eagles
- New Prairie Cougars vs. La Porte* Slicers

Notable sub-rivalries

- St. Joseph vs. Penn
- Riley vs. Marian (often called "The South Side Brawl")
- Marian vs. Mishawaka* (often called "The Civil War")
- Mishawaka* vs. Washington
- Marian vs. Penn (baseball only)
- St. Joseph vs. Culver Military Academy (hockey and lacrosse only)*°
- Mishawaka vs. Adams (basketball only)

Former rivalries

- Elkhart Central Blue Blazers vs. Elkhart Memorial Crimson Chargers* (often called "The Battle of Elkhart")
- Lasalle vs Washington
- Bremen Lions vs. Jimtown Jimmies (Rivalry published in November 1994 issue of Sports Illustrated magazine "Unrivaled Rivalries")
- Clay Colonials vs. Washington Panthers
- Riley vs. Clay
- Adams vs. Clay
- Jimtown vs. NorthWood* (often called "The Border War")
- Bremen vs. Triton* (also often called "The Border War")
- St. Joseph vs. Clay
- Mishawaka vs. Clay (football only).

(Asterisk indicates non-member of NIC)

(Degree indicates a non-NIC sanctioned sport)

== State championships ==
=== Bremen (3) ===
- 1989 Football (A)
- 1994 Football (2A)
- 2019 Softball (2A)

=== Elkhart Central (6) ===
- 1968 Wrestling
- 1969 Boys Track
- 1973 Boys Cross Country
- 1979 Boys Golf
- 1993 Boys Track
- 2012 Baseball (4A)

=== Jimtown (6) ===
- 1974 Boys Gymnastics
- 1991 Football (A)
- 1997 Football (2A)
- 1998 Football (2A)
- 2004 Boys Basketball (2A)
- 2005 Football (2A)

=== Mishawaka (7) ===
- 1946 Boys Cross Country
- 1980 Volleyball
- 1983 Volleyball
- 1988 Volleyball
- 1991 Wrestling
- 2008 Wrestling
- 2010 Wrestling

=== Mishawaka Marian (12) ===
- 1973 Volleyball
- 1973 Football (A)
- 1975 Football (2A)
- 1976 Football (2A)
- 2001 Boys Golf
- 1999 Boys Hockey
- 2001 Boys Hockey
- 2010 Boys Hockey
- 2012 Girls Soccer (A)
- 2015 Boys Soccer (A)
- 2016 Boys Soccer (A)
- 2023 Boys Soccer (2A)

=== New Prairie (2) ===
- 2023 Softball (3A)
- 2024 Baseball (3A)

=== Penn (24) ===
- 1983 Football (4A)
- 1994 Baseball
- 1994 Girls Golf
- 1995 Football (5A)
- 1996 Football (5A)
- 1997 Football (5A)
- 1998 Baseball (4A)
- 1999 Softball (3A)
- 1999 Boys Soccer
- 2000 Football (5A)
- 2001 Baseball (4A)
- 2002 Girls Golf
- 2004 Girls Golf
- 2005 Girls Golf
- 2010 Volleyball (4A)
- 2011 Volleyball (4A)
- 2015 Wrestling
- 2015 Baseball (4A)
- 2016 Girls Basketball (4A)
- 2016 Girls Soccer (2A)
- 2017 Girls Soccer (3A)
- 2022 Baseball (4A)
- 2023 Softball (4A)
- 2023 Baseball (4A)

=== South Bend Adams (8) ===
- 1966 Boys Swimming & Diving
- 1966 Wrestling
- 1967 Boys Swimming & Diving
- 1968 Boys Swimming & Diving
- 1973 Boys Golf
- 1974 Boys Tennis
- 1976 Volleyball
- 1978 Volleyball

=== South Bend Clay (2) ===
- 1970 Baseball
- 1994 Boys Basketball

=== South Bend Riley (10) ===
- 1938 Boys Golf
- 1956 Boys Swimming & Diving
- 1957 Boys Swimming & Diving
- 1958 Boys Swimming & Diving
- 1962 Boys Swimming & Diving
- 1962 Boys Golf
- 1964 Boys Golf
- 1978 Boys Swimming & Diving
- 1986 Boys Swimming & Diving
- 1995 Boys Swimming & Diving

=== South Bend St. Joseph (13) ===
- 1972 Volleyball
- 1975 Girls Tennis
- 1995 Football (3A)
- 1998 Girls Soccer
- 2003 Boys Soccer
- 2005 Girls Basketball (3A)
- 2010 Girls Tennis
- 2010 Girls Soccer
- 2017 Girls Basketball (3A)
- 2017 Baseball (3A)
- 2022 Softball
- 2022 Boys Lacrosse
- 2025 Boys Basketball (3A)

=== South Bend Washington (3) ===
- 1973 Football (3A)
- 2007 Girls Basketball (4A)
- 2022 Girls Basketball (3A)

== See also ==
- Hoosier Hysteria
- Largest high school gyms in the United States

== Related links ==
- Northern Indiana Football History
- Indiana High School Athletic Association
- List of high school athletic conferences in Indiana
- Indiana big school football champions

== Conference champions ==
- Basketball Champions
- Football Champions
