= South Bend Community School Corporation =

School district in Indiana, United States

South Bend Community School Corporation (SBCSC)
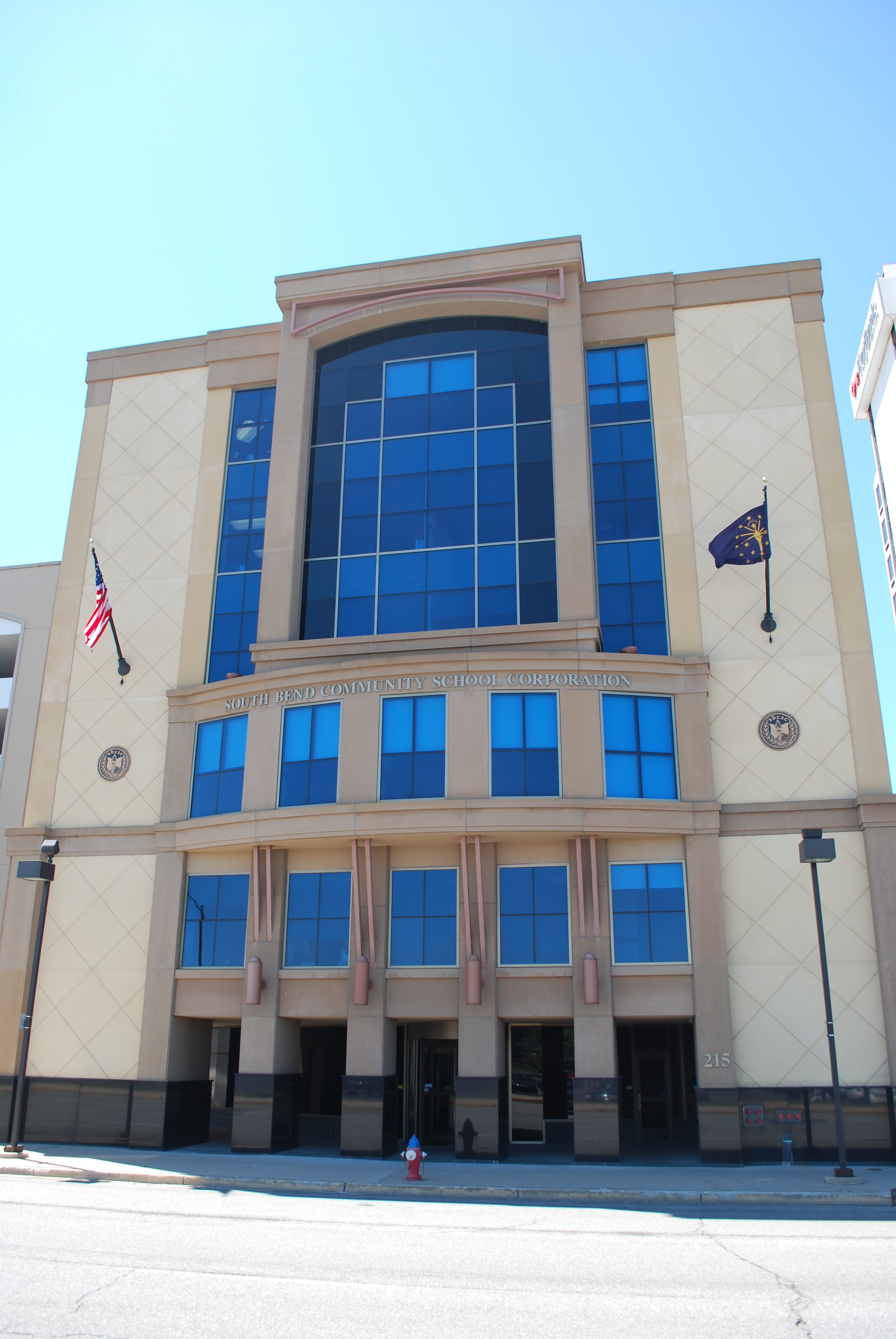
- Former headquarters (now owned by the city government)

Location
- 737 Beale St., South Bend, Indiana 46616 City of South Bend
- Coordinates: 41°40′28.2″N 86°14′56.2″W

District information
- Type: Public School Corporation
- Grades: K–12
- Established: 1867
- Superintendent: Mansour Eid

Students and staff
- Students: 18,110
- Teachers: 884
- Staff: 2,010
- Athletic conference: NIC
- District mascot: Adams Eagles; Riley Wildcats; Washington Panthers

Other information
- 2016 Graduation Rate: 83.8%
- Website: www.sb.school

South Bend Community School Corporation (SBCSC), located in South Bend, Indiana, United States, is St. Joseph County's oldest and largest school corporation, and the fifth largest in the state. The district has 27 schools and seven support facilities in a geographical area covering 160 square miles (410 km^{2}).

It serves most of South Bend, Indian Village, Notre Dame, and Roseland, as well as portions of Granger and Mishawaka.

== History ==
In 2018, residents of Greene Township began plans to join the John Glenn School Corporation and leave the South Bend corporation, partly because the Greene Intermediate Center, the district's final school in the township, closed in 2018, with the parents anticipating a reopening under new management. At first, the South Bend district did not approve of the plan, but in 2022 began talks on how to let Greene Township move to John Glenn.

== Schools ==
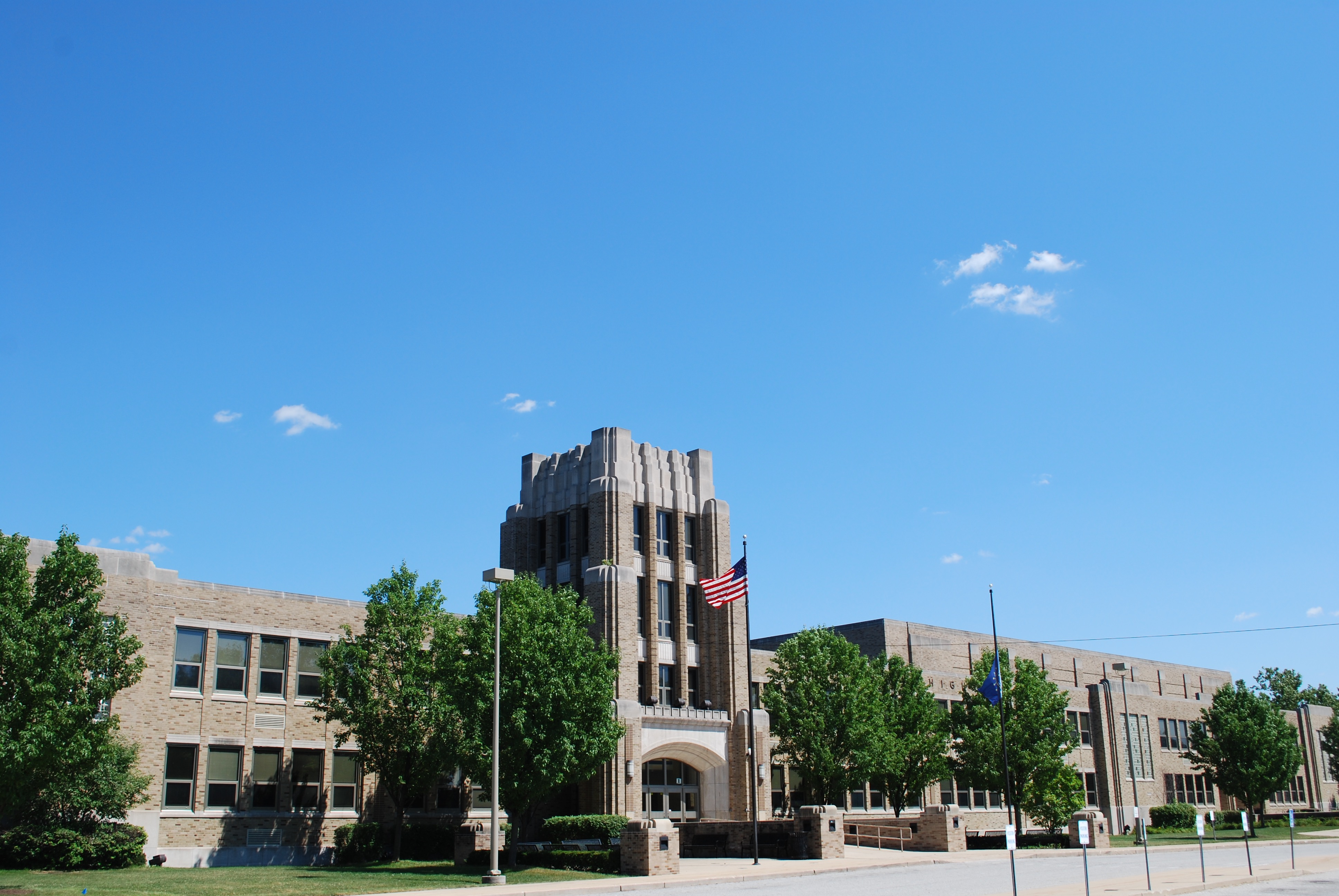
John Adams High School.

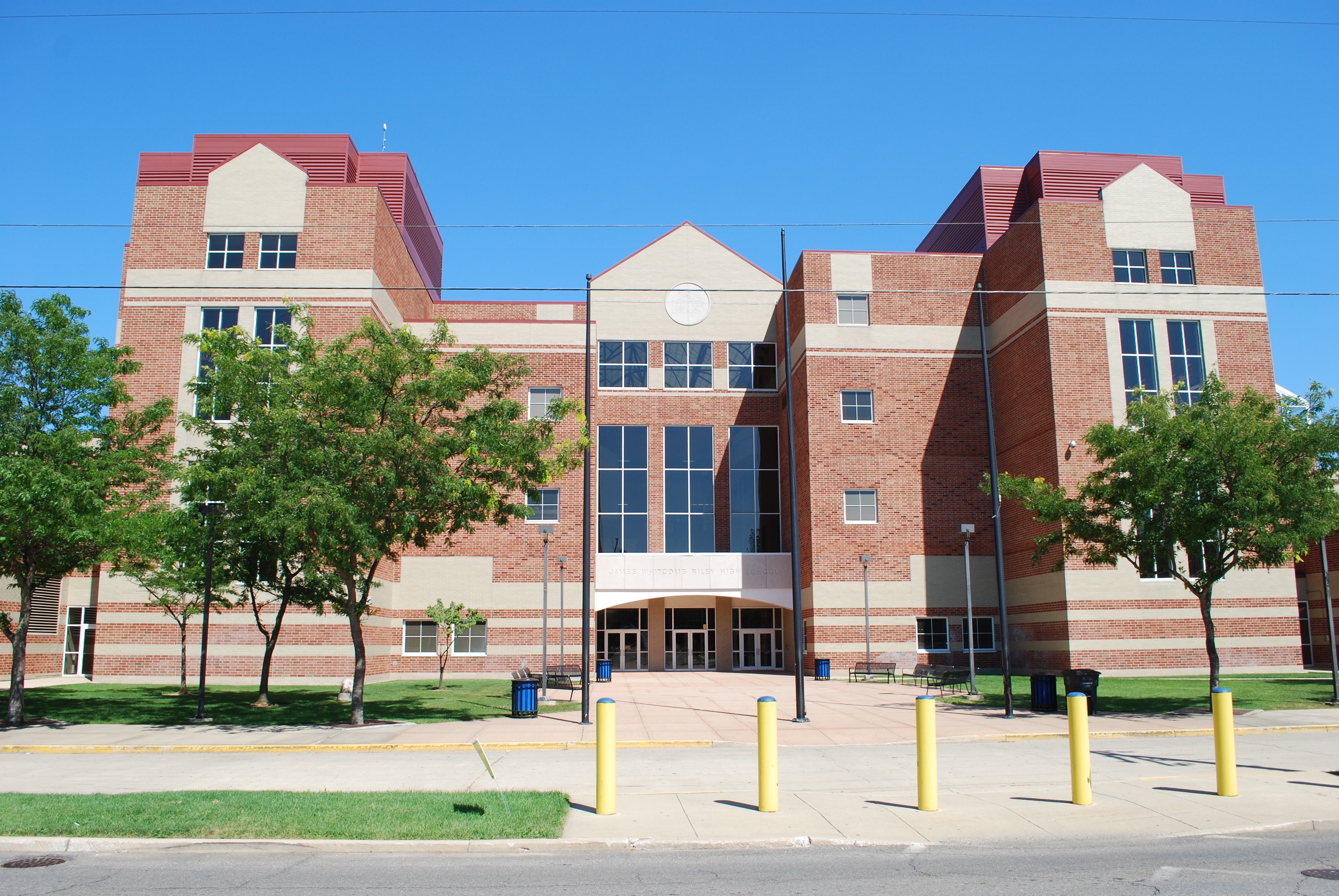
Riley High School South Bend.

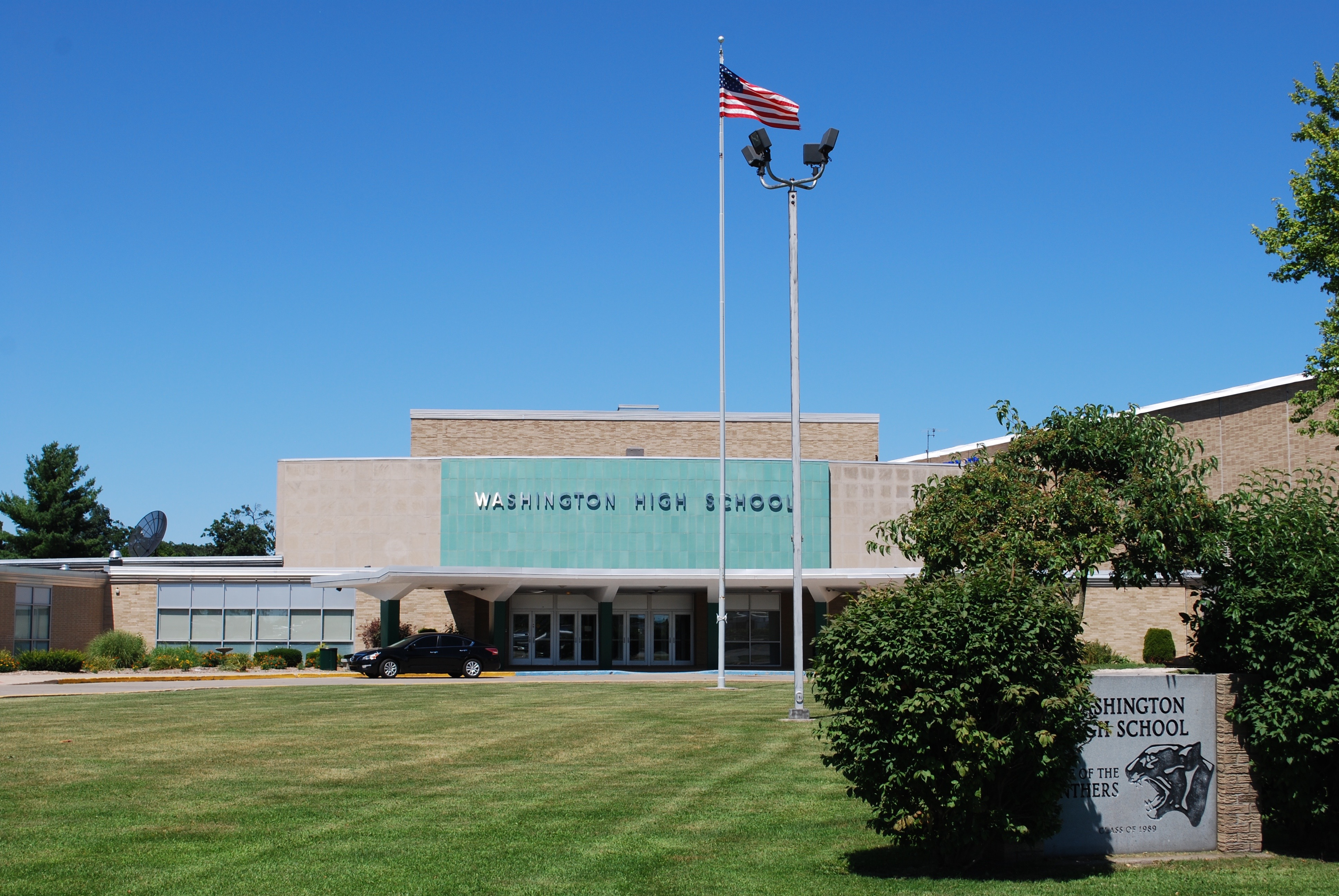
Washington High School South Bend.

=== High schools ===
- John Adams High School
- James Whitcomb Riley High School
- Washington High School
- Rise Up Academy
- South Bend Virtual School

=== K–8 Schools ===
- Clay International Academy
- Edison K–8 School
- Marshall Traditional School
- Marquette Montessori Academy

=== Middle Schools ===
- Dickinson Academy
- Jackson Middle School
- Jefferson Traditional School
- LaSalle Academy
- Navarre Middle School

=== Elementary Schools ===
- Coquillard Elementary School
- Darden Elementary School
- Harrison Elementary School
- Kennedy Academy
- Lincoln Elementary School
- Madison STEAM Academy
- McKinley Elementary School
- Monroe Elementary School
- Muessel Elementary School
- Nuner Fine Arts Academy
- Swanson Traditional School
- Wilson Elementary School

=== Former schools ===
- Andrew Jackson High School was built in 1964 and opened in 1965, with the first graduation in 1967. It was located at 5001 South Miami Road at the corner of Jackson Road. It became Andrew Jackson Intermediate Center, a middle school, in 1975.
- South Bend Central High School – Closed in 1970.
- Clay High School – Closed following the 2023–2024 school year.
- LaSalle High School – Converted to LaSalle Academy in 2004.
- Brown Intermediate Center – Closed in 2018.
- Greene Intermediate Center – Greene Township – It started in 1930 as Greene Township School, with what became the western wing, as a grade 1–12 school. It had an enrollment exceeding 600 in the 1950s. It ended high school classes due to a lower number of students. In 2018, when it closed, its enrollment was 181, with some of the students living in South Bend, and it was the district's final school in the township.
- Hay Primary Center – Closed in 2021 – Students were divided between Monroe Elementary School and Wilson Elementary School Four board members voted to close Hay while three voted against. Hay's enrollment was below 50% of the official capacity of the school.
- Tarkington Traditional School – Closed in 2021, with most students reassigned to Darden Elementary Five board members voted to close Tarkington while two voted against. The school was using under 60% of its official capacity.

== Facilities ==
The administrative headquarters are in the Brown Community Learning Center. In 2022 the district was to sell its previous headquarters to the city government, then rent and use it until 2024.

From circa 1970 to 2006, the district had its headquarters in a former Studebaker building. In the summer of 2006 the district was to move into another headquarters building near Century Center.

== Superintendent ==
The current superintendent of South Bend Community School Corporation is Mansour Eid. He was hired as an interim superintendent in March 2025. Previous superintendent Todd Cummings was placed on administrative leave due to controversy stemming from a snow day. Cummings also came under fire for embellishing his resume and allowing widespread academic fraud. He was hired in 2019 to replace Dr. Kenneth Spells. Dr. Carole Schmidt, was the district's superintendent from 2011 to 2016. She replaced former superintendent James Kapsa who ran the district from 2008 to 2011. James Kapsa replaced Dr. Robert Zimmerman who was superintendent from 2006 to 2008.

From 2001 to 2006 the superintendent was Dr. Joan Raymond. Superintendent Raymond is noted for implementing the Plan Z restructuring program. Preceding Joan Raymond was Dr. Virginia Calvin who was known for creating the new Riley High School which was supposed to rejuvenate the neighborhood surrounding the school.

== Plan Z ==
The 2003–2004 school year marked the first year Plan Z was launched. This plan led to a restructuring and a redistricting of students around the South Bend area. Under Plan Z, the schools were reorganized into: Primary schools which serve K–4 and Intermediate Centers that serves 5–8. The high schools adopted a magnet program within their schools, as well as their regular curriculum program open to their district boundaries. These Magnet programs are available to any student, regardless of home school boundary, who applies for entry. The current magnet programs are: Adams- Global Studies/International Baccalaureate, Riley- Technology and Engineering, Clay- Visual and Performing Arts, and Washington- Medical/Allied Health Sciences. LaSalle was closed as a high school, and replaced as a high achieving Intermediate Academy for grades 5–8. Kennedy Elementary became the high achieving magnet school, Kennedy Primary Academy. Tarkington Elementary became a Traditional Primary Magnet school. The success of these magnet schools would later inspire an expansion of more magnet schools available: Hamilton Traditional Primary, Coquillard Primary Traditional School, Perley Primary Fine Arts Academy, Marquette Primary Montessori, Jefferson Traditional Intermediate, Dickinson Fine Arts Intermediate, and soon to be created Jackson Project Lead the Way Intermediate school for the 2017–2018 school year. There are also programs that are not yet considered Magnet programs, such as Madison STEAM Primary, New Tech high school, and Brown Montessori. The vision of Plan Z, was to create schools zones that made sense logistically, as well as provide choices and opportunities for the SBCSC families.

== Athletics ==
As of 2015, there are grade point averages that student athletes must keep in order to remain eligible to play on their sports teams. For first year students (freshmen) it is 1.5, for second year students (sophomores) it is 1.67, for third year students (juniors) it is 1.85, and for fourth year students (seniors) it is 2.0. Prior to August 2015 students from all grade levels had to maintain a 2.0, but that month the board voted to relax the GPA standards.

South Bend Community School Corporation has accumulated 22 IHSAA State Champion Teams.

South Bend Adams (8) 1966 Boys Swimming & Diving, 1966 Wrestling, 1967 Boys Swimming & Diving, 1968 Boys Swimming & Diving, 1973 Boys Golf, 1974 Boys Tennis, 1976 Volleyball, 1978 Volleyball

South Bend Clay (2) 1970 Baseball, 1994 Boys Basketball

South Bend Riley (10) 1938 Boys Golf, 1956 Boys Swimming & Diving, 1957 Boys Swimming & Diving, 1958 Boys Swimming & Diving, 1962 Boys Swimming & Diving, 1962 Boys Golf, 1964 Boys Golf, 1978 Boys Swimming & Diving, 1986 Boys Swimming & Diving

South Bend Washington (2) 1973 Football (3A), 2007 Girls Basketball (4A)
