= North Liberty Historic District =

Historic district in Indiana, United States

- U.S. National Register of Historic Places
- U.S. Historic district
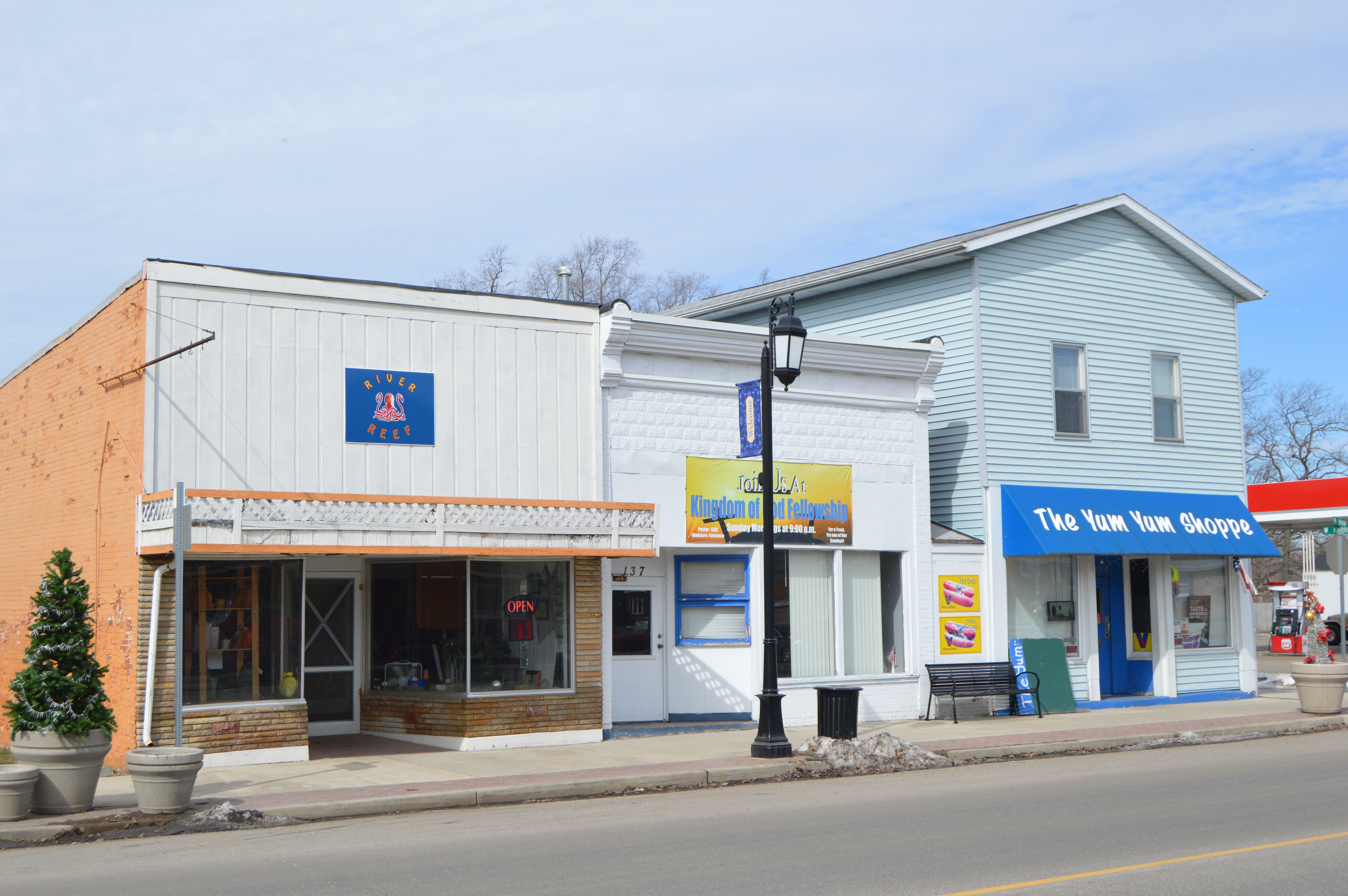
- Main in downtown North Liberty, March 2015

- Location within Indiana Location within the United States
- Location: State Road 23 between Center and Harrison Sts., North Liberty, Indiana
- Coordinates: 41°32′07″N 86°25′37″W
- Area: 4.1 acres (1.7 ha)
- Built: 1892-1960
- Architectural style: Italianate, Classical Revival, Art Moderne
- NRHP reference No.: 14000077
- Added to NRHP: March 26, 2014

North Liberty Historic District is a national historic district located at North Liberty, Indiana. The district encompasses 14 contributing buildings in the central business district of North Liberty. It was developed between about 1880 and 1960, and includes examples of Italianate, Classical Revival, and Art Moderne architecture. Notable buildings include the Worter Building (1892), Finch Block (c. 1900), Hoffman Block (c. 1885), L.W. Pommert Building (1920), North Liberty City Hall (1915), Masonic Hall (c. 1925), Community State Bank (1960), Starr Grocery (c. 1911), North Liberty State Bank (c. 1911), Service Garage (c. 1935), and Modern Speed Wash (1960).

It was listed on the National Register of Historic Places in 2014.
