= Cas Witucki =

American football player (1928–2015)

No. 62, 63
- Position: Guard

Personal information
- Born: May 26, 1928; South Bend, Indiana, U.S.
- Died: April 19, 2015 (aged 86); Charlotte Hall, Maryland, U.S.
- Listed height: 5 ft 11 in (1.80 m)
- Listed weight: 245 lb (111 kg)

Career information
- High school: Washington (South Bend)
- College: Indiana (1946–1949)
- NFL draft: 1950: 21st round, 266th overall pick

Career history
- Washington Redskins (1950–1951, 1953–1954); Toronto Argonauts (1955); Washington Redskins (1955–1956)

Career NFL statistics
- Games played: 54
- Games started: 35
- Fumble recoveries: 4
- Stats at Pro Football Reference

Casimir "Slug" Leo Witucki (May 26, 1928 – April 19, 2015) was an American professional football guard in the National Football League (NFL) for the Washington Redskins. He played college football at Indiana University and was selected in the 21st round of the 1950 NFL draft.

== Early life ==
Witucki was born in South Bend, Indiana and attended Washington High School. While there, he played high school football as a guard on teams that went 14–1–4 in 1944 and 1945. He was awarded All-State honors and was chosen captain in 1945.

== College career ==
Witucki attended and played college football at Indiana University in Bloomington. He was a four-year letterman and graduated in 1950.

== Professional career ==
Witucki was selected in the 21st round (266th overall) of the 1950 NFL draft by the Washington Redskins. He played for the Redskins in 1950 and 1951, and after military service, from 1953 to 1956.

== Military service ==
Witucki missed the 1952 NFL season because he was called to duty in the United States Air Force during the Korean War. He was awarded the rank of second lieutenant and was stationed in Japan. While he was stationed at Ashiya Air Field, he played football for the Ashiya Mustangs.

== Personal life ==
Witucki died April 19, 2015, at Charlotte Hall Veteran's Home, in Charlotte Hall, Maryland.
