= Jimtown High School =

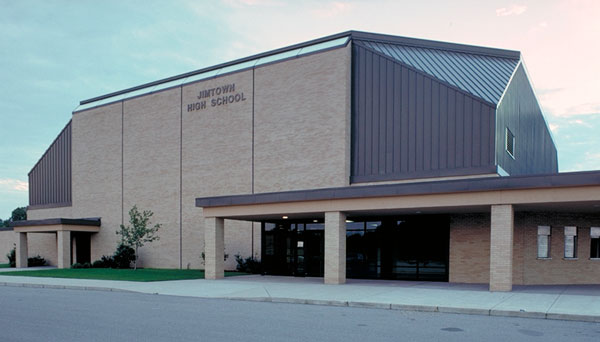

Location
- 59021 County Road 3 South; Elkhart, Elkhart County, IN 46517; United States
- 41°38′13″N 86°1′27″W

Information
- Type: Public high school
- School district: Baugo Community Schools
- Principal: Tim Pletcher
- Teaching staff: 37.67 (FTE)
- Grades: 9-12
- Enrollment: 538 (2023-2024)
- Student to teacher ratio: 14.28
- Color
- Athletics conference: Northern Indiana Athletic Conference
- Team name: Jimmies
- Website: School website

Jimtown High School is located in Elkhart, Indiana, United States. It is in Baugo Township, and a part of the Baugo Community Schools system.

== Athletics ==
The Jimtown football team has won four state titles (1991–1992, 1997–1998, 1998–1999, and 2005–2006). Jimtown has been arch-rivals with Concord High School since the program started in 1955, and the series is (as of 2008) tied 24–24. The Jimmies play at Knepp Field. The Jimtown basketball team won the 2A state championship in 2003–2004.

== See also ==
- List of high schools in Indiana
