= Northern Indiana Conference Basketball Champions =

Basketball conference in Indiana

Season	School	Conference Record
1937	South Bend Central	N/A
1938	Elkhart	N/A
1939	South Bend Central	N/A
1940	Mishawaka	N/A
1941	South Bend Central	N/A
1942	South Bend Central	N/A
1943	South Bend Central	N/A
1944	Elkhart	N/A
1945	South Bend Riley	N/A
1946	Elkhart	N/A
1947	LaPorte; South Bend Central	N/A
1948	LaPorte	9-0
1949	Mishawaka; South Bend Central	8-1
1950	South Bend Central	9-0
1951	Elkhart	9-0
1952	Elkhart	8-1
1953	South Bend Central	8-1
1954	Fort Wayne North Side	8-1
1955	South Bend Washington	8-1
1956	Elkhart	8-1
1957	South Bend Central	9-0
1958	Michigan City; South Bend Central	8-1
1959	Michigan City	9-0
1960	South Bend Adams	8-1
1961	Michigan City	9-0
1962	South Bend Central	8-1
1963	Goshen; South Bend Central	8-1
1964	Elkhart	8-1
1965	Michigan City; South Bend Central	8-1
1966	Michigan City; South Bend Central	8-1
1967	Michigan City	8-0
1968	Elkhart; Michigan City	7-1
1969	Goshen; Michigan City	7-1
1970	South Bend Adams	7-0
1971	Michigan City; South Bend Adams	5-1
1972	Michigan City	6-0
1973	South Bend Riley	7-0
1974	South Bend Adams	7-0
1975	Michigan City Elston; Penn; South Bend Adams	6-1
1976	Elkhart Central	7-0
1977	South Bend Washington	8-0
1978	South Bend Adams	8-0
1979	South Bend Adams	9-0
1980	South Bend LaSalle	9-0
1981	Elkhart Memorial; South Bend LaSalle	8-1
1982	Elkhart Memorial	7-2
1983	Elkhart Memorial; Michigan City Elston	7-2
1984	Elkhart Memorial	8-1
1985	South Bend Adams; South Bend Clay	7-2
1986	Michigan City Elston	9-0
1987	Penn; South Bend Riley	8-1
1988	Elkhart Memorial; Penn	7-2
1989	South Bend Adams; South Bend Clay	8-1
1990	South Bend Riley	8-1
1991	South Bend Riley	8-1
1992	Michigan City Elston	9-0
1993	Elkhart Central; South Bend Clay	7-2
1994	Elkhart Central	9-0
1995	South Bend Clay	9-0
1996	South Bend Clay	7-1
1997	Penn	6-2
1998	South Bend Clay; South Bend Washington	6-2
1999	Elkhart Central; South Bend Washington	6-2
2000	Penn	8-0
2001	Penn	7-0
2002	South Bend Washington	6-1
2003	Elkhart Central; Penn	6-1
2004	Penn	8-0
2005	Elkhart Central; Mishawaka; Penn	7-1
2006	Penn	8-0
2007	South Bend St. Joe; Penn	7-1
2008	South Bend Riley; South Bend St. Joe; South Bend Washington	6-2
2009	South Bend Washington; South Bend Clay	7-1
2010	South Bend Riley	8-0
2011	South Bend Riley; Mishawaka Marian	6-2
2012	South Bend Washington	8-0
2013	South Bend Adams; Penn	7-1
2014	Penn	7-1
2015	Mishawaka Marian	8-0
2016	South Bend Washington	12-0
2017	South Bend Riley; South Bend Adams	11-1
2018	South Bend Riley	12-0
2019	Penn; Mishawaka Marian; South Bend Riley	11-1

== See also ==
- Northern Indiana Conference
