= Lincoln Township, St. Joseph County, Indiana =

Lincoln Township
- Township
- Location in St. Joseph County
- Coordinates: 41°28′55″N 86°29′08″W
- Country: United States
- State: Indiana
- County: St. Joseph

Government
  - Type: Indiana township
  - Trustee: Charles Kulp

Area
  - Total: 22.2 sq mi (57.5 km^{2})
  - Land: 22.19 sq mi (57.47 km^{2})
  - Water: 0.012 sq mi (0.03 km^{2}) 0.05%
- Elevation: 705 ft (215 m)

Population (2020)
  - Total: 2,859
  - Density: 128.8/sq mi (49.75/km^{2})
- Time zone: UTC-5 (Eastern (EST))
  - Summer (DST): UTC-4 (EDT)
- ZIP codes: 46554, 46574
- Area code: 574
- GNIS feature ID: 453573
- Website: www.lincolntwp.org

Lincoln Township is one of thirteen townships in St. Joseph County in the U.S. state of Indiana. As of the 2020 census, its population was 2,859.

== Geography ==
According to the United States Census Bureau, Lincoln Township covers an area of 22.2 square miles (57 km^{2}); of this, 22.19 square miles (57.5 km^{2}) (99.95 percent) is land and 0.01 square miles (0.026 km^{2}) (0.05 percent) is water.

=== Cities, towns, villages ===
- Walkerton

=== Adjacent townships ===
- Liberty Township (northeast)
- Polk Township, Marshall County (southeast)
- Oregon Township, Starke County (southwest)
- Johnson Township, LaPorte County (west)

=== Major highways ===
- US 6
- SR 23
- SR 104

== Education ==
- John Glenn School Corporation

Lincoln Township is served by the Walkerton-Lincoln Township Public Library.

== Political districts ==
- Indiana's 2nd congressional district
- State House District 21
- State Senate District 5
