= John Kovatch =

American football player (1920–2012)

No. 40, 76
- Position: End

Personal information
- Born: July 21, 1920; South Bend, Indiana, U.S.
- Died: August 18, 2012 (aged 92); South Bend, Indiana, U.S.
- Listed height: 6 ft 3 in (1.91 m)
- Listed weight: 197 lb (89 kg)

Career information
- High school: Washington (South Bend)
- College: Notre Dame
- NFL draft: 1942: 13th round, 116th overall pick

Career history
- Washington Redskins (1942, 1946); Green Bay Packers (1947)

Awards and highlights
- NFL champion (1942)

Career NFL statistics
- Receptions: 18
- Receiving yards: 157
- Touchdowns: 1
- Stats at Pro Football Reference

John George Kovatch Jr. (July 21, 1920 – August 18, 2012) was an American professional football end in the National Football League (NFL) for the Washington Redskins and the Green Bay Packers. He was born in South Bend, Indiana. He played college football at the University of Notre Dame and was selected in the 13th round of the 1942 NFL draft.

Kovatch died on August 18, 2012.
