= John Glenn School Corporation =

School district in Indiana, United States

John Glenn School Corporation is a school district headquartered in Walkerton, Indiana. It is named after John Glenn.

It includes Walkerton and North Liberty in St. Joseph County. It also includes territory in Marshall County.

== History ==
In August 2021, during the COVID-19 pandemic in Indiana, the district chose to enact a mask mandate.

In 2018 a movement started where residents of Greene Township advocated for leaving the South Bend Community School Corporation and joining the John Glenn School Corporation. By 2022 the John Glenn District was working to come to an agreement with the South Bend district so a voluntary district change would occur.

== Schools ==
- John Glenn High School (Walkerton)
- Urey Middle School (Walkerton)
- North Liberty Elementary School
- Walkerton Elementary School
