= John Glenn High School (Walkerton, Indiana) =

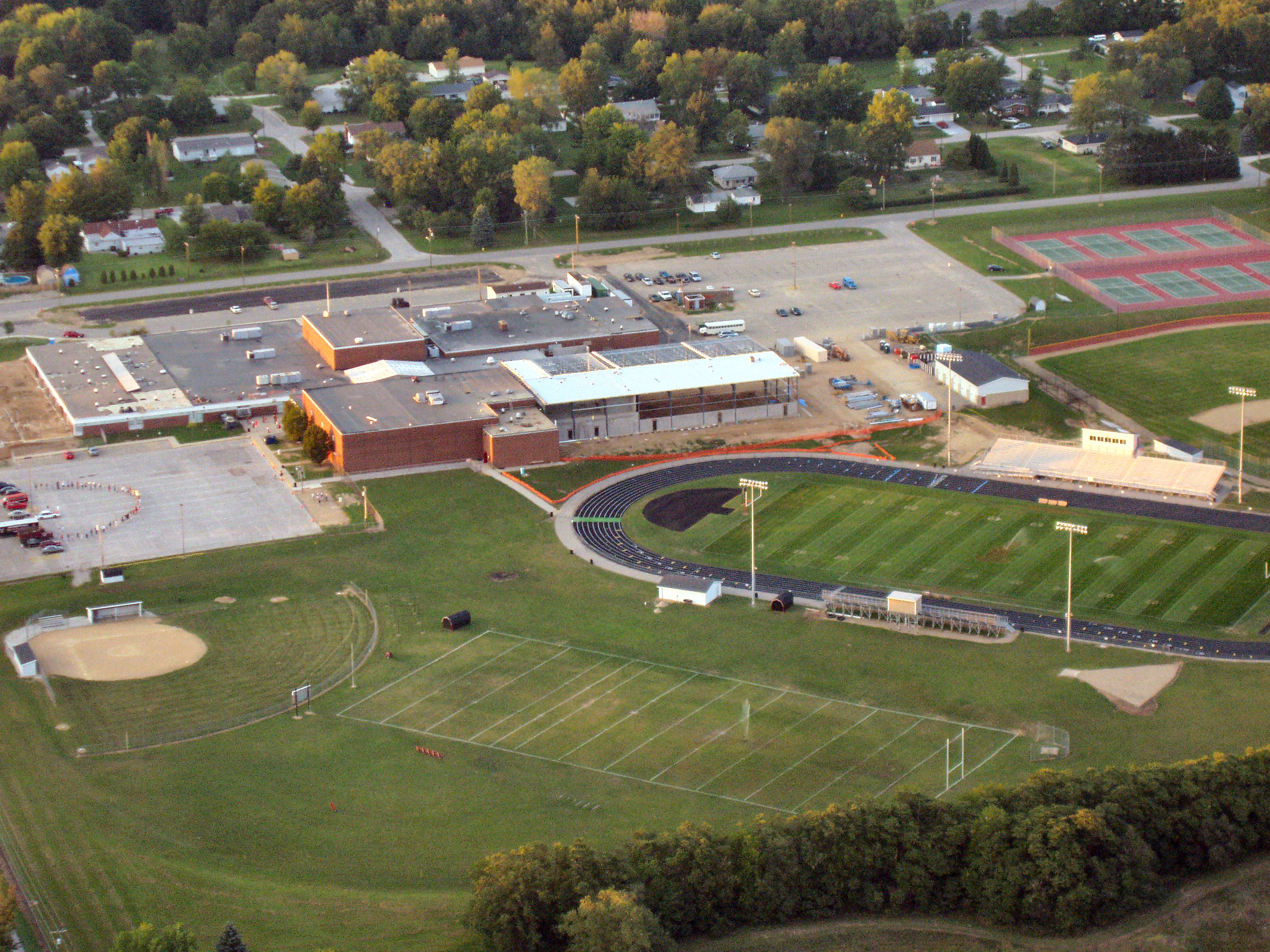
- John Glenn High School from the air

Location
- 201 John Glenn Drive; Walkerton, St. Joseph, Indiana 46574; United States; 41.457545°N 86.479735°W

Information
- Type: Public high school
- Established: 1968
- School district: John Glenn School Corporation
- NCES District ID: 71
- Principal: Chris Manering
- Teaching staff: 44.08 (FTE)
- Grades: 9-12
- Enrollment: 633 (2023-2024)
- Student to teacher ratio: 14.36
- Color
- Fight song: Based on Illinois Loyalty
- Athletics conference: IHSAA District 1 Northern Indiana Conference
- Mascot: Falcon
- Nickname: Glenn
- Team name: Falcons
- Rival: Bremen High School
- Website: Official Website

John Glenn High School is a public high school in Walkerton, Indiana. It is the only high school in the John Glenn School Corporation, which serves Walkerton and North Liberty.

John Glenn High School is a member of the North Central Association of Colleges and Schools (N.C.A.). Credits earned at John Glenn High School are accepted by all high schools and colleges in Indiana and by all schools that are members of the N.C.A. John Glenn has a First Class commissioned rating from the Indiana Department of Public Instruction.

The school was dedicated on October 20, 1968, with NASA astronaut John Glenn, for whom it is named, present. Glenn is said to have delivered an inspiring speech on the occasion.

Glenn has won 18 state spell bowl competitions.

The school's predecessor was Walkerton High School, whose first building was constructed in 1914 and housed all twelve grades. Then in 1942 a new building was constructed and the high school relocated there. When the Glenn school was constructed and occupied, the existing high school building was repurposed as the Harold C. Urey Middle School.

== Academics ==
John Glenn is given a score of 7/10 on greatschools.org. The school has scored higher than the state averages on the End-of-Course-Assessments given by the state of Indiana.

2011 ECA Scores	Algebra I	English	Biology
John Glenn	83%	76%	52%
Indiana	72%	72%	47%

The student-teacher ratio is slightly larger than the state average at 20 (Indiana average is 17) Source: 1NCES, 2008–2009

John Glenn offers 13 AP and college-credit courses including :

- Calculus AB
- Chemistry
- English Literature & Composition
- U.S. Government & Politics
- Physics B

John Glenn offers the following foreign languages: Spanish, Chinese.

=== Student Demographics ===
The ethnic make-up of John Glenn is as follows: (State Averages in parentheses)

White - 92% (73%)

Hispanic - 5% (8%)

Multiracial - 2% (4%)

Black, non-Hispanic - >1% (12%)

Asian - >1% (2%)

Native American - >1% (>1%)

Source: IN Dept. of Education, 2010–2011

Student Sub-groups

Students participating in free or reduced-price lunch program - 31% (47%)

English learners - <1% (5%)

Special education - 7% (15%)

=== Student Activities ===
The following is a list of clubs and activities available for John Glenn High School students. (Taken from the student handbook)

- Academic Decathlon Team
- Drama Club
- Yearbook
- Aerial (literary magazine)
- Spanish Club
- French Club
- Spell Bowl Team
- Art Club
- F.F.A.
- F.C.C.L.A.
- S.A.D.D.
- Student Council
- Chess Club
- Swing Choir
- Jazz Band
- Marching Band
- Concert Band
- Color Guard

The school's literary magazine, The Aerial, was nominated for the highest award in Indiana, but ended up finishing second.

== Athletics ==
John Glenn High School's athletic teams are the Falcons and they are part of the Northern Indiana Athletic Conference in the IHSAA. (In the era of the 1950s and thereabouts the teams were known as the Walkerton Indians.) The school is currently athletic rivals with the inter-conference team Bremen Lions of Bremen High School in Bremen. The Falcons were formerly rivals with the North Liberty Shamrocks; however, this rivalry ended after the two schools merged.

The school offers a wide range of athletics including:

- Baseball
- Softball
- football
- Basketball
- Volleyball
- Golf
- Tennis
- Soccer
- Track and field
- Cross Country

== Notable alumni ==
- Barry L. Houser - band director, current director of the University of Illinois Marching Illini
- Walter LaFeber (class of 1951) − professor of American diplomatic history at Cornell University
- Marci Miller - actress and model, known for portraying Abigail Deveraux on the NBC soap opera Days of Our Lives

== See also ==
- List of high schools in Indiana
