= Bremen High School (Bremen, Indiana) =

Bremen Senior High School
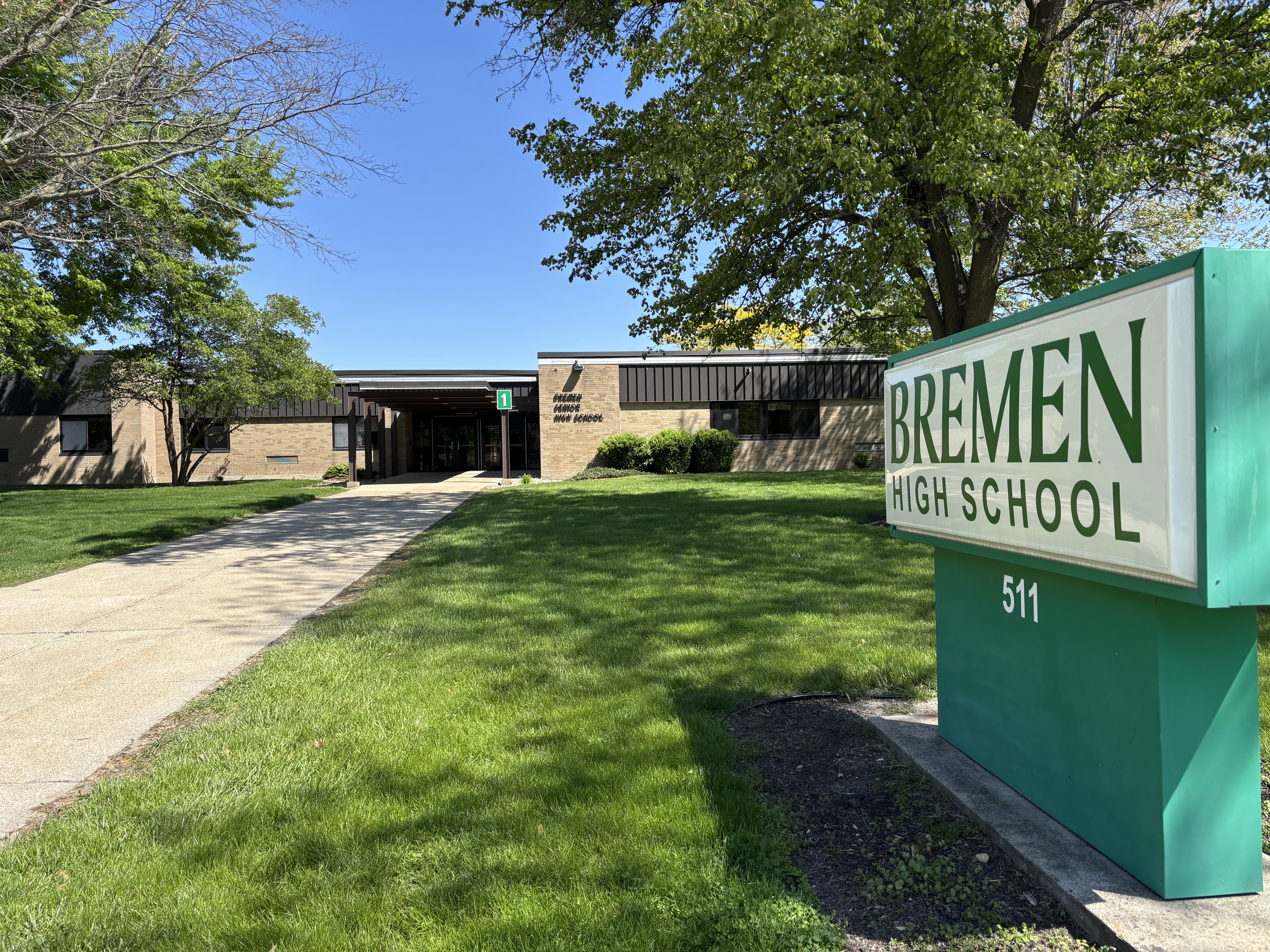
- Bremen High School Entrance, 2026

Location
- 511 West Grant Street; Bremen, Marshall County, Indiana 46506; United States; 41.443639°N 86.152650°W

Information
- Type: Public high school
- Established: 1901; 125 years ago
- School district: Bremen Public Schools
- Superintendent: Dr. Hope Amor
- Principal: Andrew Rohde
- Teaching staff: 32.5 (FTE)
- Grades: 9-12
- Enrollment: 482 (2024-2025)
- Student to teacher ratio: 14.83
- Colors: Green and white
- Athletics conference: Northern Indiana Athletic Conference
- Team name: Lions
- Website: www.bps.k12.in.us/page/school-information

Bremen Senior High School is a public high school located in Bremen, Indiana, United States. It opened in 1901.

== History ==
Bremen has had four different school buildings. The first one was a wood-frame building on the north side of town at the corner of Montgomery and Bike. It then got replaced with a brick building on the same lot. In 1939, a new high school was built at a cost of $250,000. In 1962 the present high school was built. Sixteen years later in 1978, the high school was expanded to include a media center, auditorium, choir and band center, swimming pool, and additional gymnasium.

== Athletics ==
Bremen has a football team dating back to the early 1900s but it was discontinued in 1907 due to risk of serious injuries. The school added football again in 1954.

The Bremen football team won the State Championship in 1989(A) and 1994(AA). The softball team won state in 2019(AA).

Bremen student Payton Ballinger is a competitive armwrestler. Payton won the world championship in the "Junior U-15 Men Right-78 kg" category at the 5th IFA World Armwrestling Championship held in Baku, Azerbaijan, in October 2025.

== Students ==
In 2010, Bremen student Alicia Cauffman submitted a video for a contest sponsored by Seventeen Magazine, the Ultimate Prom, featuring a chance to host musical performers Boys Like Girls at the winning school's senior prom. Cauffman won the contest with her "heartfelt" video submission, and Boys Like Girls performed at the May 8, 2010 Bremen Senior Prom.

== Notable alumni & staff ==
- Dr. Hope Amor, Bremen Public Schools Superintendent
- Don Bunge, football coach 1955–1984, namesake of "Bunge Field"
- Jack Jordan - Indiana House of Representatives for the 17th district
- Salvador Perez-Lopez, clarinetist, participated in Grammy Award winning studio album American Dreamers: Voices of Hope Music of Freedom by John Daversa Big Band
- Christina Stembel, CEO of Farmgirl flowers

== See also ==
- List of high schools in Indiana
