= Marian High School (Indiana) =

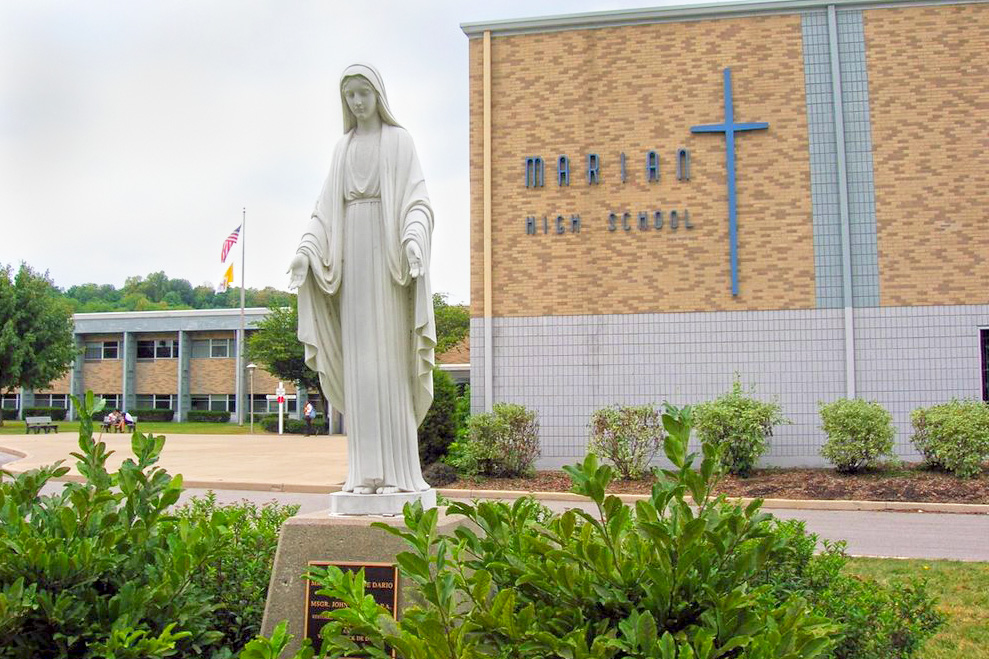

Location
- 1311 South Logan Street; Mishawaka, Indiana 46544; United States; 41°38′59″N 86°11′51″W

Information
- Type: Private; College-preparatory; Catholic school
- Motto: Learn. Serve. Lead.
- Religious affiliation: Roman Catholic
- Patron saint: Our Lady of Lourdes
- Established: 1964
- Founder: Austin Peyla
- Oversight: Diocese of Fort Wayne-South Bend
- CEEB code: 152343
- Principal: Mark Freund
- Teaching staff: 55.0 (on an FTE basis)
- Grades: 9–12
- Gender: Co-ed
- Enrollment: 735 (2023-24)
- Student to teacher ratio: 13.4
- Campus size: 72 acres (29 ha)
- Campus type: Suburban
- Colors: Royal blue, silver & white
- Athletics conference: Northern Indiana Conference
- Nickname: Knights
- Rival: St. Joseph High School
- Accreditation: North Central Association of Colleges and Schools
- Newspaper: The Lance
- Yearbook: Madrigal
- Tuition: Catholic: $10,955; Non-Catholic: $12,795
- Website: www.marianhs.org

Marian High School (also known as Mishawaka Marian) is a private Roman Catholic secondary school in Mishawaka, Indiana, in the United States, operated by the Roman Catholic Diocese of Fort Wayne-South Bend. Marian was a top 50 school in 2005 noted on the Catholic High School Honor Roll. Marian High School holds a First Class commission from the Indiana State Department of Education and has been accredited by the North Central Association since early 1996. Marian received a letter grade of "A" for the 2013–2014 school year from the state. This is the third year that Marian has received this award.

== History ==
Marian High School was founded in 1964 by the Sisters of St. Francis. It was a co-educational school with separation of classes by gender (later changed).

== Academics ==
=== AP and ACP Classes ===
Marian offers 18 Advanced Placement courses which are eligible for college credit. AP courses offered for the 2014–2015 school year include: AP English Language and Composition, AP English Literature and Composition, AP World History: Modern, AP U.S. Government and Politics, AP U.S. History, AP Microeconomics, AP Latin, AP Psychology, AP Calculus-AB, AP Calculus-BC, AP Statistics, AP Biology, AP Chemistry, AP Physics 1, AP Physics C: Mechanics, AP Physics C: Electricity and Magnetism, and AP Studio Art-2D. In addition, Marian offers ACP(Advanced College Project) classes through Indiana University South Bend and non-AP dual credit courses through Ivy Tech Community College of Indiana. These include Biology, Chemistry, Physics, U.S. History, Cadet Teaching, English, and Calculus.

== Athletics ==
Marian is part of the Northern Indiana Conference. Their teams are named the Knights and the school colors are royal blue and silver. The following sports are offered at Marian:

- Baseball (boys)
- Basketball (boys & girls)
- Bowling (boys)
- Cheer (girls)
- Cross country (boys & girls)
- Football (boys)
  - State champion - 1973, 1975, 1976
- Golf (boys & girls)
  - Boys state champion - 2001
- Hockey (boys)
  - State Champion - 1999, 2000, 2025
- Lacrosse (boys)
- Rugby (boys)
  - State Champion - 2000, 2025
- Soccer (boys & girls)
  - Girls state champion - 2012, 2025
  - Boys state champion - 2015, 2016, 2023
- Softball (girls)
- Swimming (boys & girls)
- Tennis (boys & girls)
- Track (boys & girls)
- Volleyball (girls)
  - State champion - 1973
- Wrestling (boys)

== Extracurricular activities ==
=== Band ===
Marian's band includes both pep and concert band, which compete annually in the ISSMA competitions. The band performs during athletic events, as well as holding both a Christmas and Spring concert annually. As of April 2015, the school does not have a marching band.

=== Mock Trial ===
Marian has participated in Indiana High School Mock Trial Association since the 1994 school year. The first year of the program, a Marian team won the state championship.

== Notable people ==
- Kyle Bornheimer (Class of 1994): Actor
- Devin Cannady (Class of 2015): professional basketball player
- D. J. Fitzpatrick: Former professional football player
- Zander Horvath (Class of 2017): professional football player
- Jaden Ivey (Class of 2020; transferred before senior year): professional basketball player
- Demetrius Jackson (Class of 2013): professional basketball player
- Bob Otolski: Former Marian High School Athletics Director and head football coach for the Illinois State Redbirds football team

== See also ==
- List of high schools in Indiana
