= Walkerton, Indiana =

- Town
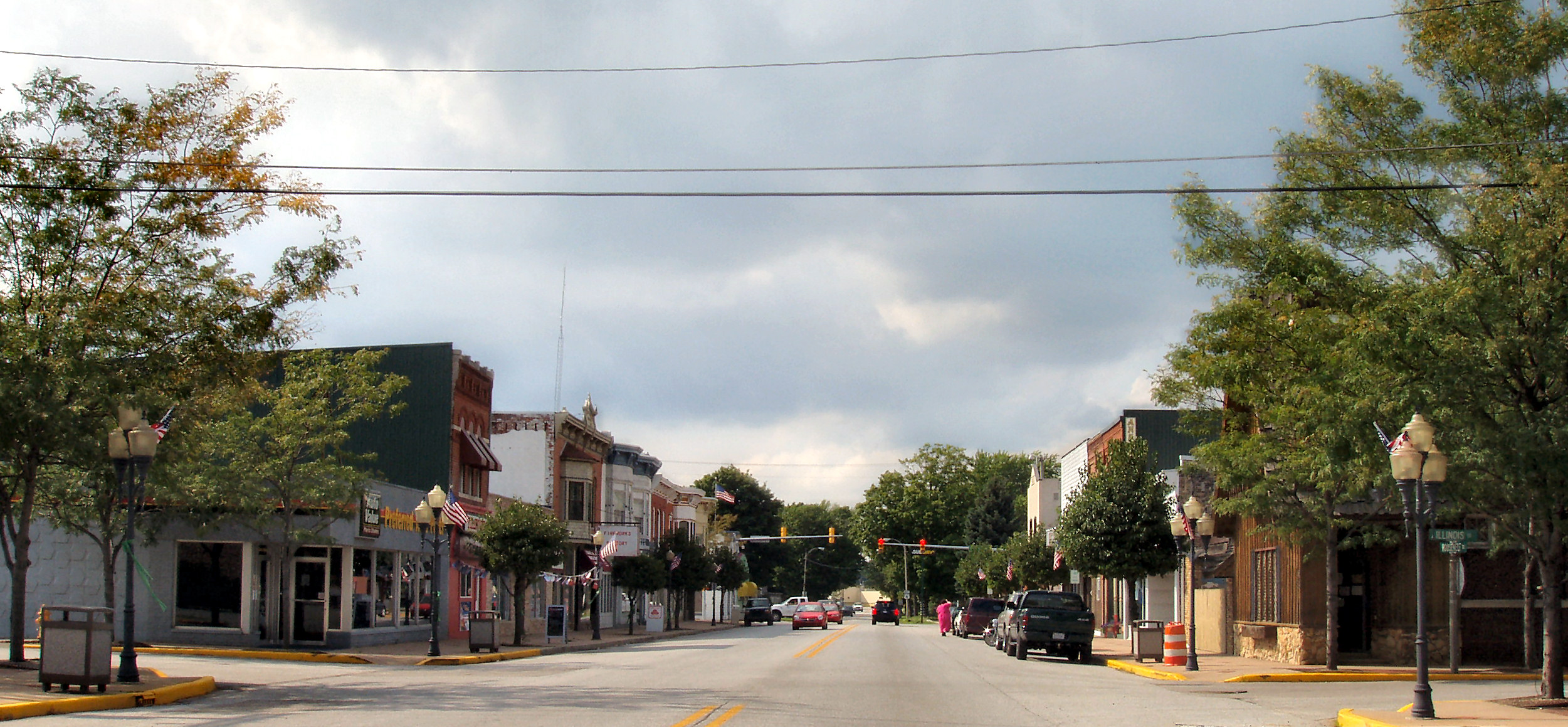
- Downtown Walkerton

- Logo

- Location of Walkerton in St. Joseph County, Indiana.
- Coordinates: 41°27′57″N 86°28′57″W
- Country: United States
- State: Indiana
- County: St. Joseph
- Township: Lincoln

Area
  - Total: 1.90 sq mi (4.93 km^{2})
  - Land: 1.90 sq mi (4.93 km^{2})
  - Water: 0 sq mi (0.00 km^{2})
- Elevation: 725 ft (221 m)

Population (2020)
  - Total: 2,096
  - Density: 1,100.9/sq mi (425.05/km^{2})
- Time zone: UTC-5 (Eastern (EST))
  - Summer (DST): UTC-4 (EDT)
- ZIP code: 46574
- Area code: 574
- FIPS code: 18-79694
- GNIS feature ID: 2397718
- Website: www.walkerton.gov

Walkerton is a town in Lincoln Township, St. Joseph County, in the U.S. state of Indiana. As of the 2020 census, Walkerton had a population of 2,096. It is part of the South Bend–Mishawaka, IN-MI, Metropolitan Statistical Area.

== History ==
Walkerton was platted in 1856. It was named for John Walker, a railroad promoter. The town was laid out by the railroad surveyors and the first lot was taken by C.W.N. Stephens, Walkerton's first postmaster. Stephens relocated his general store from nearby West York. The Walkerton post office has been in operation since 1860.

During World War II Walkerton housed some of the workers for the nearby Kingsbury Ordnance Plant. The plant initially sought 10,000 workers, and the entire population of LaPorte numbered only 16,000 in 1940. In August 1941 Kingsbury's first shells were loaded and en route to the front lines.

In July 2006, Walkerton celebrated its sesquicentennial (150-year anniversary).

In April 2015, Walkerton gained national attention after the owners of the town's local pizza parlor, Memories Pizza, became the first known Indiana business to advertise that it would not cater to a gay wedding after the passing of Indiana's Religious Freedom Restoration Act.

== Geography ==
According to the 2010 census, Walkerton has a total area of 1.96 square miles (5.08 km^{2}), all land.

== Demographics ==
Historical population
Census	Pop.	Note	%±
1880	754		—
1890	885		17.4%
1900	1,037		17.2%
1910	1,003		−3.3%
1920	1,031		2.8%
1930	1,137		10.3%
1940	1,178		3.6%
1950	2,102		78.4%
1960	2,044		−2.8%
1970	2,006		−1.9%
1980	2,051		2.2%
1990	2,061		0.5%
2000	2,274		10.3%
2010	2,144		−5.7%
2020	2,096		−2.2%
U.S. Decennial Census

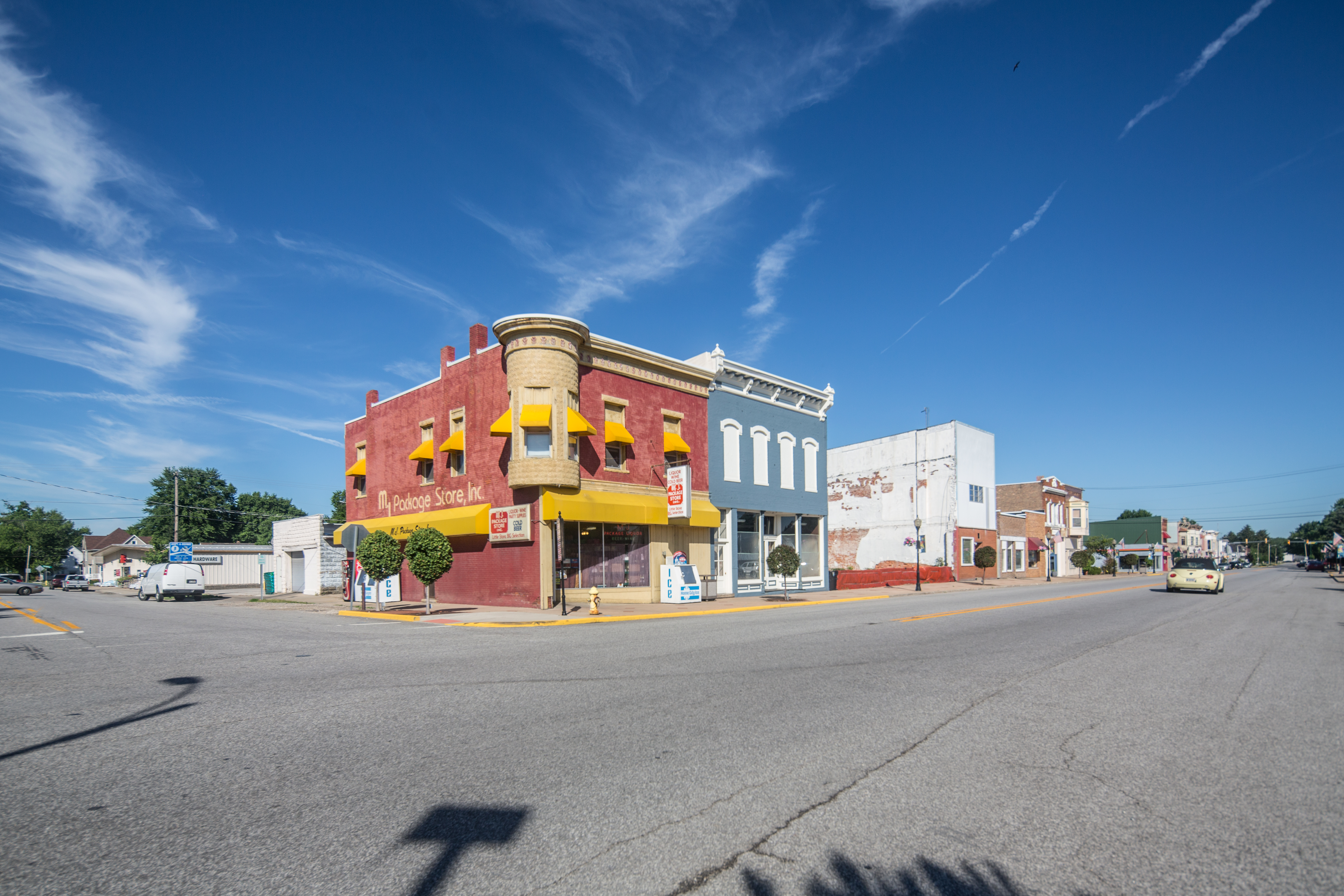
Downtown Walkerton

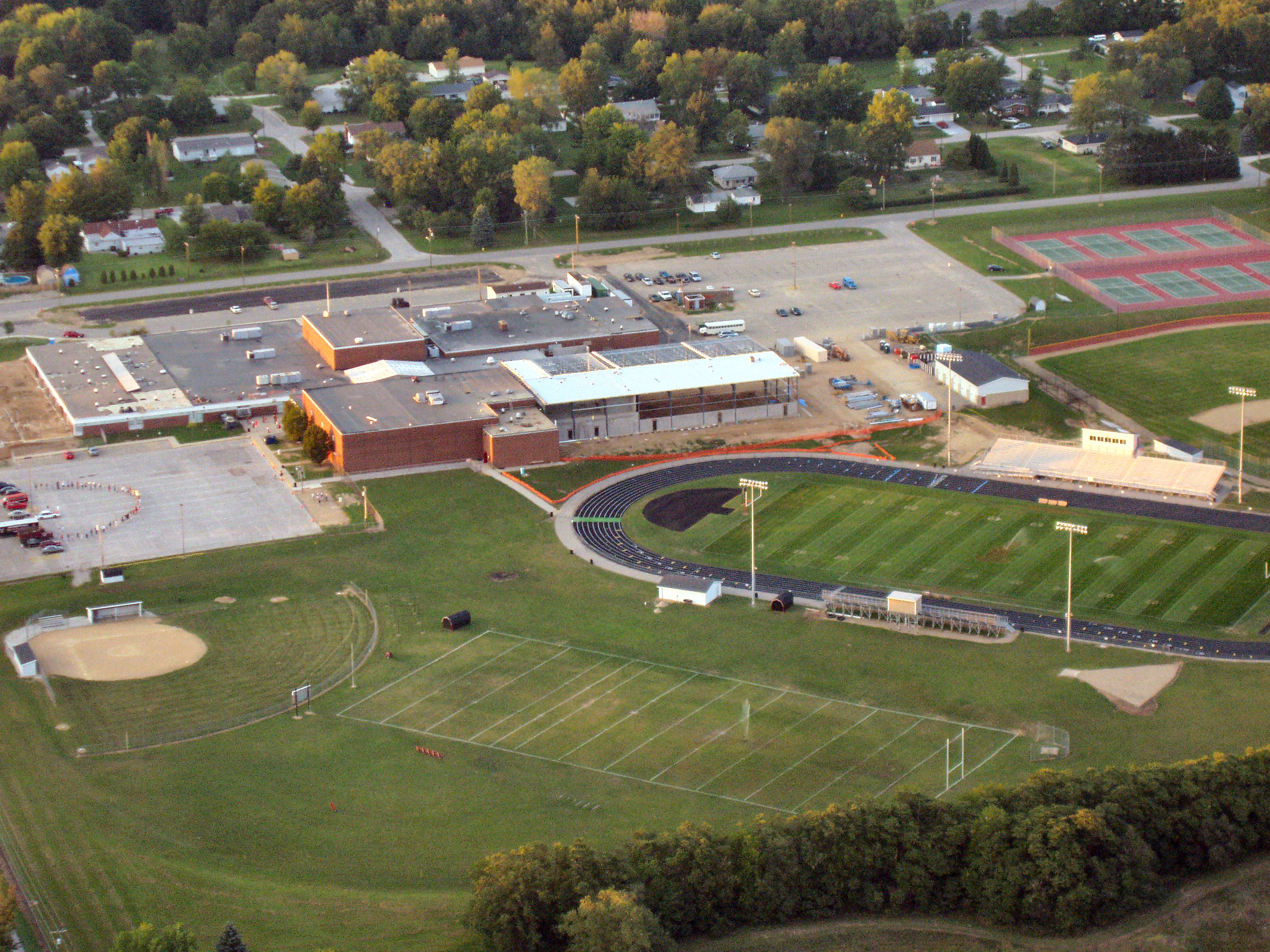
John Glenn High School, looking north

=== 2020 census ===
As of the 2020 census, Walkerton had a population of 2,096. The median age was 34.6 years. 30.2% of residents were under the age of 18 and 15.8% of residents were 65 years of age or older. For every 100 females there were 91.8 males, and for every 100 females age 18 and over there were 89.9 males age 18 and over.

0.0% of residents lived in urban areas, while 100.0% lived in rural areas.

There were 747 households in Walkerton, of which 36.7% had children under the age of 18 living in them. Of all households, 46.9% were married-couple households, 19.4% were households with a male householder and no spouse or partner present, and 26.6% were households with a female householder and no spouse or partner present. About 28.0% of all households were made up of individuals and 13.2% had someone living alone who was 65 years of age or older.

There were 817 housing units, of which 8.6% were vacant. The homeowner vacancy rate was 1.7% and the rental vacancy rate was 7.0%.

Racial composition as of the 2020 census
Race	Number	Percent
White	1,899	90.6%
Black or African American	20	1.0%
American Indian and Alaska Native	8	0.4%
Asian	14	0.7%
Native Hawaiian and Other Pacific Islander	0	0.0%
Some other race	34	1.6%
Two or more races	121	5.8%
Hispanic or Latino (of any race)	91	4.3%

=== 2010 census ===
As of the census of 2010, there were 2,144 people, 763 households, and 546 families living in the town. The population density was 1,093.9 inhabitants per square mile (422.4/km^{2}). There were 850 housing units at an average density of 433.7 per square mile (167.5/km^{2}). The racial makeup of the town was 95.0% White, 0.4% African American, 0.7% Native American, 0.3% Asian, 2.1% from other races, and 1.5% from two or more races. Hispanic or Latino of any race were 5.0% of the population.

There were 763 households, of which 38.9% had children under the age of 18 living with them, 51.1% were married couples living together, 15.7% had a female householder with no husband present, 4.7% had a male householder with no wife present, and 28.4% were non-families. 24.2% of all households were made up of individuals, and 10.7% had someone living alone who was 65 years of age or older. The average household size was 2.70 and the average family size was 3.18.

The median age in the town was 37.2 years. 26.5% of residents were under the age of 18; 8.9% were between the ages of 18 and 24; 24.7% were from 25 to 44; 25.4% were from 45 to 64; and 14.4% were 65 years of age or older. The gender makeup of the town was 46.9% male and 53.1% female.

=== 2000 census ===
As of the census of 2000, there were 2,274 people, 810 households, and 562 families living in the town. The population density was 1,310.6 inhabitants per square mile (506.0/km^{2}). There were 860 housing units at an average density of 495.7 per square mile (191.4/km^{2}). The racial makeup of the town was 94.24% White, 0.48% African American, 0.44% Native American, 0.35% Asian, 3.65% from other races, and 0.84% from two or more races. Hispanic or Latino of any race were 5.85% of the population.

There were 810 households, out of which 37.0% had children under the age of 18 living with them, 49.4% were married couples living together, 14.7% had a female householder with no husband present, and 30.5% were non-families. 26.7% of all households were made up of individuals, and 12.5% had someone living alone who was 65 years of age or older. The average household size was 2.67 and the average family size was 3.23.

In the town, the population was spread out, with 29.2% under the age of 18, 9.1% from 18 to 24, 27.7% from 25 to 44, 18.0% from 45 to 64, and 15.9% who were 65 years of age or older. The median age was 34 years. For every 100 females, there were 90.6 males. For every 100 females age 18 and over, there were 86.0 males.

The median income for a household in the town was $36,481, and the median income for a family was $42,407. Males had a median income of $31,895 versus $24,583 for females. The per capita income for the town was $15,122. About 11.3% of families and 14.5% of the population were below the poverty line, including 19.9% of those under age 18 and 14.4% of those age 65 or over.

== Arts and culture ==
Libraries include Walkerton-Lincoln Township Public Library; Fish Lake Branch library, operated by the La Porte County Public Library; and Koontz Lake Branch library, operated by Starke County Public Library System.

== Education ==
John Glenn School Corporation operates Walkerton Elementary School, Urey Middle School, and John Glenn High School.

== Notable people ==
- Chad Blount, NASCAR Nationwide Series driver
- Walter LaFeber (b. 1933), historian of American foreign relations; born in Walkerton
- Harold C. Urey (1893–1981), recipient of 1934 Nobel Prize in Chemistry for discovery of deuterium; born in Walkerton
