= St. Joseph High School (South Bend, Indiana) =

Saint Joseph High School

Location
- 453 North Notre Dame Avenue; South Bend, St. Joseph County, Indiana 46617; United States; 41.681286°N 86.238206°W

Information
- Type: Private
- Religious affiliation: Roman Catholic
- Patron saint: Saint Joseph
- Established: 1953; 73 years ago
- CEEB code: 153265
- Principal: John Kennedy
- Chaplain: Rev. Augustine Onuoha; Rev. David Smith
- Teaching staff: 53.5 (on an FTE basis)
- Grades: 9–12
- Gender: Coeducational
- Enrollment: 849 (2023-24)
- Student to teacher ratio: 15.9
- Campus size: 16.24 acres (65,700 m^{2})
- Colors: Columbia Blue; White; Black
- Athletics conference: Northern Indiana Conference
- Nickname: Huskies
- Rival: Mishawaka Marian High School
- Accreditation: North Central Association of Colleges and Schools
- Newspaper: Soundings
- Yearbook: Hi-Way
- Tuition: 2019–20 $8,065: Parishioner $9,636: Non-Parishioner
- Website: www.saintjoehigh.com

Saint Joseph High School (commonly referred to as St. Joe) is a Catholic college preparatory high school located in South Bend, Indiana. Formerly located adjacent to the campuses of the University of Notre Dame, St. Mary's College, and Holy Cross College, in 2012, the school moved to a new location about a mile south of Notre Dame. It is located within the Diocese of Fort Wayne–South Bend.

== History ==
Saint Joseph's High School began classes on September 20, 1953, as the first consolidated, co-institutional Catholic high school in the South Bend area. The school was made up of students from Central Catholic High School, Saint Hedwig School, Saint Joseph's Academy, and South Bend Catholic High School.

Contributions from South Bend and Mishawaka parishioners enabled building the school on 5.7 acres (23,000 m^{2}) of land donated to the Diocese of Fort Wayne-South Bend by the Brothers of Holy Cross.

From 1953 to 1968, Saint Joseph's High School had separate divisions for boys and girls. The faculty consisted primarily of Sisters of the Holy Cross and Brothers of Holy Cross. In 1968 the school became coeducational.

In 2012, St. Joseph's constructed a new building on the site formerly occupied by Saint Joseph Regional Medical Center. Along with the new building, the official name of the school was changed from Saint Joseph's High School to Saint Joseph High School.

== Academics ==
SJHS is accredited by the Indiana Department of Education and the North Central Association of Colleges and Schools and is also a member of the National Catholic Education Association.

19 different AP classes are offered. St Joe has been named a Blue Ribbon school by the United States Department of Education.

AP classes offered include AP Biology, AP Calculus AB, AP Calculus BC, AP Chemistry, AP Computer Science A, AP Computer Science Principles, AP English Language and Composition, AP English Literature and Composition, AP Environmental Science, AP Latin, AP Macroeconomics, AP Microeconomics, AP Physics C, AP Seminar, AP Spanish, AP Statistics, AP United States Government and Politics, AP United States History, AP World History.

SJHS was named one of the Top 50 Catholic High Schools in the Catholic High School Honor Roll every year from 2006 to 2013.

=== Academic teams ===
- Euro Challenge
- Fed Challenge
  - National Champions in 2010
- Quiz Bowl
  - Traditional State Champions in 2013, Rotary State Champions in 2013, 2014, 2015

== Athletics ==
The Saint Joseph Indians are a member of the Northern Indiana Conference. Fellow member Mishawaka Marian is Saint Joe's archrival; the SJHS Huskies, formerly Indians, and the Marian Knights battle annually for the Bishop's Trophy. This matchup is known as the "Holy War". Sports offered are:

- Baseball
  - State Champions in 2017
- Basketball (Boys)
  - State Champions in 2025
- Basketball (Girls)
  - State Champions in 2005, 2017
- Cheerleading
- Cross Country (Boys)
- Cross Country (Girls)
- Danceline
- Football
  - State Champions in 1995
  - Top-ranked in the state in 1964, prior to an official state championship.
- Golf (Boys)
- Golf (Girls)
- Hockey
  - State Champions in 1988, 1989
- Lacrosse (Boys)
  - State Champions in 2022
- Lacrosse (Girls)
  - State Champions 2025
- Soccer (Boys)
  - State Champions in 2003
- Soccer (Girls)
  - State Champions in 1998, 2010
- Softball
  - State Champions in 2022
- Swimming (Boys)
- Swimming (Girls)
- Tennis (Boys)
- Tennis (Girls)
  - Team State Champions in 1975 (3-way tie), 2010, 2024
- Track (Boys)
- Track (Girls)
- Volleyball
  - State Champions in 1972
- Wrestling

== Notable alumni ==
- Tom Abernethy, National Basketball Association (NBA) basketball player
- Paul Appleby, singer
- B. Patrick Bauer, former Speaker of the Indiana House of Representatives
- Brendan Bayliss, singer/guitarist of the band Umphrey's McGee
- John Broden, member of the Indiana Senate
- Pete Buttigieg, United States Secretary of Transportation, former mayor of South Bend, Indiana, 2020 presidential candidate
- Nathan Gunn, Award-winning baritone opera singer
- Traci Paige Johnson, animator and television producer, creator of Blue's Clues
- Joe Kernan, former governor of Indiana, former mayor of South Bend, Indiana
- Lary Kuharich, American football coach
- James Mueller, mayor of South Bend, Indiana
- John Laskowski, Indiana University basketball broadcaster, former NBA Player and member of IU's national championship team
- Mike McNeill, former NHL hockey player
- Steve Ontiveros, former MLB pitcher; 1994 All Star with Oakland Athletics; American League ERA Leader 1994
- Clarissa Pinkola Estés, poet, post-trauma specialist, and Jungian psychoanalyst
- Mike Schmuhl, political campaign manager
- Jim Sniadecki, former professional football player
- Jake Teshka, politician
- Patrick J. Urda, Chief Judge of the United States Tax Court

== See also ==
- List of high schools in Indiana
