= South Bend–Mishawaka metropolitan area =

South Bend-Mishawaka Metropolitan Area South Bend–Mishawaka Metropolitan Statistical Area
- Combined Statistical Area
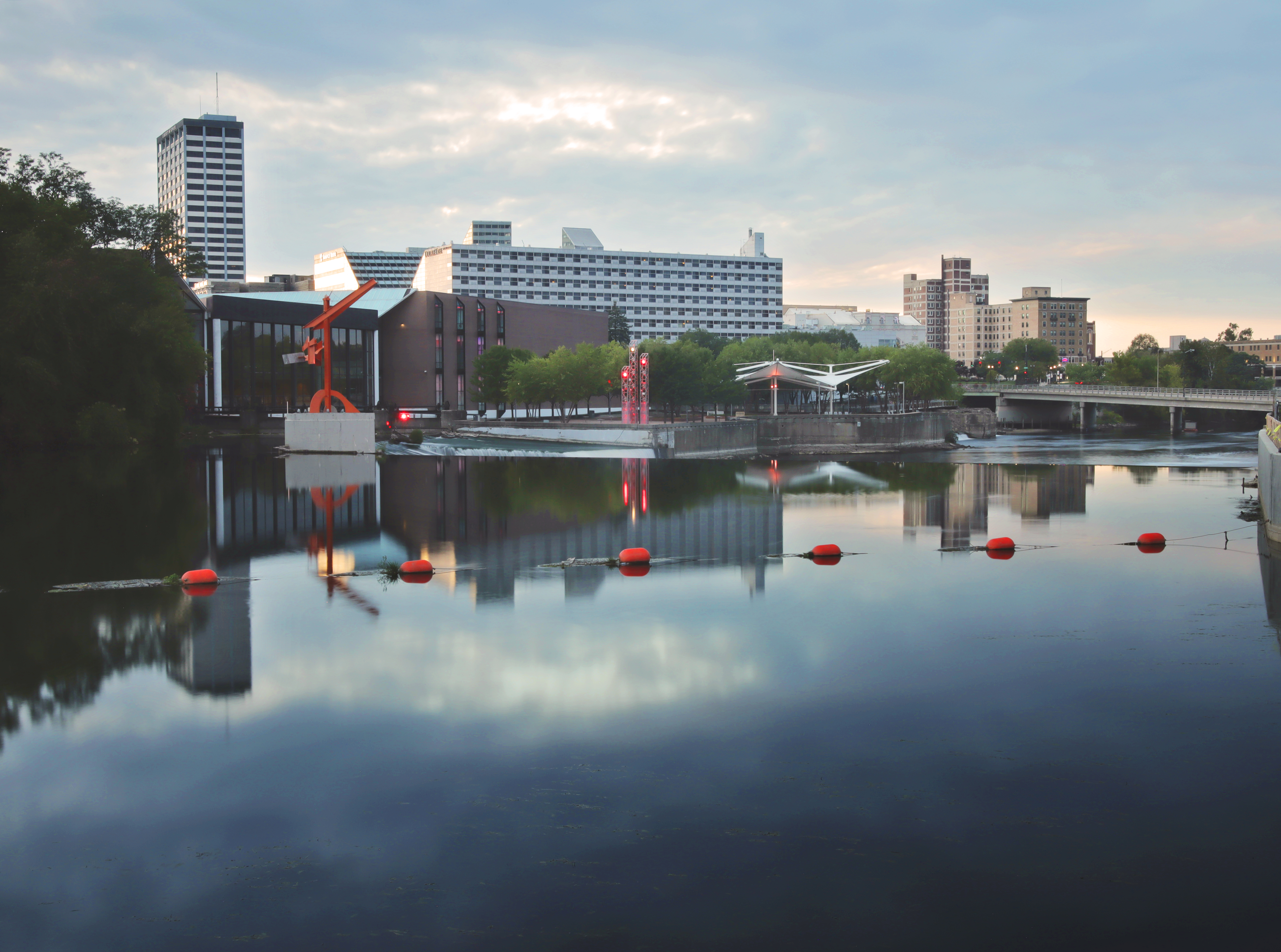
- Downtown South Bend and St. Joseph River
South Bend–Mishawaka, IN–MI CSA
South Bend–Mishawaka, IN–MI MSA
Elkhart–Goshen, IN MSA
Niles, MI MSA
Warsaw, IN µSA
Plymouth, IN µSA
City of South Bend
City of Mishawaka
- Country: United States
- State: Indiana; Michigan

Area
  - Total: 971 sq mi (2,515 km^{2})

Population (2010)
  - Total: 319,224

GDP
  - Total: $19.042 billion (2022)
- Time zone: UTC−5 (EST)
  - Summer (DST): UTC−4 (EDT)

The South Bend–Mishawaka, IN–MI Metropolitan Statistical Area, as defined by the U.S. Office of Management and Budget, is a metropolitan area consisting of two counties – one in northern Indiana (St. Joseph) and one in southwest Michigan (Cass), anchored by the cities of South Bend and Mishawaka in Indiana. As of the 2020 census, the metropolitan statistical area (MSA) had a population of 324,501 (though a July 1, 2025 estimate placed the population at 324,538). The MSA is the 164th largest in the United States. It is contained within the Michiana region.

The MSA is a component of the broader South Bend–Elkhart–Mishawaka, IN–MI Combined Statistical Area, which also includes the Elkhart–Goshen, IN and Niles, MI metropolitan areas, as well as the Plymouth, IN and Warsaw, IN micropolitan areas. The CSA had a total population of 812,199 at the 2020 census, increasing to an estimated 813,247 in 2025. The CSA is the 69th largest in the United States.

== Counties ==
- St. Joseph County, Indiana
- Cass County, Michigan

== Communities ==
=== Places with more than 100,000 inhabitants ===
- South Bend, Indiana (Principal city)

=== Places with 50,000 to 100,000 inhabitants ===
- Mishawaka, Indiana (Principal city)

=== Places with 1,000 to 50,000 inhabitants ===
- Cassopolis, Michigan
- Dowagiac, Michigan
- Edwardsburg, Michigan
- Marcellus, Michigan
- New Carlisle, Indiana
- Niles, Michigan (partial)
- North Liberty, Indiana
- Osceola, Indiana
- Walkerton, Indiana

=== Places with less than 1,000 inhabitants ===
- Indian Village, Indiana
- Lakeville, Indiana
- Roseland, Indiana
- Vandalia, Michigan

=== Unincorporated places ===
- Colburn, Indiana
- Crumstown, Indiana
- Georgetown, Indiana (census-designated place)
- Granger, Indiana (census-designated place)
- Gulivoire Park, Indiana (census-designated place)
- La Grange, Michigan
- Notre Dame, Indiana
- Penn, Michigan
- Pleasant Valley, Indiana
- Pokagon, Michigan
- Sumnerville, Michigan
- Union, Michigan
- Wyatt, Indiana

== Townships ==
=== St. Joseph County ===
- Clay Township
- German Township
- Greene Township
- Harris Township
- Liberty Township
- Lincoln Township
- Madison Township
- Olive Township
- Penn Township
- Portage Township
- Union Township
- Warren Township

=== Cass County ===
- Calvin Township
- Howard Township
- Jefferson Township
- LaGrange Township
- Marcellus Township
- Mason Township
- Milton Township
- Newberg Township
- Ontwa Township
- Penn Township
- Pokagon Township
- Porter Township
- Silver Creek Township
- Volinia Township
- Wayne Township

== Demographics ==
Historical population
Census	Pop.	Note	%±
1970	288,357		—
1980	291,116		1.0%
1990	296,529		1.9%
2000	316,663		6.8%
2010	319,224		0.8%
2020	324,501		1.7%
U.S. Decennial Census

As of the census of 2000, there were 316,663 people, 120,419 households, and 81,096 families residing within the MSA. The racial makeup of the MSA was 83.46% White, 10.59% African American, 0.43% Native American, 1.21% Asian, 0.04% Pacific Islander, 2.27% from other races, and 2.00% from two or more races. Hispanic or Latino of any race were 4.35% of the population.

The median income for a household in the MSA was $40,842, and the median income for a family was $48,277. Males had a median income of $36,311 versus $24,918 for females. The per capita income for the MSA was $19,615.

County	State	Seat	2025 estimate	2020 census	Change	Land area	Density
St. Joseph	Indiana	South Bend	272,861	272,912	−0.02%	456 sq mi (1,180 km^{2})	598/sq mi (231/km^{2})
Cass	Michigan	Cassopolis	51,677	51,589	+0.17%	490 sq mi (1,300 km^{2})	105/sq mi (41/km^{2})
Total			324,538	324,501	+0.01%	946 sq mi (2,450 km^{2})	343/sq mi (132/km^{2})

== Combined Statistical Area ==
The South Bend–Elkhart–Mishawaka, IN–MI Combined Statistical Area is made up of six counties – four in northern Indiana and two in southwest Michigan. The statistical area includes three metropolitan areas and two micropolitan areas. As of the 2020 Census, the CSA had a population of 812,199.

- Metropolitan Statistical Areas (MSAs)
  - South Bend–Mishawaka (St. Joseph County, Indiana and Cass County, Michigan)
  - Elkhart–Goshen (Elkhart County, Indiana)
  - Niles (Berrien County, Michigan)
- Micropolitan Statistical Areas (μSAs)
  - Plymouth (Marshall County, Indiana)
  - Warsaw (Kosciusko County, Indiana)

Statistical Area	2025 estimate	2020 Census	Change	Land area	Density
South Bend–Mishawaka, IN–MI Metropolitan Statistical Area	324,538	324,501	+0.01%	946 sq mi (2,450 km^{2})	343/sq mi (132/km^{2})
Elkhart–Goshen, IN Metropolitan Statistical Area	208,774	207,047	+0.83%	463 sq mi (1,200 km^{2})	451/sq mi (174/km^{2})
Niles, MI Metropolitan Statistical Area	152,444	154,316	−1.21%	568 sq mi (1,470 km^{2})	268/sq mi (104/km^{2})
Warsaw, IN Micropolitan Statistical Area	80,892	80,240	+0.81%	531 sq mi (1,380 km^{2})	152/sq mi (59/km^{2})
Plymouth, IN Micropolitan Statistical Area	46,599	46,095	+1.09%	444 sq mi (1,150 km^{2})	105/sq mi (41/km^{2})
Total	813,247	812,199	+0.13%	2,952 sq mi (7,650 km^{2})	275/sq mi (106/km^{2})

== Transportation ==
The South Bend-Mishawaka Metropolitan Area is served by two main transit corporations; South Bend Transpo and the Interurban Trolley. TRANSPO services downtown South Bend, the local South Bend station, South Bend International Airport, and the South Shore Line station. The trolley makes connection with TRANSPO in downtown Mishawaka while providing transportation to residents of Elkhart, Indiana and Goshen, Indiana as well.

== See also ==
- Michiana
- Indiana census statistical areas
