= Maple Lane, Indiana =

- Unincorporated community
- Location within Indiana Location within the United States
- Coordinates: 41°42′00″N 86°13′01″W
- Country: United States
- State: Indiana
- County: St. Joseph
- Township: Clay
- Elevation: 748 ft (228 m)
- Time zone: UTC-5 (Eastern (EST))
  - Summer (DST): UTC-4 (EDT)
- ZIP code: 46637
- Area code: 574
- GNIS feature ID: 452680

Maple Lane is an unincorporated community in Clay Township, St. Joseph County, Indiana, United States.

The community is part of the South Bend–Mishawaka IN-MI, Metropolitan Statistical Area.

== History ==
In 1922 the National Realty and Development Co. of Louisville, Kentucky launched the sale of one to five acre lots in Maple Lane with a giveaway of $500 in gold, a free homesite, a band and a free lunch. By 1928, the population was estimated to be 200. In 1971, the population was estimated to be 3,238.

In 1937, Maple Lane became the site of Ponader Park, the first public park in St. Joseph's county, with a donation of land from William J Ponader, owner of Maple Lane Realty. In 1961 the park was donated to the South Bend Board of Park Commissioners.

n 1939, the Maple Lane and Wilmette Civic Association fought off an attempt at annexation. In 1945, action by the Maple Lane Civic Association resulted in increased transportation services.

By 1957, the 950-acre area had around 1,800 homes and a population of at least 5,500. In September 1957, the Maple Lane Business Men's Association, a group of 22 Maple Lane businesses, organized a meeting to discuss issues with wells, septic tanks, and to discuss annexation by South Bend. In 1971, South Bend voted to annex Maple Lane. Over 1000 residents attended the South Common Council public hearing to object to the annexation. Proponents of the annexation went so far as to suggest that if the annexation did not go through, they would consider abandoning its city government and turning all municipal functions to the county government. The annexation was tied up in the courts for several years. In 1977, the annexation was rescinded.
