= Lakeville High School =

Lakeville High School may refer to:

- Lakeville North High School, in northern Lakeville, Minnesota
- Lakeville South High School, in southern Lakeville, Minnesota
- Lakeville High School (Lakeville, Indiana), listed on the NRHP in St. Joseph County, Indiana
