= State Line, St. Joseph County, Indiana =

State Line
- Unincorporated community
- Location within Indiana Location within the United States
- Coordinates: 41°45′30″N 86°15′15″W
- Country: United States
- State: Indiana
- County: St. Joseph
- Township: Clay
- Elevation: 719 ft (219 m)
- Time zone: UTC-5 (Eastern (EST))
  - Summer (DST): UTC-4 (EDT)
- ZIP code: 46637
- Area code: 574
- GNIS feature ID: 452857

State Line is an unincorporated community in Clay Township, St. Joseph County, in the U.S. state of Indiana.

The community is close to the state border between Indiana and Michigan, and is part of the South Bend–Mishawaka IN-MI, Metropolitan Statistical Area.
