= Ardmore, Indiana =

- Unincorporated community and Census designated place
- Location within Indiana Location within the United States
- Coordinates: 41°41′32″N 86°19′27″W
- Country: United States
- State: Indiana
- County: St. Joseph
- Township: Portage
- Elevation: 748 ft (228 m)
- Time zone: UTC-5 (Eastern (EST))
  - Summer (DST): UTC-4 (EDT)
- ZIP code: 46628
- Area code: 574
- GNIS feature ID: 2830520

Ardmore is an unincorporated suburb of South Bend in Portage Township, St. Joseph County, in the U.S. state of Indiana.

== History ==
The community's name may be a transfer from Ardmore, Pennsylvania.

== Demographics ==
The United States Census Bureau delineated Ardmore as a census designated place in the 2022 American Community Survey.
