= Clay Township, St. Joseph County, Indiana =

Clay Township
- Township
- Seal

- Location in St. Joseph County
- Coordinates: 41°44′N 86°13′W
- Country: United States
- State: Indiana
- County: St. Joseph

Government
  - Type: Indiana township

Area
  - Total: 19.84 sq mi (51.38 km^{2})
  - Land: 19.70 sq mi (51.01 km^{2})
  - Water: 0.14 sq mi (0.37 km^{2}) 0.72%
- Elevation: 761 ft (232 m)

Population (2020)
  - Total: 34,235
  - Density: 1,988/sq mi (767.4/km^{2})
- Time zone: UTC-5 (Eastern (EST))
  - Summer (DST): UTC-4 (EDT)
- ZIP codes: 46530, 46545, 46556, 46617, 46635, 46637
- Area code: 574
- GNIS feature ID: 453218
- Website: claysb.com

Clay Township is one of 13 townships in St. Joseph County, in the U.S. state of Indiana. As of the 2020 census, its population was 34,235.

== Geography ==
According to the United States Census Bureau, Clay Township covers an area of 19.84 square miles (51.4 km^{2}); of this, 19.7 square miles (51 km^{2}) (99.28 percent) is land and 0.14 square miles (0.36 km^{2}) (0.72 percent) is water.

=== Cities, towns, villages ===
- Indian Village
- Mishawaka (partial)
- Roseland
- South Bend (partial)

=== Census Designated Places ===
- Georgetown
- Granger (west quarter)
- Notre Dame (Partial)

=== Unincorporated towns ===
- Maple Lane at 41.7000°N 86.2170°W
- State Line at 41.7584°N 86.2542°W

(This list is based on USGS data and may include former settlements.)

=== Adjacent townships ===
- Milton Township, Cass County, Michigan (northeast)
- Harris Township (east)
- Penn Township (southeast)
- Portage Township (southwest)
- Bertrand Township, Berrien County, Michigan (west)
- German Township (west)
- Niles Township, Berrien County, Michigan (northwest)

=== Cemeteries ===
The township contains Stuckey Cemetery.

=== Major highways ===
- Indiana Toll Road
- I-80
- I-90
- SR 23
- SR 933

=== Lakes ===
- Juday Lake
- Tawny Lake

=== Landmarks ===
- Saint Mary's College (north quarter)
- University of Notre Dame (partial)
- St. Patrick's Farm was listed on the National Register of Historic Places in 2013.

== School districts ==
- South Bend Community School Corporation

== Political districts ==
- Indiana's 2nd congressional district
- State House District 5
- State House District 6
- State House District 8
- State Senate District 10
- State Senate District 11
