= Lakeville, Indiana =

- Town
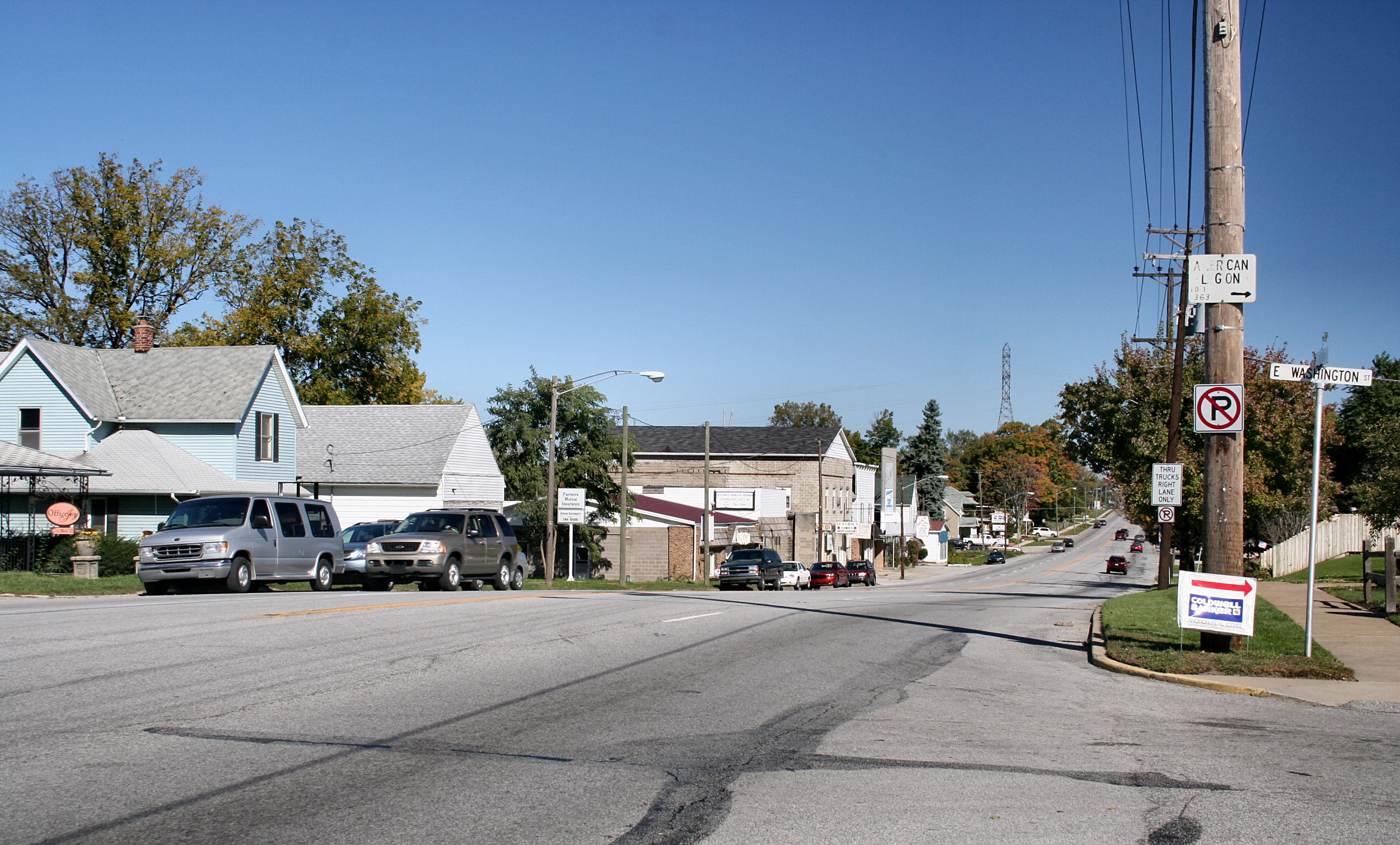
- Lakeville downtown

- Flag Logo

- Location of Lakeville in St. Joseph County, Indiana.
- Coordinates: 41°31′43″N 86°16′28″W
- Country: United States
- State: Indiana
- County: St. Joseph
- Township: Union

Area
  - Total: 0.63 sq mi (1.64 km^{2})
  - Land: 0.63 sq mi (1.63 km^{2})
  - Water: 0.0039 sq mi (0.01 km^{2})
- Elevation: 853 ft (260 m)

Population (2020)
  - Total: 879
  - Density: 1,393.5/sq mi (538.04/km^{2})
- Time zone: UTC-5 (Eastern (EST))
  - Summer (DST): UTC-4 (EDT)
- ZIP code: 46536
- Area code: 574
- FIPS code: 18-41670
- GNIS feature ID: 2396705
- Website: townoflakevilleindiana.com

Lakeville is a town 11 miles (18 km) south of South Bend in Union Township, St. Joseph County, in the U.S. state of Indiana. As of the 2020 census, Lakeville had a population of 879. It is part of the South Bend–Mishawaka metropolitan area.

== History ==
The area of Lakeville was first settled by Euro-Americans in 1836. The railroad in 1845 spurred further growth. By the 1890s there were 13 one-room school houses in the vicinity. In 1898 they were consolidated into one two-story elementary school in Lakeville. The town of Lakeville was incorporated in 1902.

The Lakeville post office has been in operation since 1850.

Lakeville High School was listed on the National Register of Historic Places in 1991.

Hoosier Racing Tire Corporation, owned since 2016 by parent company Continental AG has their Headquarters, Track Services, and Warehouse operations in Lakeville with Manufacturing located 20 miles south in Plymouth, Indiana.

Lakeville was the site of two different multiple murders. In 1989, four members of the family of Reverend Bob Pelley were shot dead in their Lakeville home. In 2000, three workmen were shot and killed in an upscale home in Lakeville. The 2000 case has been featured twice on television documentaries, once in an episode of Extreme Forensics on June 7, 2010, titled "Rooted in Murder", and once in an episode of Forensic Files II on March 13, 2022, titled "Dog Proof".

== Geography ==
According to the 2010 census, Lakeville has a total area of 0.61 square miles (1.58 km^{2}), all land.

=== Climate ===
Climate data for Lakeville, Indiana, 1991–2020 normals, extremes 1989–present
| Month | Jan | Feb | Mar | Apr | May | Jun | Jul | Aug | Sep | Oct | Nov | Dec | Year |
|---|---|---|---|---|---|---|---|---|---|---|---|---|---|
| Record high °F (°C) | 64 (18) | 72 (22) | 84 (29) | 86 (30) | 93 (34) | 97 (36) | 100 (38) | 96 (36) | 94 (34) | 87 (31) | 78 (26) | 69 (21) | 100 (38) |
| Mean maximum °F (°C) | 53.2 (11.8) | 55.7 (13.2) | 68.1 (20.1) | 78.5 (25.8) | 85.9 (29.9) | 90.9 (32.7) | 91.2 (32.9) | 90.1 (32.3) | 87.8 (31.0) | 80.4 (26.9) | 66.5 (19.2) | 55.7 (13.2) | 93.1 (33.9) |
| Mean daily maximum °F (°C) | 31.4 (−0.3) | 35.2 (1.8) | 46.2 (7.9) | 59.1 (15.1) | 70.3 (21.3) | 78.9 (26.1) | 82.1 (27.8) | 80.3 (26.8) | 74.6 (23.7) | 62.4 (16.9) | 48.0 (8.9) | 36.8 (2.7) | 58.8 (14.9) |
| Daily mean °F (°C) | 23.2 (−4.9) | 26.1 (−3.3) | 36.0 (2.2) | 47.6 (8.7) | 58.8 (14.9) | 68.1 (20.1) | 71.4 (21.9) | 69.4 (20.8) | 62.8 (17.1) | 51.3 (10.7) | 39.0 (3.9) | 29.0 (−1.7) | 48.6 (9.2) |
| Mean daily minimum °F (°C) | 14.9 (−9.5) | 16.9 (−8.4) | 25.8 (−3.4) | 36.1 (2.3) | 47.3 (8.5) | 57.3 (14.1) | 60.6 (15.9) | 58.4 (14.7) | 51.1 (10.6) | 40.3 (4.6) | 29.9 (−1.2) | 21.2 (−6.0) | 38.3 (3.5) |
| Mean minimum °F (°C) | −6.2 (−21.2) | −1.5 (−18.6) | 9.0 (−12.8) | 22.7 (−5.2) | 33.0 (0.6) | 43.3 (6.3) | 49.1 (9.5) | 48.3 (9.1) | 37.9 (3.3) | 27.5 (−2.5) | 16.9 (−8.4) | 3.3 (−15.9) | −10.2 (−23.4) |
| Record low °F (°C) | −22 (−30) | −20 (−29) | −6 (−21) | 15 (−9) | 25 (−4) | 35 (2) | 41 (5) | 40 (4) | 30 (−1) | 23 (−5) | 4 (−16) | −19 (−28) | −22 (−30) |
| Average precipitation inches (mm) | 2.65 (67) | 2.49 (63) | 2.52 (64) | 3.71 (94) | 4.45 (113) | 4.40 (112) | 4.72 (120) | 4.35 (110) | 3.51 (89) | 3.53 (90) | 2.99 (76) | 2.54 (65) | 41.86 (1,063) |
| Average snowfall inches (cm) | 13.1 (33) | 10.7 (27) | 3.6 (9.1) | 0.6 (1.5) | 0.0 (0.0) | 0.0 (0.0) | 0.0 (0.0) | 0.0 (0.0) | 0.0 (0.0) | 0.1 (0.25) | 2.7 (6.9) | 5.8 (15) | 36.6 (92.75) |
| Average precipitation days (≥ 0.01 in) | 13.7 | 11.0 | 11.6 | 12.8 | 13.6 | 11.8 | 10.1 | 9.9 | 9.5 | 10.9 | 12.4 | 13.0 | 140.3 |
| Average snowy days (≥ 0.1 in) | 8.0 | 6.0 | 2.8 | 0.4 | 0.0 | 0.0 | 0.0 | 0.0 | 0.0 | 0.1 | 1.5 | 5.2 | 24.0 |
Source 1: NOAA
Source 2: National Weather Service

== Demographics ==
Historical population
| Census | Pop. | Note | %± |
|---|---|---|---|
| 1910 | 227 | | — |
| 1920 | 333 | | 46.7% |
| 1930 | 522 | | 56.8% |
| 1940 | 567 | | 8.6% |
| 1950 | 736 | | 29.8% |
| 1960 | 757 | | 2.9% |
| 1970 | 712 | | −5.9% |
| 1980 | 629 | | −11.7% |
| 1990 | 655 | | 4.1% |
| 2000 | 567 | | −13.4% |
| 2010 | 786 | | 38.6% |
| 2020 | 879 | | 11.8% |
U.S. Decennial Census

=== 2010 census ===
As of the census of 2010, there were 786 people, 367 households, and 193 families living in the town. The population density was 1,288.5 inhabitants per square mile (497.5/km^{2}). There were 438 housing units at an average density of 718.0 per square mile (277.2/km^{2}). The racial makeup of the town was 97.5% White, 0.1% African American, 0.4% Native American, 0.5% from other races, and 1.5% from two or more races. Hispanic or Latino of any race were 3.2% of the population.

There were 367 households, of which 31.3% had children under the age of 18 living with them, 33.2% were married couples living together, 15.3% had a female householder with no husband present, 4.1% had a male householder with no wife present, and 47.4% were non-families. 42.0% of all households were made up of individuals, and 14.7% had someone living alone who was 65 years of age or older. The average household size was 2.14 and the average family size was 2.94.

The median age in the town was 36.5 years. 24.7% of residents were under the age of 18; 8% were between the ages of 18 and 24; 26.7% were from 25 to 44; 26.7% were from 45 to 64; and 13.9% were 65 years of age or older. The gender makeup of the town was 49.0% male and 51.0% female.

=== 2000 census ===
As of the census of 2000, there were 567 people, 274 households, and 143 families living in the town. The population density was 1,082.5 inhabitants per square mile (418.0/km^{2}). There were 300 housing units at an average density of 572.8 per square mile (221.2/km^{2}). The racial makeup of the town was 97.71% White, 0.35% African American, 0.18% Pacific Islander, 0.18% from other races, and 1.59% from two or more races. Hispanic or Latino of any race were 1.59% of the population.

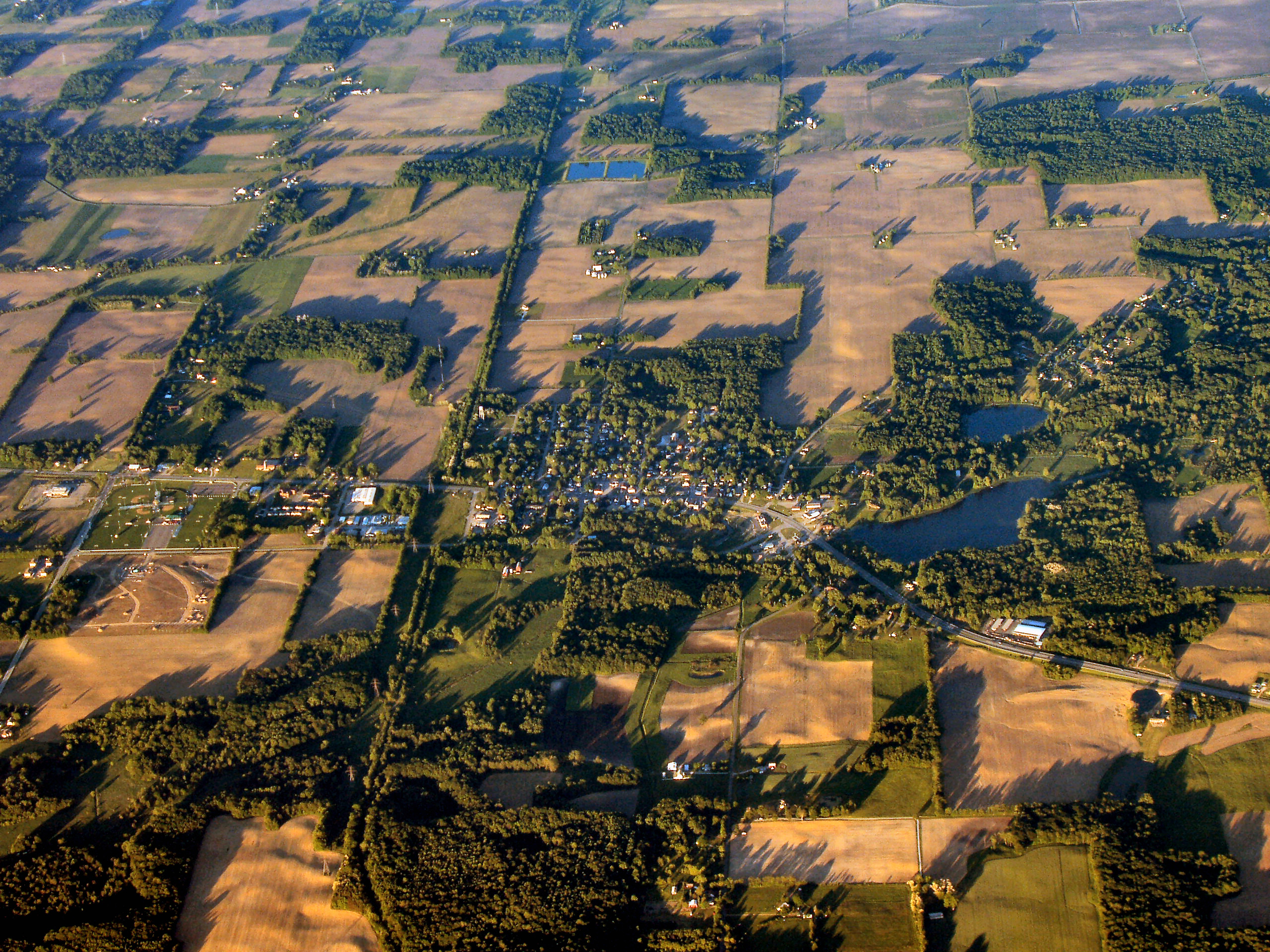
Lakeville from the west

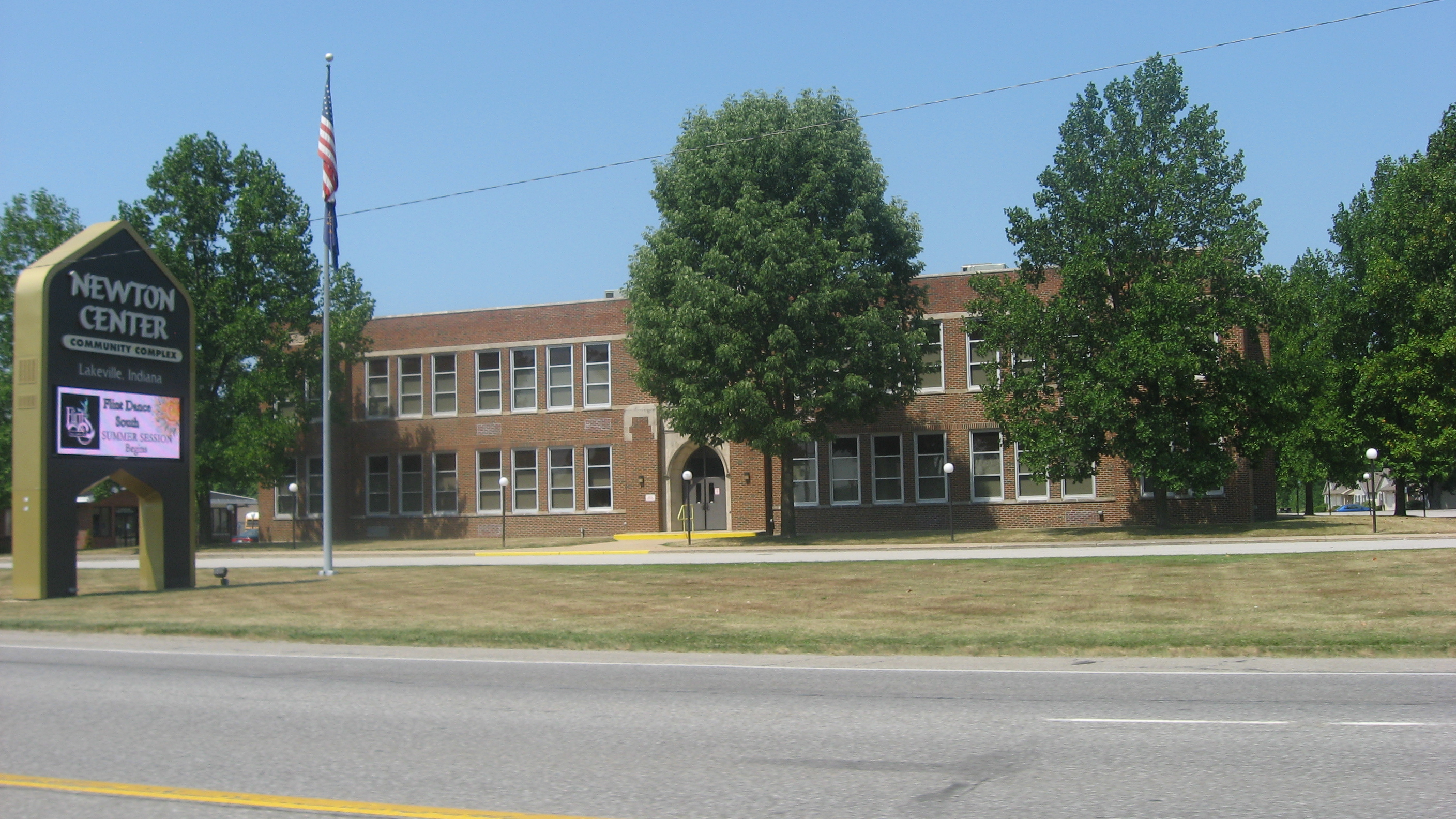
The former Lakeville High School is listed on the National Register of Historic Places

There were 274 households, out of which 21.2% had children under the age of 18 living with them, 35.0% were married couples living together, 13.9% had a female householder with no husband present, and 47.8% were non-families. 43.1% of all households were made up of individuals, and 12.8% had someone living alone who was 65 years of age or older. The average household size was 2.07 and the average family size was 2.90.

In the town, the population was spread out, with 22.2% under the age of 18, 11.6% from 18 to 24, 28.7% from 25 to 44, 18.7% from 45 to 64, and 18.7% who were 65 years of age or older. The median age was 37 years. For every 100 females, there were 85.9 males. For every 100 females age 18 and over, there were 86.9 males.

The median income for a household in the town was $28,438, and the median income for a family was $43,309. Males had a median income of $31,033 versus $23,036 for females. The per capita income for the town was $15,885. About 13.5% of families and 13.6% of the population were below the poverty line, including 27.2% of those under age 18 and none of those age 65 or over.

== Education ==
Public schools in Lakeville are operated by Union-North United Schools.

Lakeville has a public library, a branch of the St Joseph County Public Library.
