= LaSalle Trail =

Trail in Indiana, US

Coordinates: 41°43′5.7″N 86°15′9.7″W

Built in 2001, the LaSalle Trail is a 12.61 acre rail trail in Indiana. The 3.5-mile (5.6 km) bicycle and walking trail stretches from Roseland, Indiana to the Indiana-Michigan border. The rail corridor was once an interurban line between Niles, Michigan and South Bend, Indiana and was operated by Indiana Railway Co. and the Southern Michigan Railway Co. The trail is part of a larger network known as the Indiana-Michigan River Valley Trail. It also designated as a Visionary Trail, a trail that serves as a connection point between multiple other trails by the Indiana Department of Natural Resources.

== See also ==
- List of rail trails
