= Union Township, St. Joseph County, Indiana =

Union Township
- Township
- Location in St. Joseph County
- Coordinates: 41°31′08″N 86°15′40″W
- Country: United States
- State: Indiana
- County: St. Joseph

Government
  - Type: Indiana township

Area
  - Total: 43.10 sq mi (111.62 km^{2})
  - Land: 42.89 sq mi (111.08 km^{2})
  - Water: 0.21 sq mi (0.54 km^{2}) 0.48%
- Elevation: 846 ft (258 m)

Population (2020)
  - Total: 3,478
  - Density: 81.09/sq mi (31.31/km^{2})
- Time zone: UTC-5 (Eastern (EST))
  - Summer (DST): UTC-4 (EDT)
- ZIP codes: 46506, 46536, 46554, 46614
- Area code: 574
- GNIS feature ID: 453933
- Website: Official website

Union Township is one of thirteen townships in St. Joseph County, in the U.S. state of Indiana. As of the 2020 census, its population was 3,478.

== Geography ==
According to the United States Census Bureau, Union Township covers an area of 43.1 square miles (112 km^{2}); of this, 42.89 square miles (111.1 km^{2}) (99.52 percent) is land and 0.21 square miles (0.54 km^{2}) (0.48 percent) is water.

=== Cities, towns, villages ===
- Lakeville

=== Unincorporated towns ===
- Colburn at 41.548937°N 86.26834°W
- Midway Corners at 41.520881°N 86.202227°W

(This list is based on USGS data and may include former settlements.)

=== Adjacent townships ===
- Centre Township (north)
- Madison Township (east)
- German Township, Marshall County (southeast)
- North Township, Marshall County (south)
- Liberty Township (west)
- Greene Township (northwest)

=== Cemeteries ===
The township contains Lakeville Cemetery.

=== Major highways ===
- US 31
- SR 4

=== Lakes ===
- Fites Lake
- Pleasant Lake
- Riddles Lake

== School districts ==
- LaVille Community Schools

== Political districts ==
- Indiana's 2nd congressional district
- State House District 21
- State Senate District 9
