= St. Patrick's Farm =

- U.S. National Register of Historic Places
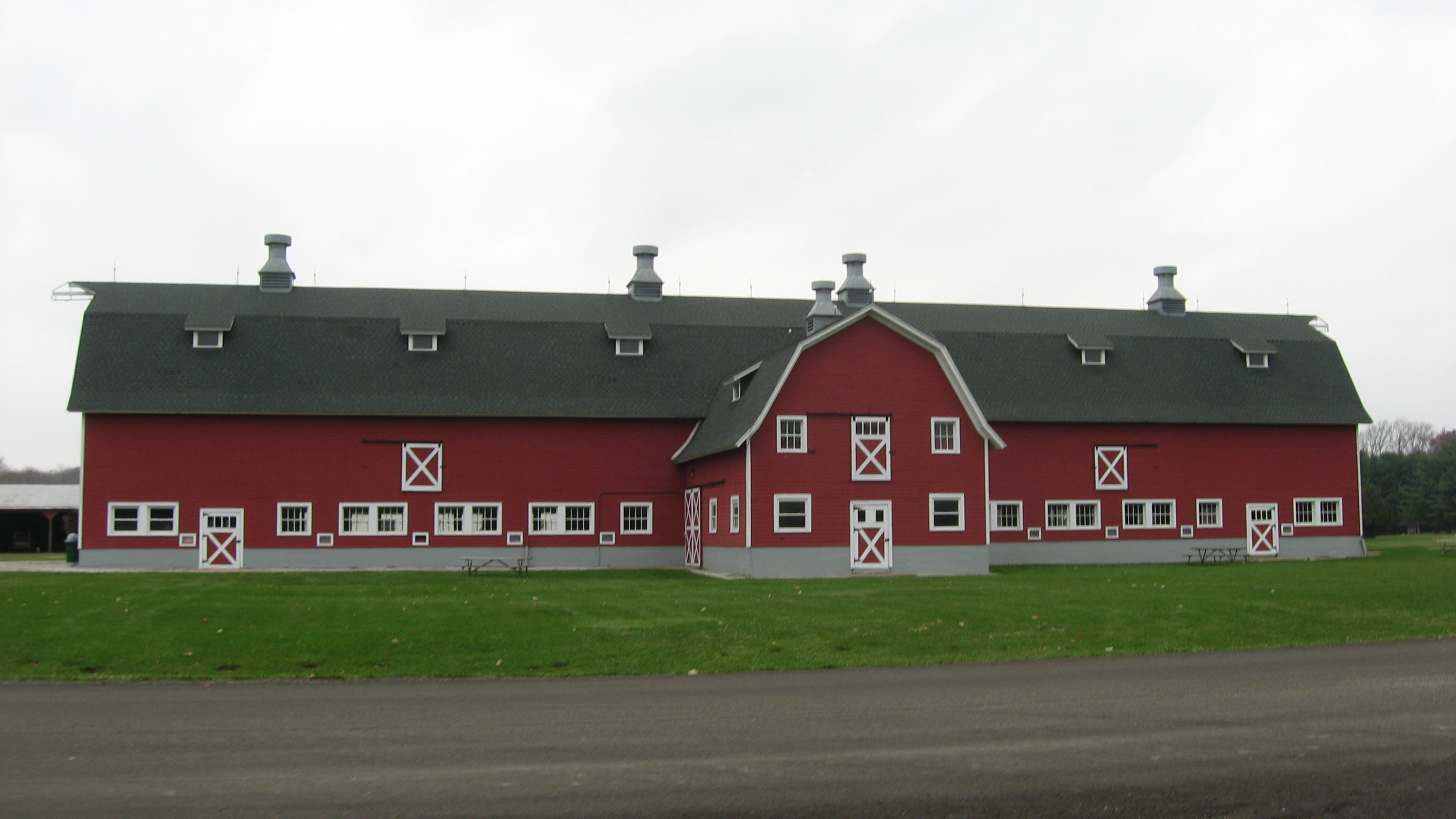
- St Patrick's Farm dairy barn, July 2013

- Location within Indiana Location within the United States
- Location: 50651 Laurel Rd., north of South Bend in Clay Township, St. Joseph County, Indiana
- Coordinates: 41°45′29″N 86°16′03″W
- Area: 38 acres (15 ha)a
- Built: c. 1925
- NRHP reference No.: 13001015
- Added to NRHP: December 31, 2013

St. Patrick's Farm is a historic barn and farm complex located in Clay Township, St. Joseph County, Indiana. The barn was built about 1925, and is a large, "T"-plan, multi-story, high gambrel roofed frame building. It is sheathed in shiplap siding and has two attached wood silos with conical roofs. Also on the property are the contributing concrete silo, gas pump, windmill, pole barn, and a fenced lot. The farm was originally developed by the Sisters of the Holy Cross, then converted to a park in 1966.

It was listed on the National Register of Historic Places in 2013.
