= Thadeus Jay Miller =

American artist

Thad Miller
- Born: Thadeus Jay Miller; February 25, 1933; South Bend, Indiana, US
- Died: February 9, 1986 (aged 52)
- Education: Self taught
- Known for: American Figurative Expressionism, Painting

Thadeus (Thad) Jay Miller (died 1986) was an American artist.

== Biography ==
=== Youth and the New York years ===
Thad Miller was born in St. Joseph County, Indiana and was one of three children born to Frank Douglas Miller and Virgillia Raquelle Galnouer Miller (1900 - 1981). His father opened and operated a dental clinic in 1939 in Converse, Indiana. It is believed that Thad Miller spent most of his childhood in the Converse area. After graduation he lived in Mexico City, moving to New York City in 1956 to pursue acting. He studied drama at the Neighborhood Playhouse with Robert Duvall and studied at the Playhouse with teacher Sydney Pollack. His classmates included Suzanne Pleshette, Keir Dullea and Wayne Rogers. While living, studying, and acting in New York City, he met and married New York-born Luba, nearly 20 years his senior. They briefly lived in Los Angeles until returning to Somerset, Indiana to explore art and farming. "I was an unemployed actor who'd married a businesswoman and I wanted to be a farmer and didn't know how to farm," he told a reporter of the Chronicle-Tribune.

=== Somerset, Indiana ===
His painting years began in Somerset, Indiana after leaving New York City in 1958 and Los Angeles in 1959. Miller's work consisted mostly of portraits using friends and neighbors from the local farming community. He painted in the Flemish old-masters style with a touch of Salvador Dalí's humor added. From 1965 to 1969 he sold more than 200 paintings, mostly to individuals and to fill the walls of five cafeterias, Laughner's owned by Indianapolis restaurateur, Chuck (Chip) Laughner. He quickly became known regionally, but later in life developed a wider following across the country and shipped paintings to Egypt and Australia. His works are now among art auctions across the country.

In 1974, soon after a fall from a window of his house, Miller was stricken with Nephritis, a kidney dysfunction. In January 1975, he went off dialysis after a successful kidney transplant. During the Somerset years, his work was exhibited in the Fort Wayne Museum of Art in Indiana and New York.

== Works and auctions ==
Miller painted thousands of paintings in his lifetime. One of Miller's more well-known portraits depicts Jesus Christ as a black man.

A number of Miller's paintings have appeared in various auctions, including his 1969 Psych Beatles, 72 inches by 47 inches, oil on Masonite or plywood depicting elements of The Beatles, Eric Clapton, and Janis Joplin. Some of his art, such as the Realist Horse, have been turned into Goodwill Industries and auctioned off by them.

Other known works:

- Buffalo Bill, Somerset, 24x18
- Dad with Pig: inscribed For Dad on His 76th Birthday, 30x24, Wickliff Auctioneers, Carmel, Indiana
- Round Barn, 1979, oil on panel, 18x14
- The Moon and the Lion, A dream beginning
- Girl with the Empty Basket
