= Penn-Harris-Madison School Corporation =

School district in Indiana

Location
- Mishawaka, Indiana United States

District information
- Type: Public
- President: Christopher Riley
- Superintendent: Heather Short, Ph.D.

Students and staff
- Students: 11,661
- District mascot: Penn- Kingsmen
- Colors: Penn- Black, Gold, White

Other information
- Website: www.phmschools.org

Penn-Harris-Madison School Corporation, commonly known as simply P-H-M, is a school district located in north-central Indiana, a region locally known as Michiana. The PHM district is located in and named for the three easternmost townships of St. Joseph County: Penn, Harris, and Madison.

The district includes all of Osceola and portions of Granger, Mishawaka, and South Bend. It also includes Wyatt addresses.

== Schools ==
=== Elementary schools ===
- Bittersweet Elementary School
- Elm Road Elementary School
- Elsie Rogers Elementary School
- Horizon Elementary School
- Madison Elementary School
- Mary Frank Elementary School
- Meadow's Edge Elementary School
- Moran Elementary School
- Northpoint Elementary School
- Prairie Vista Elementary School
- Walt Disney Elementary School

=== Middle schools ===
- Discovery Middle School (Granger)
- Grissom Middle School (unincorporated area)
- Schmucker Middle School (unincorporated area)

=== High school ===
- Penn High School (unincorporated area)
