= Indian Village, Indiana =

- Town
- Location of Indian Village in St. Joseph County, Indiana.
- Coordinates: 41°42′51″N 86°13′56″W
- Country: United States
- State: Indiana
- County: St. Joseph
- Township: Clay

Area
  - Total: 0.093 sq mi (0.24 km^{2})
  - Land: 0.093 sq mi (0.24 km^{2})
  - Water: 0 sq mi (0.00 km^{2})
- Elevation: 728 ft (222 m)

Population (2020)
  - Total: 118
  - Density: 1,284.7/sq mi (496.01/km^{2})
- Time zone: UTC-5 (EST)
  - Summer (DST): UTC-5 (EST)
- FIPS code: 18-36306
- GNIS feature ID: 2397006

Indian Village is a town in Clay Township, St. Joseph County, in the U.S. state of Indiana. As of the 2020 census, Indian Village had a population of 118. It is part of the South Bend–Mishawaka, IN-MI, Metropolitan Statistical Area.

== Geography ==
According to the 2010 census, Indian Village has a total area of 0.09 square miles (0.23 km^{2}), all land.

== Education ==
Indian Village is in the South Bend Community School Corporation (SBCSC).

The school zonings are as follows: Darden Elementary School Edison Middle School and Clay High School.

Previously the zoning was as follows: Darden Primary, Tarkington Traditional Elementary, Clay Intermediate, and Clay High.

== Demographics ==
Historical population
Census	Pop.	Note	%±
1950	57		—
1960	82		43.9%
1970	86		4.9%
1980	151		75.6%
1990	142		−6.0%
2000	144		1.4%
2010	133		−7.6%
2020	118		−11.3%
U.S. Decennial Census

=== 2010 census ===
As of the census of 2010, there were 133 people, 60 households, and 39 families living in the town. The population density was 1,477.8 inhabitants per square mile (570.6/km^{2}). There were 63 housing units at an average density of 700.0 per square mile (270.3/km^{2}). The racial makeup of the town was 91.0% White, 4.5% African American, 1.5% Asian, and 3.0% from two or more races.

There were 60 households, of which 16.7% had children under the age of 18 living with them, 53.3% were married couples living together, 6.7% had a female householder with no husband present, 5.0% had a male householder with no wife present, and 35.0% were non-families. 23.3% of all households were made up of individuals, and 11.7% had someone living alone who was 65 years of age or older. The average household size was 2.22 and the average family size was 2.54.

The median age in the town was 51.3 years. 14.3% of residents were under the age of 18; 6.8% were between the ages of 18 and 24; 18.9% were from 25 to 44; 41.3% were from 45 to 64; and 18.8% were 65 years of age or older. The gender makeup of the town was 53.4% male and 46.6% female.

=== 2000 census ===
As of the census of 2000, there were 144 people, 59 households, and 40 families living in the town. The population density was 1,490.2 inhabitants per square mile (575.4/km^{2}). There were 60 housing units at an average density of 620.9 per square mile (239.7/km^{2}). The racial makeup of the town was 95.83% White, 2.08% African American, 0.69% Asian, 0.69% from other races, and 0.69% from two or more races. Hispanic or Latino of any race were 0.69% of the population.

There were 59 households, out of which 23.7% had children under the age of 18 living with them, 61.0% were married couples living together, 1.7% had a female householder with no husband present, and 32.2% were non-families. 23.7% of all households were made up of individuals, and 5.1% had someone living alone who was 65 years of age or older. The average household size was 2.44 and the average family size was 2.78.

In the town, the population was spread out, with 18.1% under the age of 18, 9.0% from 18 to 24, 22.9% from 25 to 44, 32.6% from 45 to 64, and 17.4% who were 65 years of age or older. The median age was 45 years. For every 100 females, there were 105.7 males. For every 100 females age 18 and over, there were 100.0 males.

The median income for a household in the town was $43,750, and the median income for a family was $59,375. Males had a median income of $34,375 versus $25,000 for females. The per capita income for the town was $18,791. There were none of the families and 4.3% of the population living below the poverty line, including no under eighteens and 5.6% of those over 64.
