= Woodland, Indiana =

- Unincorporated community
- Location within Indiana Location within the United States
- Coordinates: 41°33′52″N 86°10′38″W
- Country: United States
- State: Indiana
- County: St. Joseph
- Township: Madison
- Elevation: 853 ft (260 m)
- Time zone: UTC-5 (Eastern (EST))
  - Summer (DST): UTC-4 (EDT)
- ZIP code: 46614
- Area code: 574
- GNIS feature ID: 452840

Woodland is an unincorporated community in Madison Township, St. Joseph County, in the U.S. state of Indiana.

== History ==
A post office was established at Woodland in 1856, and remained in operation until 1907. The community and its vicinity once contained many sawmills.
