= Wyatt, Indiana =

- Unincorporated community Census designated place
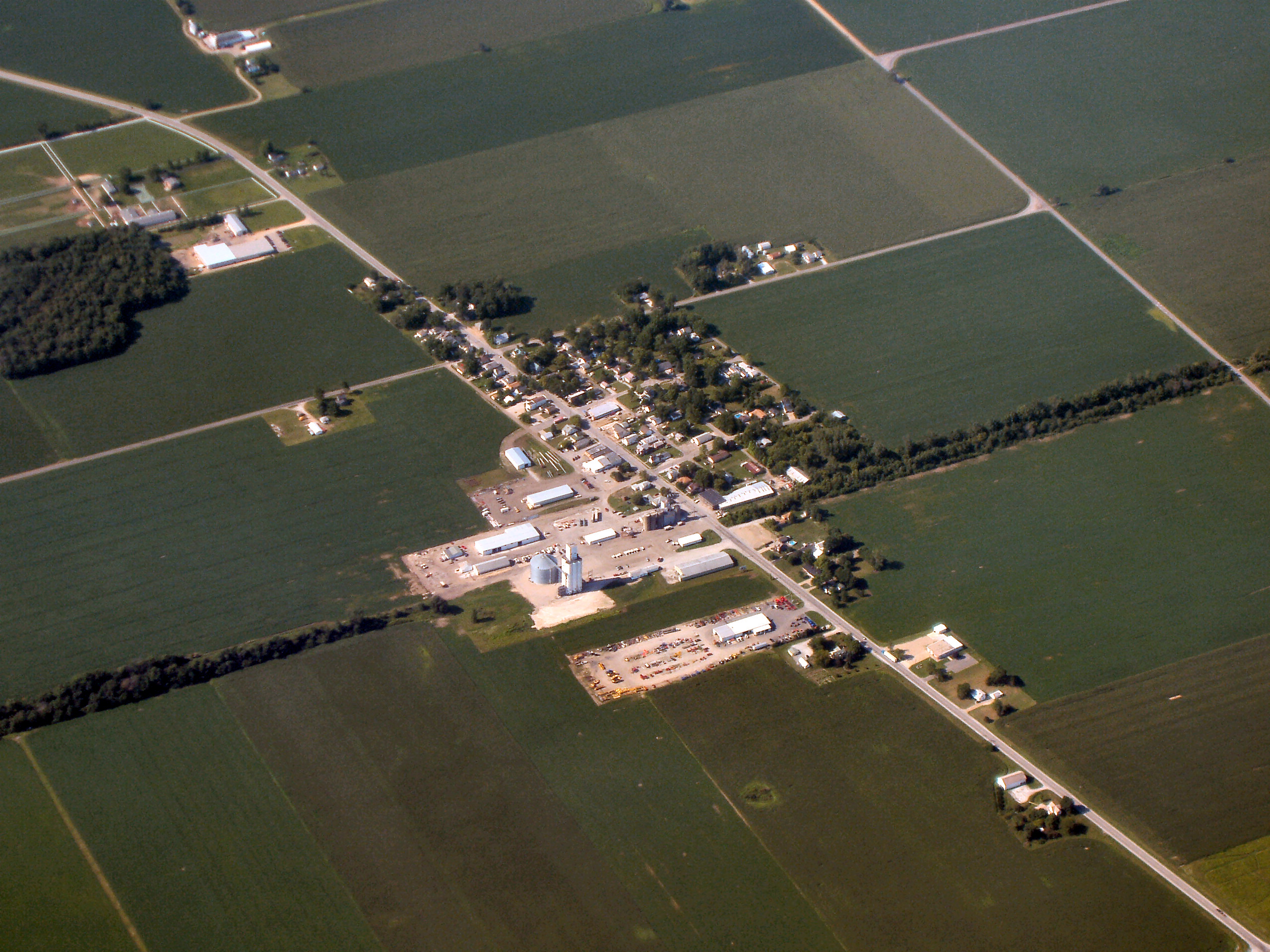
- Wyatt from the air

- Location within Indiana Location within the United States
- Coordinates: 41°31′42″N 86°10′00″W
- Country: United States
- State: Indiana
- County: St. Joseph
- Township: Madison
- Elevation: 837 ft (255 m)
- Time zone: UTC-5 (Eastern (EST))
  - Summer (DST): UTC-4 (EDT)
- ZIP code: 46595
- Area code: 574
- FIPS code: 18-85724
- GNIS feature ID: 2830523

Wyatt is an unincorporated community and census designated place (CDP) located in Madison Township, St. Joseph County, in the U.S. state of Indiana.

The community is part of the South Bend–Mishawaka, IN-MI, Metropolitan Statistical Area. Wyatt has 117 residents.

== History ==
Wyatt was platted in 1894 when the railroad was extended to that point. An old variant name of the community was Littleton.

A post office has been in operation at Wyatt since 1893.

== Geography ==
Wyatt is located on State Road 331 about 10 miles (16 km) south of Mishawaka and 7 miles (11 km) north of Bremen.

== Education ==
Wyatt is located in the Penn-Harris-Madison School District.

== Demographics ==
Historical population
| Census | Pop. | Note | %± |
|---|---|---|---|
| 2023 (est.) | 216 |

The United States Census Bureau defined Wyatt as a census designated place in the 2022 American Community Survey.
