= Georgetown, St. Joseph County, Indiana =

CDP of Georgetown, Indiana
- Census-designated place
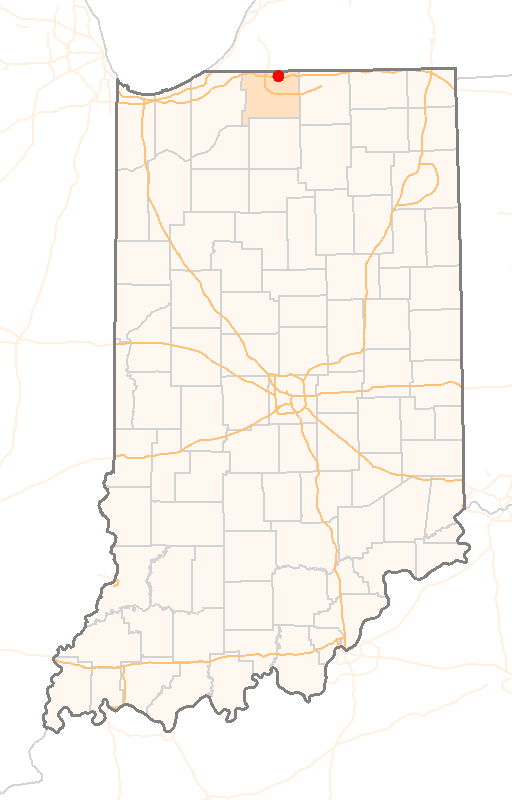
- Location in the state of Indiana
- Coordinates: 41°43′51″N 86°13′35″W
- Country: United States
- State: Indiana
- County: St. Joseph
- Township: Clay

Area
  - Total: 2.0 sq mi (5.1 km^{2})
  - Land: 1.9 sq mi (5.0 km^{2})
  - Water: 0 sq mi (0.0 km^{2})
- Elevation: 735 ft (224 m)

Population (2000)
  - Total: 4,497
  - Density: 2,320/sq mi (895/km^{2})
- Time zone: UTC-5 (Eastern (EST))
  - Summer (DST): UTC-4 (EDT)
- ZIP code: 46637
- Area code: 574
- GNIS feature ID: 2393017

Georgetown is a census-designated place in Clay Township, St. Joseph County, in the U.S. state of Indiana. The population was 4,497 at the 2000 census. It is part of the South Bend–Mishawaka, IN-MI, Metropolitan Statistical Area.

== Geography ==
According to the United States Census Bureau, the CDP has a total area of 2.0 square miles (5.2 km^{2}), of which 1.9 square miles (4.9 km^{2}) is land and 0.51% is water.

== Demographics ==
Historical population
| Census | Pop. | Note | %± |
|---|---|---|---|
| 1990 | 3,993 | | — |
| 2000 | 4,497 | | 12.6% |

As of the census of 2000, there were 4,497 people, 2,040 households, and 1,115 families residing in the CDP. The population density was 2,318.1 inhabitants per square mile (895.0/km^{2}). There were 2,262 housing units at an average density of 1,166.0 per square mile (450.2/km^{2}). The racial makeup of the CDP was 85.35% White, 7.67% African American, 0.60% Native American, 3.47% Asian, 0.07% Pacific Islander, 1.13% from other races, and 1.71% from two or more races. Hispanic or Latino of any race were 2.71% of the population.

There were 2,040 households, out of which 22.4% had children under the age of 18 living with them, 46.3% were married couples living together, 5.6% had a female householder with no husband present, and 45.3% were non-families. 35.4% of all households were made up of individuals, and 10.5% had someone living alone who was 65 years of age or older. The average household size was 2.20 and the average family size was 2.90.

In the CDP, the population was spread out, with 20.1% under the age of 18, 15.0% from 18 to 24, 27.6% from 25 to 44, 22.5% from 45 to 64, and 14.9% who were 65 years of age or older. The median age was 36 years. For every 100 females, there were 95.2 males. For every 100 females age 18 and over, there were 92.2 males.

The median income for a household in the CDP was $51,019, and the median income for a family was $62,010. Males had a median income of $50,157 versus $28,955 for females. The per capita income for the CDP was $24,302. About 1.1% of families and 10.2% of the population were below the poverty line, including 3.2% of those under age 18 and 4.2% of those age 65 or over.
