= Pleasant Valley, St. Joseph County, Indiana =

Pleasant Valley
- Unincorporated community
- Location within Indiana Location within the United States
- Coordinates: 41°41′39″N 86°04′28″W
- Country: United States
- State: Indiana
- County: St. Joseph
- Township: Penn
- Elevation: 751 ft (229 m)
- Time zone: UTC-5 (Eastern (EST))
  - Summer (DST): UTC-4 (EDT)
- ZIP code: 46561
- Area code: 574
- GNIS feature ID: 452738

Pleasant Valley is an unincorporated community in Penn Township, St. Joseph County, in the U.S. state of Indiana.

The community is part of the South Bend–Mishawaka IN-MI, Metropolitan Statistical Area.
