= Penn Township, St. Joseph County, Indiana =

Penn Township
- Township
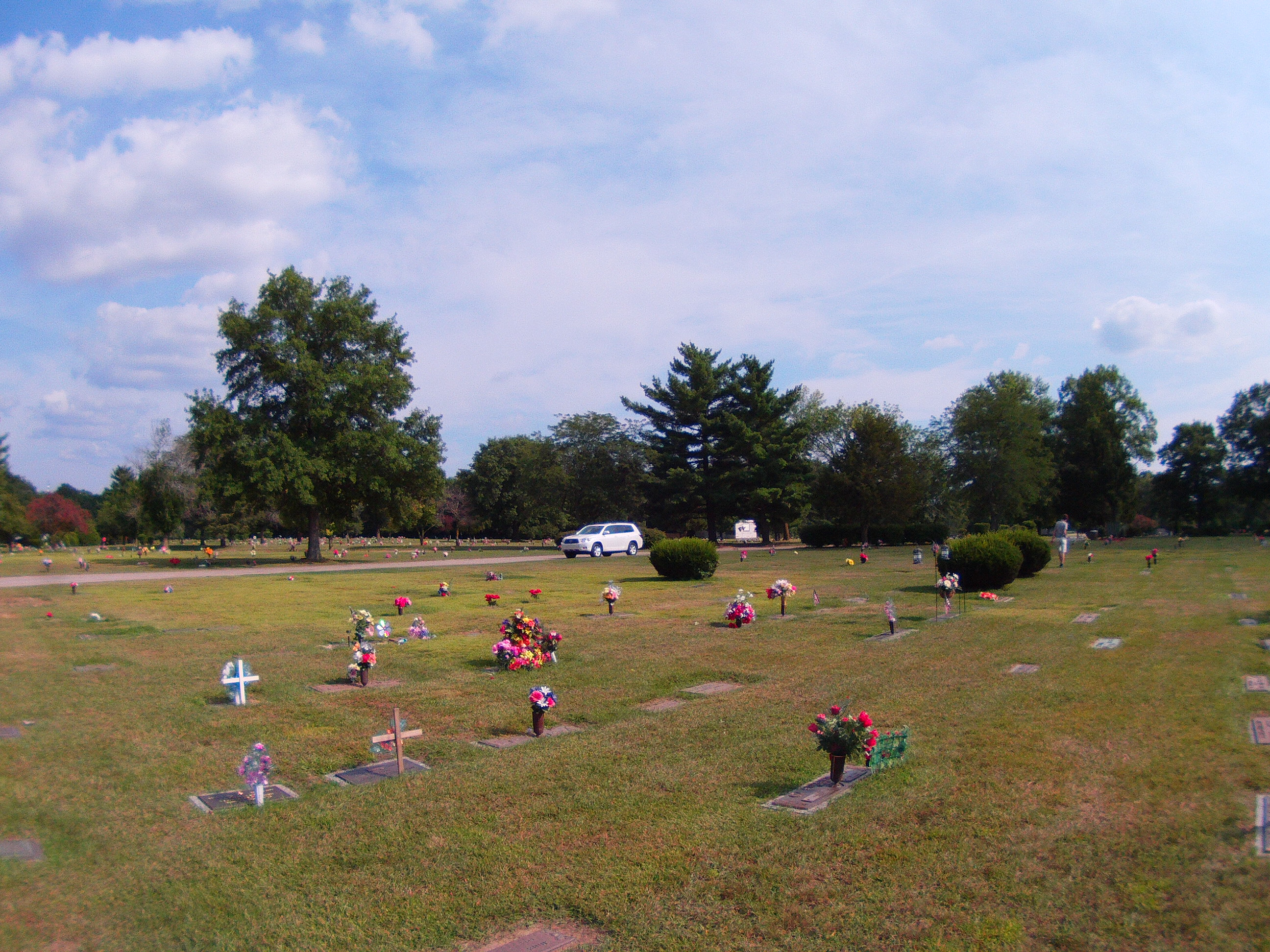
- Chapel Hill Memorial Gardens, in Penn Township

- Location in St. Joseph County
- Coordinates: 41°38′45″N 86°08′04″W
- Country: United States
- State: Indiana
- County: St. Joseph

Government
  - Type: Indiana township

Area
  - Total: 63.58 sq mi (164.67 km^{2})
  - Land: 62.49 sq mi (161.86 km^{2})
  - Water: 1.08 sq mi (2.81 km^{2}) 1.71%
- Elevation: 738 ft (225 m)

Population (2020)
  - Total: 68,698
  - Density: 1,029/sq mi (397.4/km^{2})
- Time zone: UTC-5 (Eastern (EST))
  - Summer (DST): UTC-4 (EDT)
- ZIP codes: 46544, 46545, 46561, 46613, 46614
- Area code: 574
- GNIS feature ID: 453714
- Website: penntownship-sjcin.org

Penn Township is one of thirteen townships in St. Joseph County, in the U.S. state of Indiana. As of the 2000 census, its population was 64,322.

== History ==
Penn Township was formed in 1832.

The Mishawaka Reservoir Caretaker's Residence was listed on the National Register of Historic Places in 1998.

== Geography ==
According to the United States Census Bureau, Penn Township covers an area of 63.58 square miles (164.7 km^{2}); of this, 62.5 square miles (162 km^{2}) (98.29 percent) is land and 1.08 square miles (2.8 km^{2}) (1.71 percent) is water.

=== Cities, towns, villages ===
- Mishawaka (partial)
- Osceola
- South Bend (partial)

=== Unincorporated towns ===
- Hi-View Addition at 41.608381°N 86.178338°W
- Pleasant Valley at 41.694215°N 86.074447°W

(This list is based on USGS data and may include former settlements.)

=== Adjacent townships ===
- Harris Township (north)
- Cleveland Township, Elkhart County (northeast)
- Baugo Township, Elkhart County (east)
- Olive Township, Elkhart County (southeast)
- Madison Township (south)
- Centre Township (west)
- Portage Township (west)
- Clay Township (northwest)

=== Cemeteries ===
The township contains these seven cemeteries: Chapel Hill Memorial Gardens, Eutzler, Fairview, Ferrisville, Pleasant Valley, Saint Josephs and Saint Josephs.

=== Major highways ===
- US 20
- SR 331
- SR 933

=== Lakes ===
- Willow Lake

== Education ==
- Penn-Harris-Madison School Corporation
- School City of Mishawaka

Penn Township residents may obtain a free library card from any branch of the Mishawaka-Penn-Harris Public Library system.

== Political districts ==
- Indiana's 2nd congressional district
- State House District 21
- State House District 5
- State House District 6
- State Senate District 10
- State Senate District 11
- State Senate District 9
