= St. Joseph County, Indiana =

County in Indiana, United States

- County
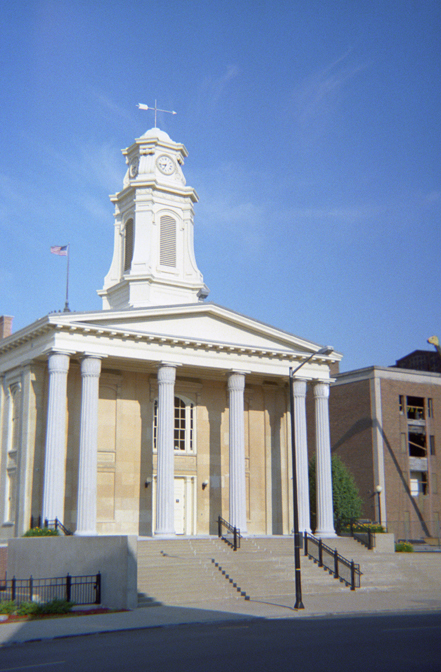
- Old St. Joseph County Courthouse in South Bend, Indiana

- Flag Seal

- Location within the U.S. state of Indiana
- Coordinates: 41.62°N 86.29°W
- Country: United States
- State: Indiana
- Founded: 1830
- Named for: St. Joseph River
- Seat: South Bend
- Largest city: South Bend

Area
  - Total: 461.38 sq mi (1,195.0 km^{2})
  - Land: 457.85 sq mi (1,185.8 km^{2})
  - Water: 3.54 sq mi (9.2 km^{2}) 0.77%

Population (2020)
  - Total: 272,912
  - Estimate (2025): 272,861 ▼
  - Density: 596.07/sq mi (230.15/km^{2})
- Time zone: UTC−5 (Eastern)
  - Summer (DST): UTC−4 (EDT)
- Congressional district: 2nd
- Website: www.sjcindiana.gov
- Indiana county number 71; Fifth-most populous county in Indiana as of 2010

St. Joseph County, colloquially called St. Joe County by residents, is a county located in the U.S. state of Indiana. As of the 2020 census, the population was 272,912, making it the fifth-most populous county in Indiana. Formed in 1830, it was named for the St. Joseph River which flows through it to Lake Michigan. The county seat is South Bend. St. Joseph County is part of the "Michiana" region and the South Bend – Mishawaka metropolitan area.

== Geography ==
According to the 2010 census, the county has a total area of 461.38 square miles (1,195.0 km^{2}), of which 457.85 square miles (1,185.8 km^{2}) (or 99.23%) is land and 3.54 square miles (9.2 km^{2}) (or 0.77%) is water.

=== Cities ===
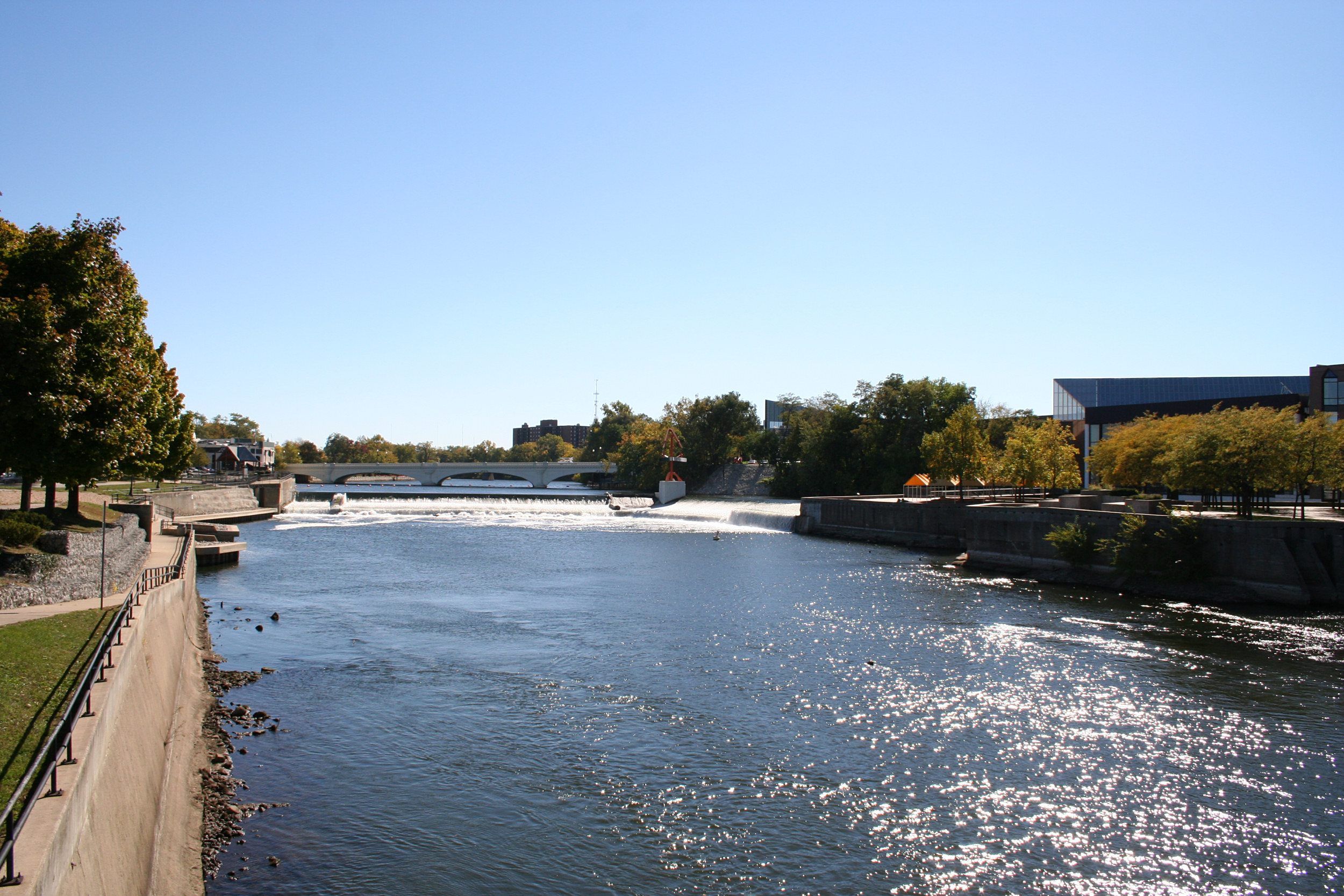
St. Joseph River, flowing into St. Joseph County from Elkhart County (top) through Mishawaka

- Mishawaka
- South Bend

=== Towns ===
- Indian Village
- Lakeville
- New Carlisle
- North Liberty
- Osceola
- Roseland
- Walkerton

=== Census-designated places ===
- Granger
- Notre Dame

=== Other unincorporated places ===
- Ardmore
- Chain-O-Lakes
- Colburn
- Crumstown
- Georgetown
- Gilmer Park
- Gulivoire Park
- Hamilton
- Lydick
- Midway Corners
- Olive
- Pleasant Valley
- State Line
- Terre Coupee
- Woodland
- Wyatt
- Zeigler

=== Townships ===
- Centre
- Clay
- German
- Greene
- Harris
- Liberty
- Lincoln
- Madison
- Olive
- Penn
- Portage
- Union
- Warren

=== Adjacent counties ===
- Berrien County, Michigan (north)
- Cass County, Michigan (northeast)
- Elkhart County (east)
- Marshall County (south)
- Starke County (southwest/CST Border)
- LaPorte County (west/CST Border)

=== Major highways ===
==== Freeways ====
- I-80 / I-90 / Indiana Toll Road
- US 20
- US 31

==== Other highways ====
- US 6
- US 20 Bus.
- US 31 Bus.
- SR 2
- SR 4
- SR 23
- SR 104
- SR 331
- SR 931
- SR 933

== Climate and weather ==
South Bend, Indiana

Climate chart (precipitation, max. and min. temperature)
| J | F | M | A | M | J | J | A | S | O | N | D |
| 2.3 31 16 | 2 36 19 | 2.9 47 28 | 3.6 59 38 | 3.5 71 48 | 4.2 80 58 | 3.7 83 63 | 4 81 61 | 3.8 74 53 | 3.3 62 42 | 3.4 48 33 | 3.1 36 22 |
- █ Average max. and min. temperatures in °F
- █ Precipitation totals in inches
- Source: The Weather Channel
Metric conversion
| J | F | M | A | M | J | J | A | S | O | N | D |
| 58 −1 −9 | 50 2 −7 | 73 8 −2 | 92 15 3 | 89 22 9 | 106 27 14 | 95 28 17 | 101 27 16 | 96 23 12 | 83 17 6 | 86 9 1 | 78 2 −6 |
- █ Average max. and min. temperatures in °C
- █ Precipitation totals in mm

In recent years, average temperatures in South Bend have ranged from a low of 16 °F (−9 °C) in January to a high of 83 °F (28 °C) in July, although a record low of −22 °F (−30 °C) was recorded in January 1943 and a record high of 109 °F (43 °C) was recorded in July 1934. Average monthly precipitation ranged from 1.98 inches (50 mm) in February to 4.19 inches (106 mm) in June.

== Government ==
The county government is a constitutional body, and is granted specific powers by the Constitution of Indiana, and by the Indiana Code.

County Council: The county council is the legislative branch of the county government and controls all the spending and revenue collection in the county. Representatives are elected from county districts. The council members serve four-year terms. They are responsible for setting salaries, the annual budget, and special spending. The council also has limited authority to impose local taxes, in the form of an income and property tax that is subject to state level approval, excise taxes, and service taxes.

| District | Councilperson | Party |
|---|---|---|
| A | Joseph Thomas | Republican |
| B | Amy Drake | Republican |
| C | Dan Schaetzle, President | Republican |
| D | Jenn Shabazz | Democratic |
| E | Diana Hess | Democratic |
| F | Randy Figg | Republican |
| G | Mark Catanzarite, President Pro Tempore | Democratic |
| H | Bryan Tanner, Vice President | Democratic |
| I | Andy Rutten | Republican |

Board of Commissioners: The executive body of the county is made of a board of commissioners. The commissioners are elected in staggered four-year terms. Unlike most counties in Indiana, commissioners are elected based on their districts rather than being elected county-wide, with Lake and Marion being the other exceptions. However, in April 2026, a judge ruled that this violated the Indiana Constitution, making its future status uncertain. One of the commissioners, typically the most senior, serves as president. The commissioners are charged with executing the acts legislated by the council, collecting revenue, and managing the day-to-day functions of the county government.

| District | Commissioner | Party |
|---|---|---|
| 1 | Carl Baxmeyer, President | Republican |
| 2 | Rafael Morton | Democratic |
| 3 | Tony Hazen, Vice President | Republican |

Court: The county maintains several courts: the Circuit Court that hears primarily civil matters and some criminal cases. The judge on the court is elected to a term of six years and must be a licensed attorney in good standing. The judge is assisted by three magistrates appointed by the judge. The Superior Court hears both civil and criminal cases, including small claims and traffic/misdemeanor cases. There are eight judges appointed to the Superior Court by the Governor of Indiana. They are assisted by four magistrates who handle the small claims and traffic/misdemeanor dockets. The Probate Court hears juvenile cases, child abuse or neglect cases, along with probate matters. The judge on the court is elected to a term of six years and must be a licensed attorney in good standing. The judge is assisted by three magistrates and one commissioner (similar to a magistrate) who are appointed by the judge. Decisions from these courts can be appealed to the Indiana Court of Appeals.

| Office | Judge | Party |
|---|---|---|
| Circuit Court | John Broden | Democratic |
| Probate Court | Loris Zappia | Republican |

County Officials: The county has several other elected offices, including sheriff, coroner, auditor, treasurer, recorder, surveyor, and circuit court clerk. Each of these elected officers serves a term of four years and oversees a different part of county government. Members elected to county government positions are required to declare party affiliations and to be residents of the county.

| Office | Officeholder | Party |
|---|---|---|
| Assessor | Michael Castellon | Republican |
| Auditor | John Murphy | Democratic |
| Clerk | Amy Rolfes | Republican |
| Coroner | Patricia Jordan | Republican |
| Prosecutor | Ken Cotter | Democratic |
| Recorder | Candace Brown | Republican |
| Sheriff | William Redman | Democratic |
| Surveyor | Derek Dieter | Republican |
| Treasurer | Mary Beth Wisniewski | Democratic |

== Politics ==
St. Joseph County is part of Indiana's 2nd congressional district and is represented by Republican Rudy Yakym in the United States Congress. Indiana's US Senators are Republicans Jim Banks and Todd Young. St. Joseph County leans Democratic in presidential elections like most counties with college cities; however it has acted as a swing county in the past, such as in the 1970s and 1980s when it trended Republican. In 2000, Democrat Al Gore carried the county but only by 122 votes. The last Republican to win the county was George W. Bush, who flipped the county back in 2004. In 2008, Democrat Barack Obama won the county by 17 points, the first Democrat to gain a full majority since Lyndon B. Johnson in 1964. Since then the county has leaned Democratic but by narrow margins. In 2016 and 2024 the Democratic candidate only carried the county by a plurality; Republican Donald Trump only lost it by 231 votes in 2016.

United States presidential election results for St. Joseph County, Indiana
| Year | Republican | | Democratic | | Third party(ies) | |
| Year | No. | % | No. | % | No. | % |
|---|---|---|---|---|---|---|
| 1888 | 4,929 | 47.40% | 5,257 | 50.56% | 212 | 2.04% |
| 1892 | 5,220 | 44.93% | 6,077 | 52.30% | 322 | 2.77% |
| 1896 | 7,138 | 52.79% | 6,247 | 46.20% | 136 | 1.01% |
| 1900 | 8,127 | 53.10% | 6,948 | 45.40% | 230 | 1.50% |
| 1904 | 11,166 | 62.54% | 5,967 | 33.42% | 721 | 4.04% |
| 1908 | 11,222 | 53.92% | 8,562 | 41.14% | 1,029 | 4.94% |
| 1912 | 3,146 | 20.17% | 5,391 | 34.56% | 7,064 | 45.28% |
| 1916 | 7,961 | 43.02% | 9,709 | 52.47% | 835 | 4.51% |
| 1920 | 17,675 | 56.46% | 12,355 | 39.47% | 1,275 | 4.07% |
| 1924 | 23,682 | 57.65% | 15,056 | 36.65% | 2,344 | 5.71% |
| 1928 | 36,844 | 57.56% | 26,846 | 41.94% | 316 | 0.49% |
| 1932 | 28,198 | 41.13% | 38,026 | 55.46% | 2,339 | 3.41% |
| 1936 | 25,807 | 36.69% | 43,131 | 61.32% | 1,401 | 1.99% |
| 1940 | 36,164 | 44.02% | 45,620 | 55.53% | 374 | 0.46% |
| 1944 | 39,875 | 45.53% | 47,149 | 53.83% | 565 | 0.65% |
| 1948 | 39,593 | 43.58% | 49,866 | 54.89% | 1,387 | 1.53% |
| 1952 | 53,537 | 49.74% | 53,269 | 49.49% | 826 | 0.77% |
| 1956 | 57,827 | 51.41% | 54,152 | 48.15% | 493 | 0.44% |
| 1960 | 53,621 | 45.64% | 63,553 | 54.09% | 325 | 0.28% |
| 1964 | 39,872 | 37.49% | 65,844 | 61.91% | 630 | 0.59% |
| 1968 | 47,114 | 44.09% | 47,414 | 44.37% | 12,336 | 11.54% |
| 1972 | 64,808 | 60.55% | 41,629 | 38.89% | 602 | 0.56% |
| 1976 | 50,358 | 50.20% | 49,156 | 49.00% | 810 | 0.81% |
| 1980 | 50,607 | 49.08% | 44,218 | 42.88% | 8,289 | 8.04% |
| 1984 | 54,404 | 53.08% | 47,513 | 46.36% | 576 | 0.56% |
| 1988 | 49,481 | 50.56% | 48,056 | 49.10% | 327 | 0.33% |
| 1992 | 38,934 | 37.27% | 46,203 | 44.23% | 19,328 | 18.50% |
| 1996 | 38,281 | 41.08% | 45,704 | 49.04% | 9,203 | 9.88% |
| 2000 | 47,581 | 48.81% | 47,703 | 48.94% | 2,190 | 2.25% |
| 2004 | 55,254 | 50.87% | 52,637 | 48.46% | 728 | 0.67% |
| 2008 | 48,510 | 40.85% | 68,710 | 57.87% | 1,519 | 1.28% |
| 2012 | 52,578 | 47.36% | 56,460 | 50.86% | 1,971 | 1.78% |
| 2016 | 52,021 | 46.51% | 52,252 | 46.72% | 7,569 | 6.77% |
| 2020 | 53,164 | 46.13% | 59,896 | 51.98% | 2,178 | 1.89% |
| 2024 | 53,585 | 48.35% | 55,215 | 49.82% | 2,024 | 1.83% |

== Demographics ==
Historical population
| Census | Pop. | Note | %± |
|---|---|---|---|
| 1830 | 287 | | — |
| 1840 | 6,425 | | 2,138.7% |
| 1850 | 10,954 | | 70.5% |
| 1860 | 18,455 | | 68.5% |
| 1870 | 25,322 | | 37.2% |
| 1880 | 33,178 | | 31.0% |
| 1890 | 42,457 | | 28.0% |
| 1900 | 58,881 | | 38.7% |
| 1910 | 84,312 | | 43.2% |
| 1920 | 103,304 | | 22.5% |
| 1930 | 160,033 | | 54.9% |
| 1940 | 161,823 | | 1.1% |
| 1950 | 205,058 | | 26.7% |
| 1960 | 238,614 | | 16.4% |
| 1970 | 245,045 | | 2.7% |
| 1980 | 241,617 | | −1.4% |
| 1990 | 247,052 | | 2.2% |
| 2000 | 265,559 | | 7.5% |
| 2010 | 266,931 | | 0.5% |
| 2020 | 272,912 | | 2.2% |
| 2025 (est.) | 272,861 | ▼ | 0.0% |
U.S. Decennial Census; 1790–1960 1900–1990; 1990–2000 2010

=== Racial and ethnic composition ===
St. Joseph County, Indiana – Racial and ethnic composition Note: the US Census treats Hispanic/Latino as an ethnic category. This table excludes Latinos from the racial categories and assigns them to a separate category. Hispanics/Latinos may be of any race.
| Race / Ethnicity (NH = Non-Hispanic) | Pop 1980 | Pop 1990 | Pop 2000 | Pop 2010 | Pop 2020 | % 1980 | % 1990 | % 2000 | % 2010 | % 2020 |
|---|---|---|---|---|---|---|---|---|---|---|
| White alone (NH) | 214,326 | 214,455 | 213,890 | 201,701 | 188,556 | 88.70% | 86.81% | 80.54% | 75.56% | 69.09% |
| Black or African American alone (NH) | 21,470 | 23,953 | 30,105 | 33,407 | 35,420 | 8.89% | 9.70% | 11.34% | 12.52% | 12.98% |
| Native American or Alaska Native alone (NH) | 512 | 817 | 791 | 791 | 773 | 0.21% | 0.33% | 0.30% | 0.30% | 0.28% |
| Asian alone (NH) | 1,178 | 2,470 | 3,512 | 4,985 | 6,586 | 0.49% | 1.00% | 1.32% | 1.87% | 2.41% |
| Native Hawaiian or Pacific Islander alone (NH) | x | x | 109 | 180 | 159 | x | x | 0.04% | 0.07% | 0.06% |
| Other race alone (NH) | 468 | 156 | 335 | 417 | 1,350 | 0.19% | 0.06% | 0.13% | 0.16% | 0.49% |
| Mixed race or Multiracial (NH) | x | x | 4,260 | 6,055 | 13,492 | x | x | 1.60% | 2.27% | 4.94% |
| Hispanic or Latino (any race) | 3,663 | 5,201 | 12,557 | 19,395 | 26,576 | 1.52% | 2.11% | 4.73% | 7.27% | 9.74% |
| Total | 241,617 | 247,052 | 265,559 | 266,931 | 272,912 | 100.00% | 100.00% | 100.00% | 100.00% | 100.00% |

=== 2020 census ===
As of the 2020 census, the county had a population of 272,912. The median age was 36.8 years. 23.0% of residents were under the age of 18 and 16.5% of residents were 65 years of age or older. For every 100 females there were 95.0 males, and for every 100 females age 18 and over there were 92.3 males age 18 and over.

The racial makeup of the county was 71.4% White, 13.2% Black or African American, 0.5% American Indian and Alaska Native, 2.4% Asian, 0.1% Native Hawaiian and Pacific Islander, 4.5% from some other race, and 8.0% from two or more races. Hispanic or Latino residents of any race comprised 9.7% of the population.

90.0% of residents lived in urban areas, while 10.0% lived in rural areas.

There were 107,307 households in the county, of which 29.4% had children under the age of 18 living in them. Of all households, 42.2% were married-couple households, 20.3% were households with a male householder and no spouse or partner present, and 30.0% were households with a female householder and no spouse or partner present. About 31.0% of all households were made up of individuals and 12.0% had someone living alone who was 65 years of age or older.

There were 118,123 housing units, of which 9.2% were vacant. Among occupied housing units, 65.7% were owner-occupied and 34.3% were renter-occupied. The homeowner vacancy rate was 1.6% and the rental vacancy rate was 10.0%.

=== 2010 census ===
As of the 2010 United States census, there were 266,931 people, 103,069 households, and 66,365 families residing in the county. The population density was 583.0 inhabitants per square mile (225.1/km^{2}). There were 114,849 housing units at an average density of 250.8 per square mile (96.8/km^{2}). The racial makeup of the county was 78.7% white, 12.7% black or African American, 1.9% Asian, 0.4% American Indian, 0.1% Pacific islander, 3.4% from other races, and 2.9% from two or more races. Those of Hispanic or Latino origin made up 7.3% of the population. In terms of ancestry, 25.3% were German, 15.5% were Irish, 12.0% were Polish, 8.5% were English, and 4.5% were American.

Of the 103,069 households, 32.2% had children under the age of 18 living with them, 46.1% were married couples living together, 13.6% had a female householder with no husband present, 35.6% were non-families, and 29.1% of all households were made up of individuals. The average household size was 2.48 and the average family size was 3.07. The median age was 36.2 years.

The median income for a household in the county was $47,697 and the median income for a family was $57,510. Males had a median income of $45,269 versus $31,667 for females. The per capita income for the county was $23,082. About 10.7% of families and 14.6% of the population were below the poverty line, including 21.7% of those under age 18 and 7.8% of those age 65 or over.

== Education ==
=== K–12 schools ===
School districts include:

- John Glenn School Corporation
- LaVille Community Schools
- School City of Mishawaka
- New Prairie United School Corporation
- Penn-Harris-Madison School Corporation
- South Bend Community School Corporation

Public high schools in the county include:

- John Adams High School (South Bend district)
- James Whitcomb Riley High School (South Bend district)
- Washington High School (South Bend district)
- Mishawaka High School (Mishawaka district)
- Penn High School (Penn-Harris district)

Clay High School (South Bend district) closed in 2024.

Private schools

Catholic schools on this list are operated by or associated with the Roman Catholic Diocese of Fort Wayne–South Bend

- Christ the King (grades K–8)
- Community Baptist Christian School (grades K–12)
- Corpus Christi (grades K–8)
- Covenant Christian School (grades K–8)
- Granger Christian School (grades K–12)
- Holy Cross Elementary (grades K–8)
- Holy Family Elementary (grades K–8)
- Ironwood Christian School (grades K–12)
- Marian High School (grades 9–12)
- Michiana Christian School (grades K–12)
- Mishawaka Catholic School (St. Bavo Campus, St. Joseph Campus & St. Monica Campus) (grades K–8)
- Mishawaka First Baptist School (grades K–12)
- North Liberty Christian School (grades K–5)
- Our Lady of Hungary (grades K–8)
- Queen of Peace School (grades K–8)
- Resurrection Lutheran Academy (grades K–8)
- Saint Joseph High School (grades 9–12)
- St. Adalbert Elementary (grades K–8)
- St. Anthony de Padua School (grades K–8)
- St. John the Baptist Elementary (grades K–8)
- St. Joseph Grade School (grades K–8)
- St. Jude Elementary (grades K–8)
- St. Mary of the Assumption School (grades K–8)
- St. Matthew Elementary (grades K–8)
- St. Patrick School (grades K–6]
- St. Pius X School (grades Pre K–8)
- South Bend Christian Center (grades K–12)
- South Bend Junior Academy (grades K–8)
- Stanley Clark School (grades K–8)
- Trinity School at Greenlawn (grades 6–12)

=== Colleges and universities ===
- Bethel University
- Brown Mackie College (closed in 2017)
- Holy Cross College
- Indiana University South Bend
- Ivy Tech North Central
- St. Mary's College
- University of Notre Dame

== St. Joseph County Public Library ==
=== History ===
The St. Joseph County Public Library was founded in 1889. Originally known as the South Bend Public Library, it was founded by the South Bend School Corporation and managed by Evelyn Humphries out of a floor of the Oliver Opera House. Humphries soon secured funding for the building of the Main Library which opened to the public in 1896. It was known as "The Castle" due to its unique architecture. In 1902, Virginia Tutt became the second library director. She opened the first library branch in Washington High School in 1918, which often served as a community center for Polish and Hungarian immigrants. The Betty Ruth Spiro Memorial Library replaced "The Castle" in 1959 as the new main library building in downtown South Bend. This building served the community until its renovation in 1992 led to a fire and subsequent damage from smoke and fire sprinklers. The renovation continued and the library was able to open 7 days later thanks to help from the community.

In 2016, Main Library began looking at the need for an expanded space in downtown South Bend to meet the needs of the growing community. After working with consultants and architects, it was decided in October 2018 that Main Library will expand to include a community learning center, renovated exterior, and inner courtyard. St. Joseph County is considering cutting the library's funding by almost $500,000 a year. As a result, on September 5, 2019, hundreds of residents protested in the streets, and all library branches closed early. Overflow crowds backed the county council meeting to show their support for the library. The library ended up losing the funding two years later.

=== Branches ===
- Main Library
- Centre Township Branch
- Francis Branch
- German Township Branch
- Lakeville Branch
- LaSalle Branch
- North Liberty Branch
- River Park Branch
- Tutt Branch
- Western Branch

=== Library Services ===
==== Studio 304 ====
Technology hub where patrons can explore 3D printing, poster printing, Adobe Creative Suite, gaming, virtual reality rigs, and recording rooms.

==== Local and family history ====
Books, newspapers, yearbooks, magazines, and other items of local significance can be examined. Online archives and genealogical websites are also available to reference in the creation of family trees.

==== Databases ====
SJCPL subscribes to over 50 databases that can aid in research, education, grant writing, and business development.

==== Homebound delivery ====
Library staff members will bring library materials directly to your home if requested.

== Notable people ==
- Thadeus Jay Miller, artist

== See also ==
- List of public art in St. Joseph County, Indiana
- National Register of Historic Places listings in St. Joseph County, Indiana
