= Colburn, St. Joseph County, Indiana =

Colburn
- Unincorporated town
- Location within Indiana Location within the United States
- Coordinates: 41°32′56″N 86°16′6″W
- Country: United States
- State: Indiana
- County: St. Joseph
- Township: Union
- Elevation: 663 ft (202 m)
- Time zone: UTC-5 (Eastern (EST))
  - Summer (DST): UTC-4 (EDT)
- GNIS feature ID: 452571

Colburn is an unincorporated town in Union Township, St. Joseph County, in the U.S. state of Indiana.

The community is part of the South Bend–Mishawaka, IN-MI, Metropolitan Statistical Area.
