= Osceola, Indiana =

- Town
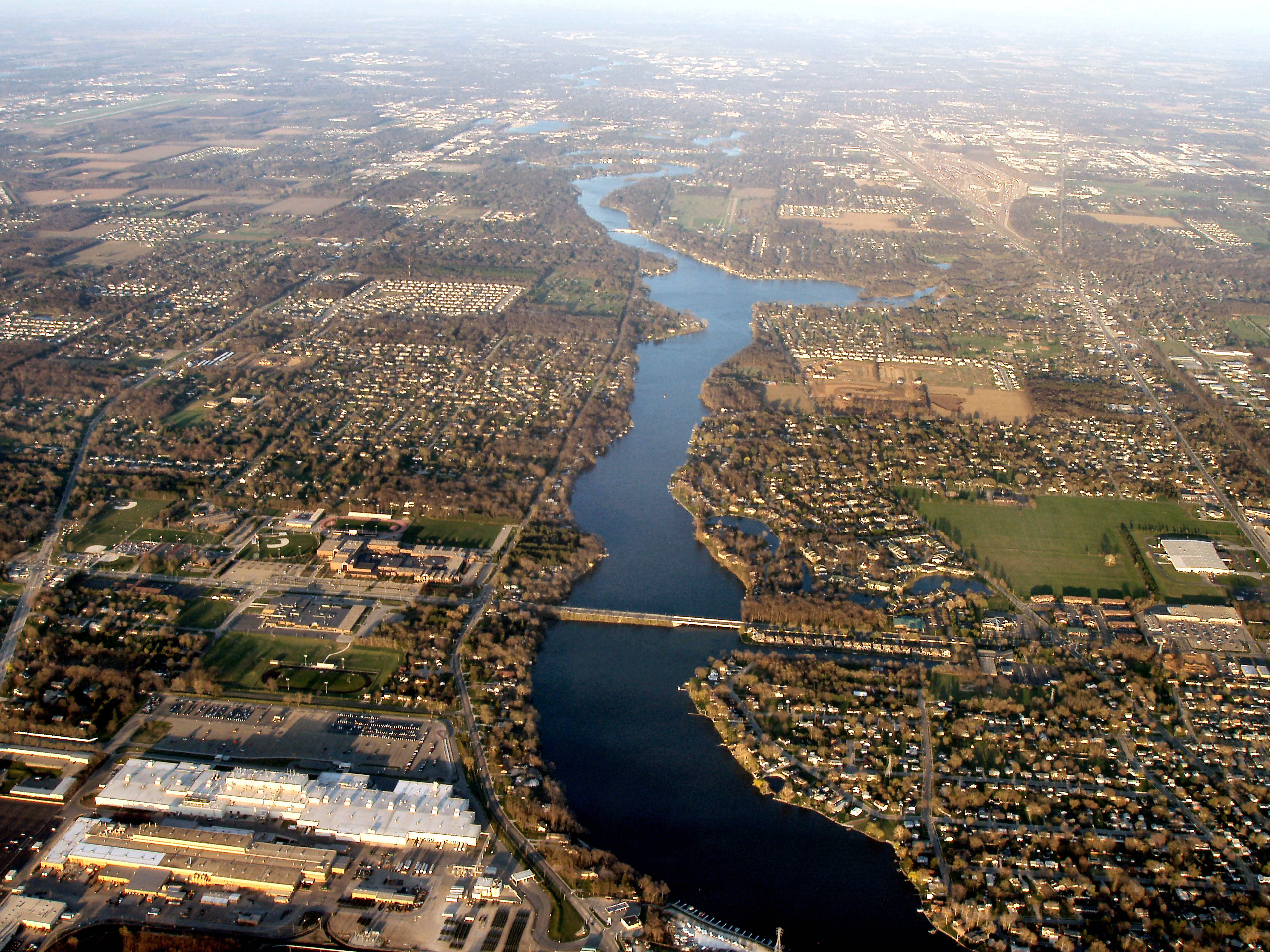
- Osceola, with St. Joe River flowing west to Mishawaka (bottom). Baugo Bay is in the upper right. Elkhart is in the distance.

- Logo

- Location of Osceola in St. Joseph County, Indiana.
- Coordinates: 41°39′53″N 86°04′44″W
- Country: United States
- State: Indiana
- County: St. Joseph
- Township: Penn

Area
  - Total: 1.36 sq mi (3.53 km^{2})
  - Land: 1.36 sq mi (3.52 km^{2})
  - Water: 0.0039 sq mi (0.01 km^{2})
- Elevation: 735 ft (224 m)

Population (2020)
  - Total: 2,590
  - Density: 1,905.9/sq mi (735.87/km^{2})
- Time zone: UTC-5 (Eastern (EST))
  - Summer (DST): UTC-4 (EDT)
- ZIP code: 46561
- Area code: 574
- FIPS code: 18-57114
- GNIS feature ID: 2396838
- Website: osceola.in.gov

Osceola is a town in Penn Township, St. Joseph County, in the U.S. state of Indiana. As of the 2020 census, Osceola had a population of 2,590. It is part of the South Bend–Mishawaka, IN-MI, Metropolitan Statistical Area.

== History ==
Osceola was platted in 1837. The town was named after Osceola, leader of the Seminole. A post office has been in operation at Osceola since 1854.

== Geography ==
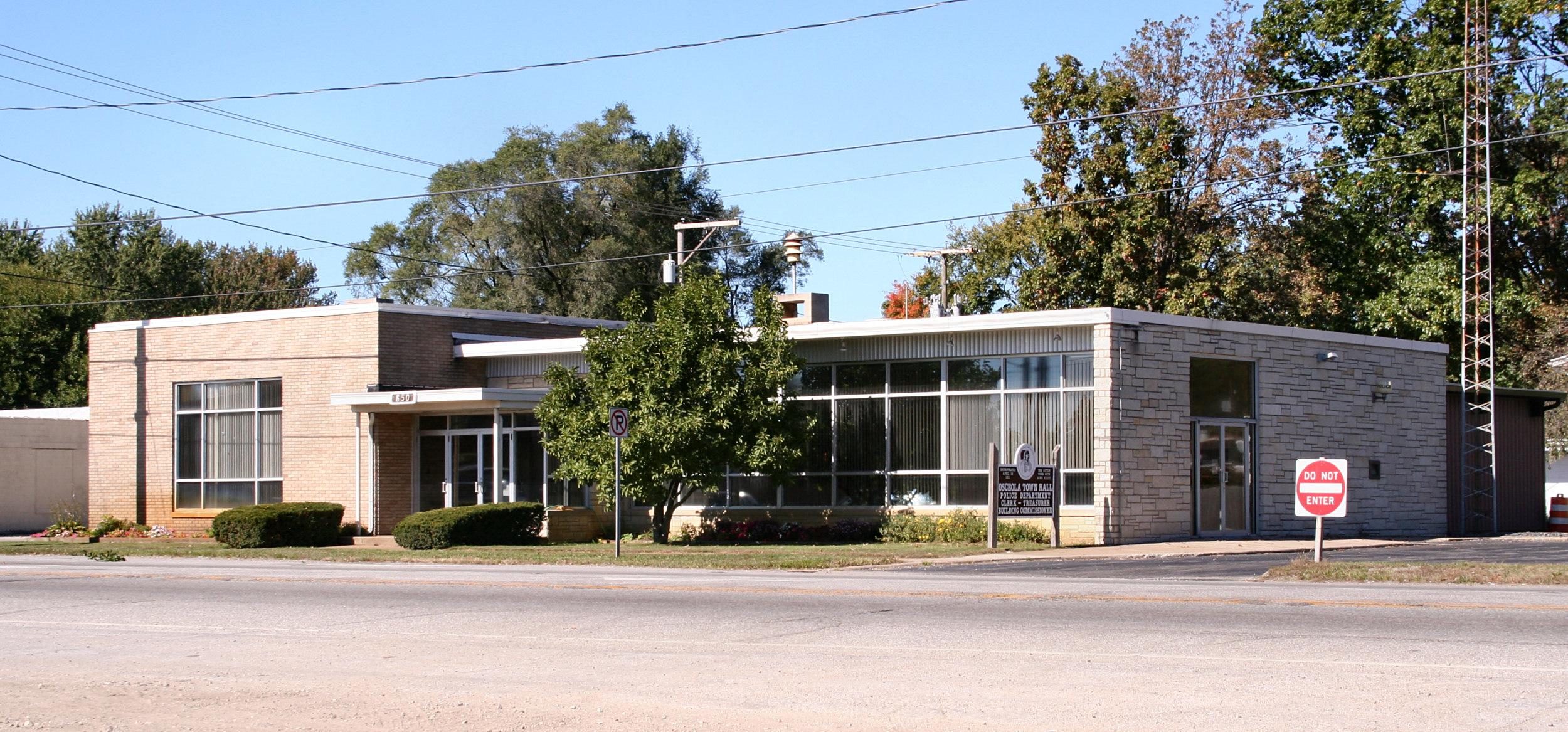
Osceola town hall.

According to the 2010 census, Osceola has a total area of 1.37 square miles (3.55 km^{2}), of which 1.36 square miles (3.52 km^{2}) (or 99.27%) is land and 0.01 square miles (0.03 km^{2}) (or 0.73%) is water. Osceola is also home to Ferrettie/Baugo Creek County Park, a 214-acre park with an extensive trail network along Baugo Creek.

== Demographics ==
Historical population
Census	Pop.	Note	%±
1880	129		—
1930	432		—
1940	498		15.3%
1950	1,091		119.1%
1960	1,350		23.7%
1970	1,572		16.4%
1980	1,990		26.6%
1990	1,999		0.5%
2000	1,859		−7.0%
2010	2,463		32.5%
2020	2,590		5.2%
U.S. Decennial Census

Located in the Penn-Harris-Madison School Corporation, Osceola spans both sides of the St. Joseph River, although the majority is on the south side. Osceola is divided once again by the railroad.

=== 2020 census ===
As of the 2020 census, Osceola had a population of 2,590. The median age was 37.1 years. 27.0% of residents were under the age of 18 and 14.5% of residents were 65 years of age or older. For every 100 females, there were 101.4 males, and for every 100 females age 18 and over, there were 99.5 males age 18 and over.

100.0% of residents lived in urban areas, while 0.0% lived in rural areas.

There were 971 households in Osceola, of which 35.9% had children under the age of 18 living in them. Of all households, 51.6% were married-couple households, 18.2% were households with a male householder and no spouse or partner present, and 22.3% were households with a female householder and no spouse or partner present. About 22.0% of all households were made up of individuals and 8.4% had someone living alone who was 65 years of age or older.

There were 1,030 housing units, of which 5.7% were vacant. The homeowner vacancy rate was 1.5% and the rental vacancy rate was 6.8%.

Racial composition as of the 2020 census
Race	Number	Percent
White	2,263	87.4%
Black or African American	52	2.0%
American Indian and Alaska Native	11	0.4%
Asian	40	1.5%
Native Hawaiian and Other Pacific Islander	5	0.2%
Some other race	13	0.5%
Two or more races	206	8.0%
Hispanic or Latino (of any race)	98	3.8%

=== 2010 census ===
As of the census of 2010, there were 2,463 people, 905 households, and 672 families living in the town. The population density was 1,811.0 inhabitants per square mile (699.2/km^{2}). There were 979 housing units at an average density of 719.9 per square mile (278.0/km^{2}). The racial makeup of the town was 95.5% White, 1.4% African American, 0.2% Native American, 0.7% Asian, 0.2% Pacific Islander, 0.3% from other races, and 1.7% from two or more races. Hispanic or Latino of any race were 2.1% of the population.

There were 905 households, of which 39.4% had children under the age of 18 living with them, 54.9% were married couples living together, 12.8% had a female householder with no husband present, 6.5% had a male householder with no wife present, and 25.7% were non-families. 19.4% of all households were made up of individuals, and 7.3% had someone living alone who was 65 years of age or older. The average household size was 2.72 and the average family size was 3.09.

The median age in the town was 35.7 years. 27.4% of residents were under the age of 18; 7.4% were between the ages of 18 and 24; 28.8% were from 25 to 44; 25.4% were from 45 to 64; and 10.9% were 65 years of age or older. The gender makeup of the town was 50.6% male and 49.4% female.

=== 2000 census ===
As of the census of 2000, there were 1,859 people, 714 households, and 521 families living in the town. The population density was 1,361.2 inhabitants per square mile (525.6/km^{2}). There were 739 housing units at an average density of 541.1 per square mile (208.9/km^{2}). The racial makeup of the town was 97.79% White, 0.43% African American, 0.11% Asian, 0.75% from other races, and 0.91% from two or more races. Hispanic or Latino of any race were 0.70% of the population.

There were 714 households, out of which 33.6% had children under the age of 18 living with them, 57.3% were married couples living together, 11.5% had a female householder with no husband present, and 27.0% were non-families. 21.4% of all households were made up of individuals, and 8.5% had someone living alone who was 65 years of age or older. The average household size was 2.60 and the average family size was 3.01.

In the town, the population was spread out, with 25.9% under the age of 18, 8.2% from 18 to 24, 29.3% from 25 to 44, 24.1% from 45 to 64, and 12.5% who were 65 years of age or older. The median age was 38 years. For every 100 females, there were 101.6 males. For every 100 females age 18 and over, there were 99.7 males.

The median income for a household in the town was $43,657, and the median income for a family was $45,707. Males had a median income of $33,036 versus $25,000 for females. The per capita income for the town was $18,051. About 3.4% of families and 3.7% of the population were below the poverty line, including 4.7% of those under age 18 and 4.7% of those age 65 or over.

== Transportation ==
Since fall 2009, Interurban Trolley's Bittersweet/Mishawaka route has connected Osceola to the nearby cities of Elkhart and Mishawaka. Riders can transfer to South Bend-Mishawaka region's TRANSPO bus system in Mishawaka and other Interurban Trolley bus routes at Elkhart.

== Education ==
It is in Penn-Harris-Madison School Corporation. It is zoned to Moran Elementary School in Osceola, Grissom Middle School, and Penn High School.
