= Mishawaka Reservoir Caretaker's Residence =

Historic house in Indiana, United States

- U.S. National Register of Historic Places
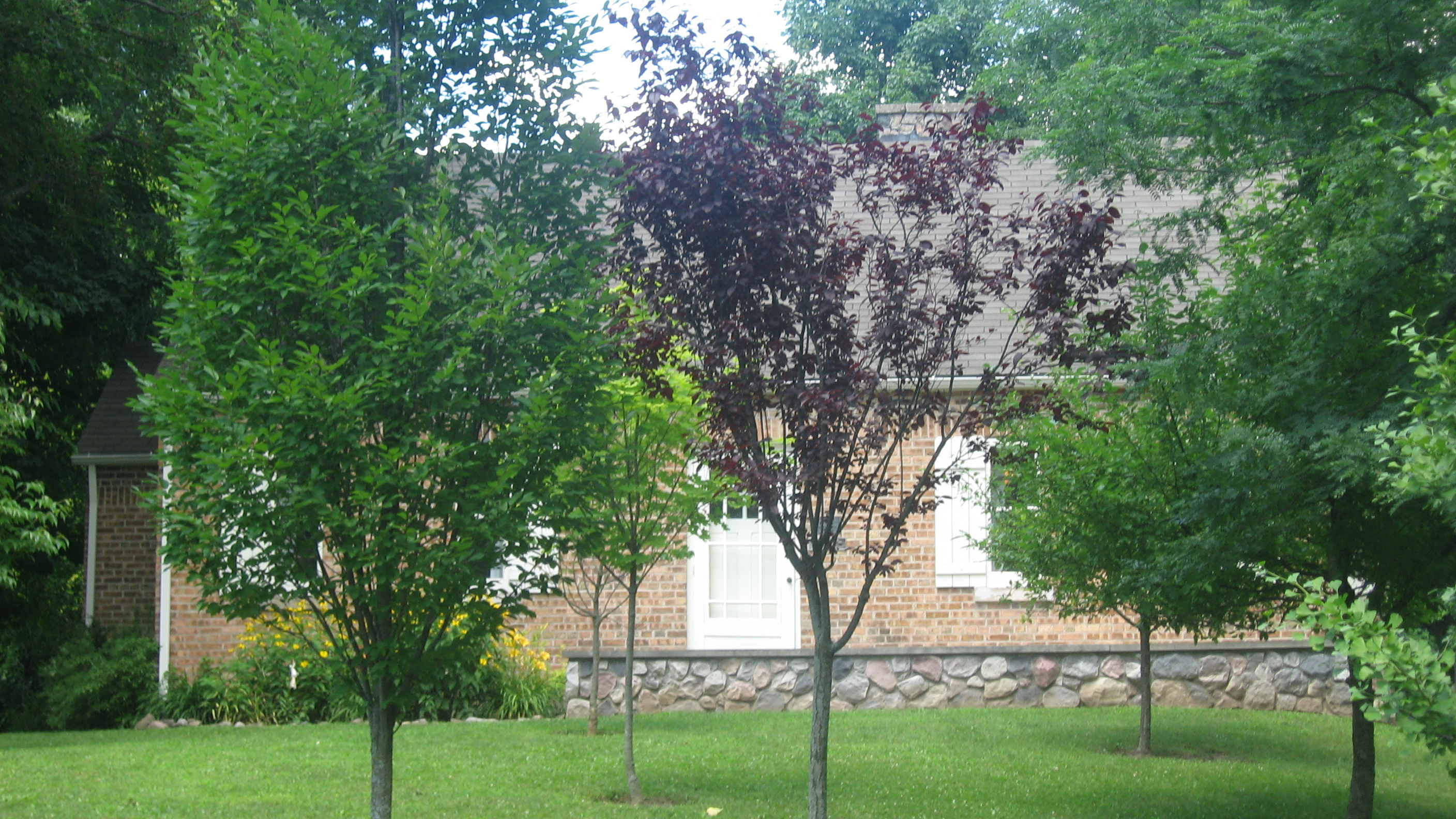
- Mishawaka Reservoir Caretaker's Residence, July 2013

- Location within Indiana Location within the United States
- Location: 16581 Chandler Blvd., south of Mishawaka in Penn Township, St. Joseph County, Indiana
- Coordinates: 41°38′19″N 86°11′4″W
- Area: less than one acre
- Built: 1938
- Built by: Works Progress Administration
- Architectural style: Late 19th And 20th Century Revivals
- NRHP reference No.: 98001053
- Added to NRHP: August 14, 1998

Mishawaka Reservoir Caretaker's Residence is a historic home located in Penn Township, St. Joseph County, Indiana. The house was built in 1938 by the Works Progress Administration as a home for the caretaker of the Mishawaka Reservoir. It is a 1 1/2-story, rectangular, solid brick dwelling. It has a three-sided bay window, gable roof, and fieldstone chimney. The building was moved to its present location in 1995 to save it from demolition.

It was listed on the National Register of Historic Places in 1998.
