= Roseland, Indiana =

- Town
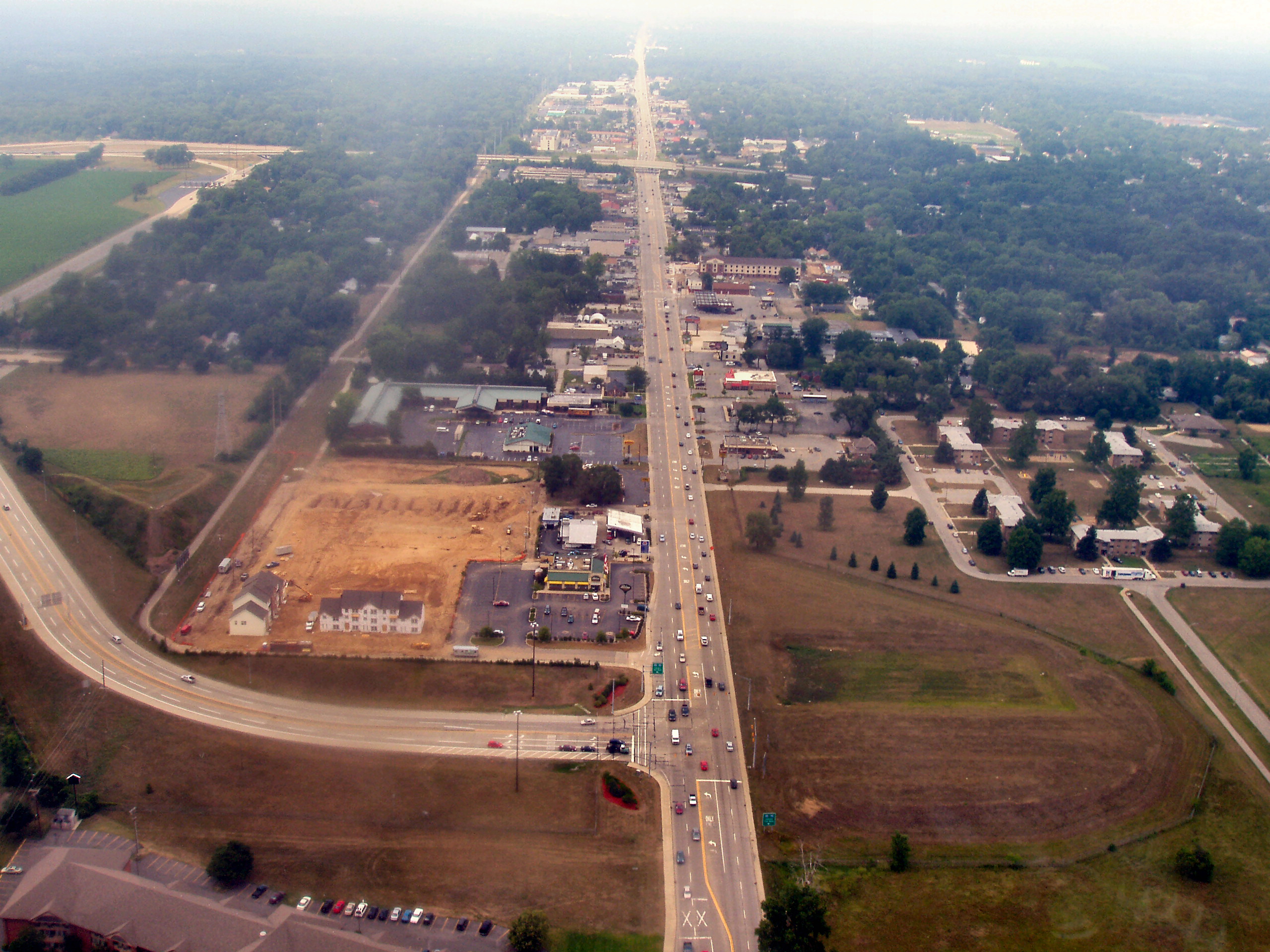
- Roseland from the air, looking north

- Flag Logo

- Location of Roseland in St. Joseph County, Indiana.
- Coordinates: 41°43′04″N 86°14′58″W
- Country: United States
- State: Indiana
- County: St. Joseph
- Township: Clay

Area
  - Total: 0.39 sq mi (1.00 km^{2})
  - Land: 0.39 sq mi (1.00 km^{2})
  - Water: 0 sq mi (0.00 km^{2})
- Elevation: 732 ft (223 m)

Population (2020)
  - Total: 854
  - Density: 2,217.5/sq mi (856.19/km^{2})
- Time zone: UTC-5 (Eastern (EST))
  - Summer (DST): UTC-4 (EDT)
- FIPS code: 18-65988
- GNIS feature ID: 2396890
- Website: townofroseland.us

Roseland is a town in Clay Township, St. Joseph County, in the U.S. state of Indiana. As of the 2020 census, Roseland had a population of 854. It is part of the South Bend–Mishawaka, IN-MI, Metropolitan Statistical Area.

Roseland is known as "The Gateway Town", on account of its location at the Notre Dame/South Bend exit of the Indiana Toll Road (Interstate 80/90).

== Geography ==
According to the 2010 census, Roseland has a total area of 0.38 square miles (0.98 km^{2}), all land.

== Demographics ==
Historical population
Census	Pop.	Note	%±
1930	777		—
1940	782		0.6%
1950	984		25.8%
1960	971		−1.3%
1970	895		−7.8%
1980	832		−7.0%
1990	706		−15.1%
2000	1,809		156.2%
2010	630		−65.2%
2020	854		35.6%
U.S. Decennial Census

=== 2010 census ===
As of the census of 2010, there were 630 people, 287 households, and 148 families living in the town. The population density was 1,657.9 inhabitants per square mile (640.1/km^{2}). There were 348 housing units at an average density of 915.8 per square mile (353.6/km^{2}). The racial makeup of the town was 87.5% White, 2.7% African American, 1.0% Native American, 4.6% Asian, 0.2% Pacific Islander, 1.9% from other races, and 2.2% from two or more races. Hispanic or Latino of any race were 5.1% of the population.

There were 287 households, of which 20.6% had children under the age of 18 living with them, 40.8% were married couples living together, 6.6% had a female householder with no husband present, 4.2% had a male householder with no wife present, and 48.4% were non-families. 32.8% of all households were made up of individuals, and 9.8% had someone living alone who was 65 years of age or older. The average household size was 2.20 and the average family size was 2.71.

The median age in the town was 35.2 years. 14.3% of residents were under the age of 18; 16.5% were between the ages of 18 and 24; 30% were from 25 to 44; 26.1% were from 45 to 64; and 13.2% were 65 years of age or older. The gender makeup of the town was 48.9% male and 51.1% female.

=== 2000 census ===
As of the census of 2000, there were 645 people (corrected count), 311 households, and 171 families living in the town. The population density was 1,612.5 inhabitants per square mile (622.6/km^{2}). There were 336 housing units at an average density of 864.7 per square mile (333.9/km^{2}). The racial makeup of the town was 91.60% White, 1.16% African American, 0.61% Native American, 2.16% Asian, 2.93% from other races, and 1.55% from two or more races. Hispanic or Latino of any race were 5.31% of the population.

There were 311 households, out of which 20.9% had children under the age of 18 living with them, 43.4% were married couples living together, 8.0% had a female householder with no husband present, and 44.7% were non-families. 37.9% of all households were made up of individuals, and 12.9% had someone living alone who was 65 years of age or older. The average household size was 2.06 and the average family size was 2.73.

In the town, the population was spread out, with 6.4% under the age of 18, 66.4% from 18 to 24, 13.2% from 25 to 44, 7.7% from 45 to 64, and 6.3% who were 65 years of age or older. The median age was 21 years. For every 100 females, there were 21.1 males. For every 100 females age 18 and over, there were 18.5 males.

The median income for a household in the town was $33,214, and the median income for a family was $38,750. Males had a median income of $35,000 versus $23,611 for females. The per capita income for the town was $9,450. About 5.1% of families and 5.7% of the population were below the poverty line, including 7.7% of those under age 18 and 3.7% of those age 65 or over.

== Government ==
Roseland was incorporated in 1916. The town has three council members and a Clerk-Treasurer.

=== Politics ===
In the 2023 municipal election, candidates affiliated with the Indiana Redemption Party won a majority of seats on the Roseland Town Council and the Clerk-Treasurer's office. The Indiana Redemption Party (IRP) was founded by political entrepreneur Shane Inez and is the state affiliate of the Redemption Party. IRP is a local political organization that identifies with principles of Christian democracy and community-based governance. Its platform includes an emphasis on civic engagement, local accountability, and policy approaches shaped by faith-informed values.

== Education ==
Roseland is in the South Bend Community School Corporation (SBCSC).

The school zonings are as follows: Darden Elementary School Edison Middle School and Clay High School.

Previously residents were zoned as follows based on their street location: Darden Primary, Tarkington Traditional Elementary, Clay Intermediate or Brown Intermediate (depending on the section), and Clay High.

== See also ==
- LaSalle Trail
