= Notre Dame, Indiana =

Census-designated place in the United States

- Census-designated place
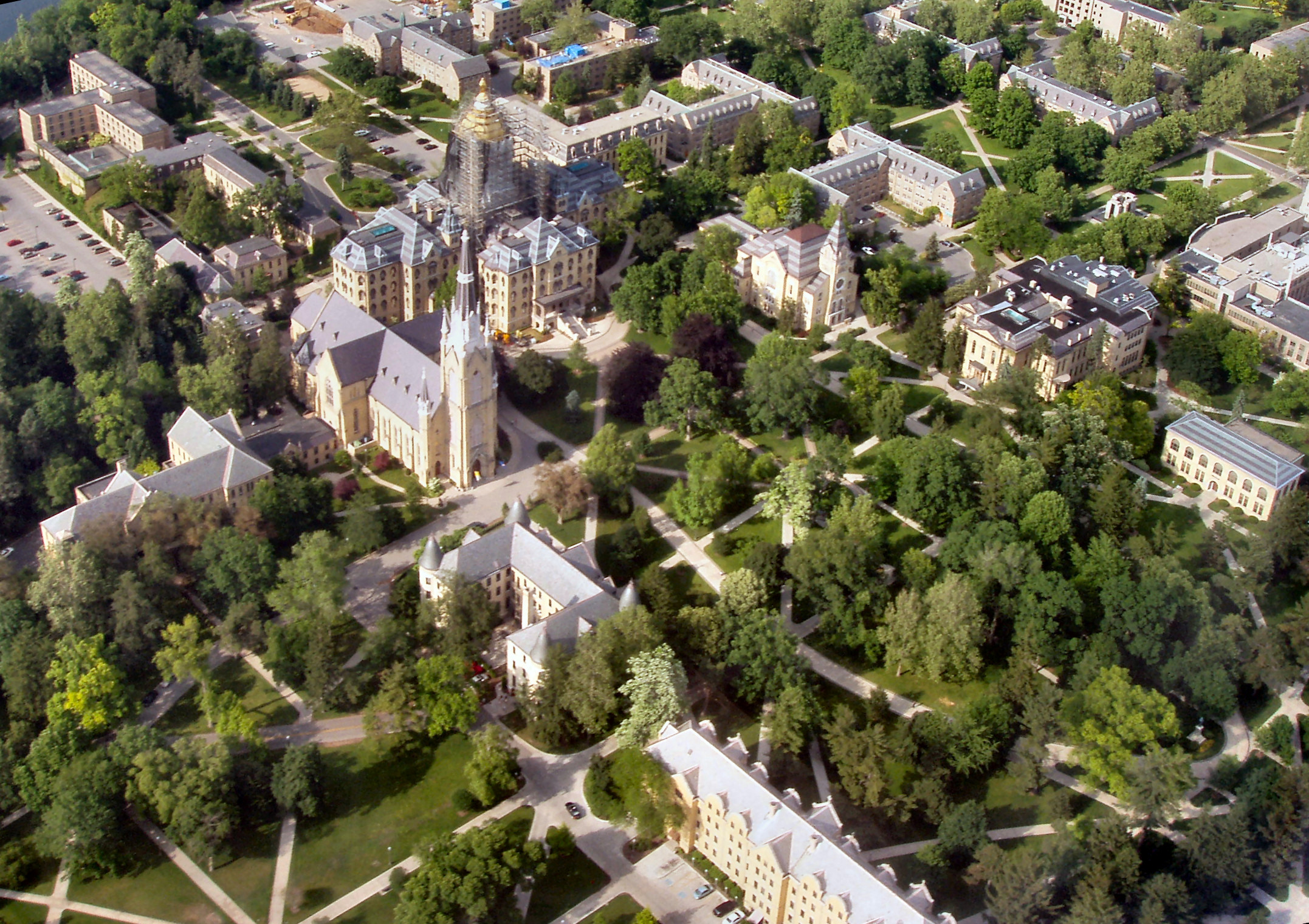
- An aerial view of the University of Notre Dame's center campus

- Location of Notre Dame in St. Joseph County, Indiana

- Location within Indiana Location within the United States
- Coordinates: 41°42′05″N 86°14′45″W
- Country: United States
- State: Indiana
- County: St. Joseph
- Township: Clay, Portage

Area
  - Total: 1.25 sq mi (3.23 km^{2})
  - Land: 1.18 sq mi (3.06 km^{2})
  - Water: 0.066 sq mi (0.17 km^{2})
- Elevation: 732 ft (223 m)

Population (2020)
  - Total: 7,234
  - Density: 6,122.1/sq mi (2,363.75/km^{2})
- Time zone: UTC-5 (Eastern (EST))
  - Summer (DST): UTC-4 (EDT)
- ZIP code: 46556
- Area code: 574
- GNIS feature ID: 2583462

Notre Dame (/ˌnoʊtərˈdeɪm/ NOH-tər-DAYM) is a census-designated place and unincorporated community north of the city of South Bend in St. Joseph County, in the U.S. state of Indiana. It includes the campuses of three Catholic colleges: the University of Notre Dame, Saint Mary's College, and Holy Cross College. Notre Dame is split between Clay and Portage townships. As of the 2020 census, its population was 7,234.

== Demographics ==
Historical population
Census	Pop.	Note	%±
2010	5,973		—
2020	7,234		21.1%
U.S. Decennial Census

=== Racial and ethnic composition ===
Notre Dame CDP, Indiana – Racial and ethnic composition Note: the US Census treats Hispanic/Latino as an ethnic category. This table excludes Latinos from the racial categories and assigns them to a separate category. Hispanics/Latinos may be of any race.
Race / Ethnicity (NH = Non-Hispanic)	Pop 2010	Pop 2020	% 2010	% 2020
White alone (NH)	4,581	5,312	76.70%	73.43%
Black or African American alone (NH)	152	307	2.54%	4.24%
Native American or Alaska Native alone (NH)	10	27	0.17%	0.37%
Asian alone (NH)	434	568	7.27%	7.85%
Native Hawaiian or Pacific Islander alone (NH)	3	18	0.05%	0.25%
Other race alone (NH)	5	26	0.08%	0.36%
Mixed race or Multiracial (NH)	199	295	3.33%	4.08%
Hispanic or Latino (any race)	589	681	9.86%	9.41%
Total	5,973	7,234	100.00%	100.00%

=== 2020 census ===
As of the 2020 census, Notre Dame had a population of 7,234. The median age was 20.3 years. 0.3% of residents were under the age of 18 and 2.1% of residents were 65 years of age or older. For every 100 females there were 105.6 males, and for every 100 females age 18 and over there were 105.7 males age 18 and over.

100.0% of residents lived in urban areas, while 0.0% lived in rural areas.

There were 181 households in Notre Dame, of which 7.2% had children under the age of 18 living in them. Of all households, 6.6% were married-couple households, 49.7% were households with a male householder and no spouse or partner present, and 42.0% were households with a female householder and no spouse or partner present. About 33.1% of all households were made up of individuals and 5.0% had someone living alone who was 65 years of age or older.

There were 279 housing units, of which 35.1% were vacant. The homeowner vacancy rate was 11.1% and the rental vacancy rate was 3.1%.

== Holy Cross religious communities ==
Holy Cross Village at Notre Dame is a retirement community offering continuing care. It is owned by the Brothers of Holy Cross and managed by the Franciscan Sisters of Chicago Service Corporation.

Notre Dame is the home of three major headquarters of Holy Cross religious communities. On the campus of Saint Mary's College, the Sisters of the Holy Cross have their Congregational Administration. The Holy Cross College campus is the location of the Provincial Offices of two provinces of the Congregation of Holy Cross: the Midwest Province of Brothers and the United States Province of Priests and Brothers. In addition to these, Notre Dame also holds provinces of the Superior Faith, which are the Eastern Province of Sisters and the Notre Dame Province of Holy Cross.

== Government and infrastructure ==
As unincorporated communities do not have a municipal government, Notre Dame's government entities are the United States post office and the colleges' police forces. All colleges and universities in Indiana are entitled to an independent police force by law. The University of Notre Dame also has its own fire department and supplies its own water and power utilities.

The United States Postal Service Notre Dame Post Office is located in the northwest corner of Hammes Mowbray Hall, west of East Gate along Juniper Road on the University of Notre Dame campus. It has been in operation since 1851.

== Education ==
Notre Dame is in the South Bend Community School Corporation (SBCSC). The school zonings are as follows: Darden Elementary School Edison Middle School and Clay High School (for Landings at Notre Dame). Previously, Darden Primary, Tarkington Traditional Elementary, Clay Intermediate, and Clay High served as the local public schools for children of graduate students at University Village. At the end of the 2017–2018 school year, Fischer Graduate Residence became the designated housing for students with dependent children, as University Village closed.
