= Liberty Township, St. Joseph County, Indiana =

Liberty Township
- Township
- Location in St. Joseph County
- Coordinates: 41°31′35″N 86°24′12″W
- Country: United States
- State: Indiana
- County: St. Joseph

Government
  - Type: Indiana township

Area
  - Total: 42.88 sq mi (111.07 km^{2})
  - Land: 42.45 sq mi (109.95 km^{2})
  - Water: 0.43 sq mi (1.12 km^{2}) 1.01%
- Elevation: 745 ft (227 m)

Population (2020)
  - Total: 3,416
  - Density: 72/sq mi (27.8/km^{2})
- Time zone: UTC-5 (Eastern (EST))
  - Summer (DST): UTC-4 (EDT)
- ZIP codes: 46536, 46554, 46574
- Area code: 574
- GNIS feature ID: 453560
- Website: Official website

Liberty Township is one of thirteen townships in St. Joseph County, in the U.S. state of Indiana. As of the 2000 census, its population was 3,053.

== Geography ==
According to the United States Census Bureau, Liberty Township covers an area of 42.88 square miles (111.1 km^{2}); of this, 42.45 square miles (109.9 km^{2}) (98.99 percent) is land and 0.43 square miles (1.1 km^{2}) (1.01 percent) is water.

=== Cities, towns, villages ===
- North Liberty

=== Adjacent townships ===
- Greene Township (northeast)
- Union Township (east)
- North Township, Marshall County (southeast)
- Polk Township, Marshall County (south)
- Lincoln Township (southwest)
- Lincoln Township, LaPorte County (west)

=== Cemeteries ===
The township contains these four cemeteries: Fair, Old, Porter and Westlawn.

=== Major highways ===
- SR 4
- SR 23

=== Lakes ===
- Elizabeth Lake
- Rupel Lake
- Worster Lake

== School districts ==
- John Glenn School Corporation

== Political districts ==
- Indiana's 2nd congressional district
- State House District 21
- State Senate District 9
