= Greene Township, St. Joseph County, Indiana =

Greene Township
- Township
- Location in St. Joseph County
- Coordinates: 41°37′31″N 86°20′00″W
- Country: United States
- State: Indiana
- County: St. Joseph

Government
  - Type: Indiana township

Area
  - Total: 34.57 sq mi (89.54 km^{2})
  - Land: 34.31 sq mi (88.86 km^{2})
  - Water: 0.26 sq mi (0.68 km^{2}) 0.76%
- Elevation: 735 ft (224 m)

Population (2020)
  - Total: 2,909
  - Density: 89/sq mi (34.2/km^{2})
- Time zone: UTC-5 (Eastern (EST))
  - Summer (DST): UTC-4 (EDT)
- ZIP codes: 46554, 46614, 46619
- Area code: 574
- GNIS feature ID: 452852

Greene Township is one of thirteen townships in St. Joseph County, in the U.S. state of Indiana. As of the 2020 census, its population was 2,909.

Greene Township was established in 1836.

== Geography ==
According to the United States Census Bureau, Greene Township covers an area of 34.57 square miles (89.5 km^{2}); of this, 34.31 square miles (88.9 km^{2}) (99.24 percent) is land and 0.26 square miles (0.67 km^{2}) (0.76 percent) is water.

=== Adjacent townships ===
- Warren Township (north)
- Portage Township (northeast)
- Centre Township (east)
- Union Township (southeast)
- Liberty Township (southwest)
- Lincoln Township, LaPorte County (west)
- Olive Township (northwest)

=== Cemeteries ===
The township contains Sumption Prairie Cemetery. There is another township owned cemetery located on Pine road between Layton and Miller roads.

=== Major highways ===
- SR 23

=== Lakes ===
- Catfish Lake
- Dollar Lake
- Goodman Lake
- Kale Lake
- Sousley Lake

== School districts ==
- South Bend Community School Corporation
  - Wilson Elementary School
  - Residents are divided between Jackson Middle School and Navarro Middle School.
  - Most areas are zoned to Washington High School while some are zoned to Riley High School.

Prior to 1930, there were several one room schoolhouses, numbering eight. On March 3, 1930, they consolidated into the Greene Township School. The original section became the western wing, as a grade 1-12 school. It had an enrollment exceeding 600 in the 1950s. It ended high school classes due to a lower number of students. By 2018 it became known as the Greene Intermediate Center and was operated by the South Bend school district. In 2018, when it closed, its enrollment was 181, with some of the students living in South Bend, and it was the district's final school in the township. At one point Hay Elementary School took a small portion of the township, but it closed in 2021.

In 2018 residents of Greene Township began plans to join the John Glenn School Corporation and leave the South Bend corporation, partly because they had a negative view of the South Bend district and partly because the Greene Intermediate Center, the district's final school in the township, closed in 2018, with the parents anticipating a reopening under new management. At first the South Bend district did not approve of the plan, but in 2022 began talks on how to let Greene Township move to John Glenn.

== Political districts ==
- Indiana's 2nd congressional district
- State House District 7
- State Senate District 9
