= German Township, St. Joseph County, Indiana =

German Township
- Township
- Location in St. Joseph County
- Coordinates: 41°43′51″N 86°19′01″W
- Country: United States
- State: Indiana
- County: St. Joseph

Government
  - Type: Indiana township

Area
  - Total: 16.96 sq mi (43.92 km^{2})
  - Land: 16.88 sq mi (43.73 km^{2})
  - Water: 0.073 sq mi (0.19 km^{2}) 0.43%
- Elevation: 794 ft (242 m)

Population (2020)
  - Total: 10,001
  - Density: 505/sq mi (194.8/km^{2})
- Time zone: UTC-5 (Eastern (EST))
  - Summer (DST): UTC-4 (EDT)
- ZIP code: 46628
- Area code: 574
- GNIS feature ID: 453327
- Website: germantownshipsb.com

German Township is one of thirteen townships in St. Joseph County, in the U.S. state of Indiana. As of the 2000 census, its population was 8,518.

== History ==
The Wertz-Bestle Farm was listed on the National Register of Historic Places in 2001.

== Geography ==
According to the United States Census Bureau, German Township covers an area of 16.96 square miles (43.9 km^{2}); of this, 16.89 square miles (43.7 km^{2}) (99.57 percent) is land and 0.07 square miles (0.18 km^{2}) (0.43 percent) is water.

=== Cities, towns, villages ===
- South Bend (partial)

=== Adjacent townships ===
- Niles Township, Berrien County, Michigan (north)
- Clay Township (east)
- Portage Township (southeast)
- Warren Township (southwest)
- Bertrand Township, Berrien County, Michigan (northwest)

=== Cemeteries ===
The township contains Highland Cemetery.

=== Major highways ===
- Indiana Toll Road
- I-80
- I-90
- US 20
- US 31

=== Airports and landing strips ===
- McClures Airport
- South Bend International Airport (fmr. Michiana Regional Airport, vast majority)

== School districts ==
- South Bend Community School Corporation

== Political districts ==
- Indiana's 2nd congressional district
- State House District 7
- State House District 8
- State Senate District 10
- State Senate District 11
- State Senate District 8
