= LaVille Community Schools =

School district in Indiana

LaVille Community Schools, formally known as Union-North United School Corporation, comprises Union Township, including the town of Lakeville in St. Joseph County, Indiana, and North Township, including the town of La Paz in Marshall County, Indiana. The school corporation was organized July 1, 1962, and is governed by a five-member elected Board of School Trustees. LaVille Elementary School houses grades K–6 and Laville Junior-Senior High School comprises grades 7–12. The school community is located approximately fifteen miles south of South Bend, Indiana, and approximately eight miles north of Plymouth, Indiana. The school district also includes the Lancer Virtual School, an online accredited school.

On June 8, 2026, the Board of School Trustees voted 4–0 to officially change the name from Union-North United School Coorporation to LaVille Community Schools.
