= Madison Township, St. Joseph County, Indiana =

Madison Township
- Township
- Location in St. Joseph County
- Coordinates: 41°31′55″N 86°07′25″W
- Country: United States
- State: Indiana
- County: St. Joseph

Government
  - Type: Indiana township
  - Trustee: Scott Laidig

Area
  - Total: 52 sq mi (135 km^{2})
  - Land: 52.11 sq mi (134.97 km^{2})
  - Water: 0.012 sq mi (0.03 km^{2}) 0.02%
- Elevation: 830 ft (253 m)

Population (2020)
  - Total: 1,795
  - Density: 34.44/sq mi (13.30/km^{2})
- Time zone: UTC-5 (Eastern (EST))
  - Summer (DST): UTC-4 (EDT)
- ZIP codes: 46506, 46544, 46550, 46573, 46595, 46614
- Area code: 574
- GNIS feature ID: 453598

Madison Township is one of thirteen townships in St. Joseph County, in the U.S. state of Indiana. As of the 2020 census, its population was 1,795.

== Geography ==
According to the United States Census Bureau, Madison Township covers an area of 52.12 square miles (135.0 km^{2}); of this, 52.11 square miles (135.0 km^{2}) (99.98 percent) is land and 0.01 square miles (0.026 km^{2}) (0.02 percent) is water.

=== Unincorporated towns ===
- Woodland at 41.564493°N 86.177226°W
- Wyatt at 41.525881°N 86.169448°W

(This list is based on USGS data and may include former settlements.)

=== Adjacent townships ===
- Penn Township (north)
- Olive Township, Elkhart County (east)
- Locke Township, Elkhart County (southeast)
- German Township, Marshall County (south)
- Union Township (west)
- Centre Township (northwest)

=== Major highways ===
- SR 331

== School districts ==
- Penn-Harris-Madison School Corporation

== Political districts ==
- Indiana's 2nd congressional district
- State House District 21
- State Senate District 9
