= Virginia Tutt =

Virginia M. Tutt
- Born: South Bend, Indiana
- Died: May 30, 1927; South Bend, Indiana
- Occupation: Librarian
- Known for: Head Librarian of the first St Joseph County Public Library branch

Virginia M. Tutt (died 1927) was the head librarian of the first St. Joseph County Public Library branch. She was born in South Bend, Indiana. After working in a New York library for a couple years, Tutt returned to South Bend and became one of two public librarians in the South Bend Public Library. She served as head librarian from 1903 to 1927 and increased the collection by 80,000 books. In 1918, Tutt opened the first branch. She died in South Bend on May 30, 1927. A library branch of the St. Joseph County Public Library has been named after her.
