= Portage Township, St. Joseph County, Indiana =

Portage Township
- Township
- Seal
- Motto: "Here for you in your time of need."
- Location in St. Joseph County
- Coordinates: 41°40′09″N 86°16′33″W
- Country: United States
- State: Indiana
- County: St. Joseph

Government
  - Type: Indiana township
  - Trustee: Jason Critchlow
  - Deputy Trustee: Lana Cleary

Area
  - Total: 34.80 sq mi (90.14 km^{2})
  - Land: 34.36 sq mi (88.98 km^{2})
  - Water: 0.44 sq mi (1.15 km^{2}) 1.28%
- Elevation: 715 ft (218 m)

Population (2020)
  - Total: 94,571
  - Density: 2,753/sq mi (1,063/km^{2})
- Time zone: UTC-5 (Eastern (EST))
  - Summer (DST): UTC-4 (EDT)
- ZIP codes: 46556, 46601, 46613, 46614, 46615, 46616, 46617, 46619, 46628, 46629
- Area code: 574
- GNIS feature ID: 453759
- Website: portage-township.com

Portage Township is one of thirteen townships in St. Joseph County, in the U.S. state of Indiana. As of the 2020 census, its population was 94,571.

== Geography ==
According to the United States Census Bureau, Portage Township covers an area of 34.8 square miles (90 km^{2}); of this, 34.36 square miles (89.0 km^{2}) (98.71 percent) is land and 0.45 square miles (1.2 km^{2}) (1.28 percent) is water.

=== Cities, towns, villages ===
- South Bend (partial)

=== Census Designated Places ===
- Notre Dame (partial)

=== Unincorporated towns ===
- Ardmore at 41.689214°N 86.3175095°W

(This list is based on USGS data and may include former settlements.)

=== Adjacent townships ===
- Clay Township (northeast)
- Penn Township (east)
- Centre Township (south)
- Greene Township (southwest)
- Warren Township (west)
- German Township (northwest)

=== Cemeteries ===
The township contains these five cemeteries: Bowman, Cedar Grove, Hungarian Sacred Heart, Riverview and Saint Josephs.

=== Major highways ===
- Indiana Toll Road
- I-80
- I-90
- US 20
- US 31
- SR 2
- SR 23
- SR 933

=== Airports and landing strips ===
- Esther Landing Pad Airport
- South Bend Regional Airport (partial)

=== Lakes ===
- Pinhook Lake
- St. Joseph Lake
- St. Mary's Lake

=== Landmarks ===
- Holy Cross College (Indiana) https://www.hcc-nd.edu/
- Saint Mary's College (south three-quarters) https://www.saintmarys.edu/
- University of Notre Dame (partial) https://www.nd.edu/
- Indiana University South Bend https://www.iusb.edu/
- Ivy Tech Community College South Bend https://www.ivytech.edu/southbendelkhart/index.html

== School districts ==
- South Bend Community School Corporation

== Political districts ==
- Indiana's 2nd congressional district
- State House District 6
- State House District 7
- State House District 8
- State Senate District 10
- State Senate District 11
- State Senate District 8
- State Senate District 9
