= Crumstown, Indiana =

- Unincorporated community
- Location within Indiana Location within the United States
- Coordinates: 41°37′29″N 86°24′32″W
- Country: United States
- State: Indiana
- Counties: LaPorte, St. Joseph
- Township: Warren
- Founder: Nathaniel Crum Christian Holler
- Elevation: 709 ft (216 m)
- Time zone: UTC-5 (Eastern (EST))
  - Summer (DST): UTC-4 (EDT)
- ZIP code: 46554
- Area code: 574
- FIPS code: 18-16210
- GNIS feature ID: 452578

Crumstown is an unincorporated community in LaPorte and St. Joseph counties, in the U.S. state of Indiana.

== History ==
Christian Holler laid out the original plat of the town of Crum's Point (Crumstown) on April 21, 1875, on the line of the Grand Trunk Railroad. The community was named after Nathaniel H. Crum, an early settler. Christian Holler platted an addition to the town on January 20, 1882, in Warren Township near the junction of the Grapevine Creek and the Kankakee River. The population in 1900 was one hundred.

A post office was established at Crumstown in 1875, and remained in operation until it was discontinued in 1918.
