= Lakeville High School (Lakeville, Indiana) =

- U.S. National Register of Historic Places
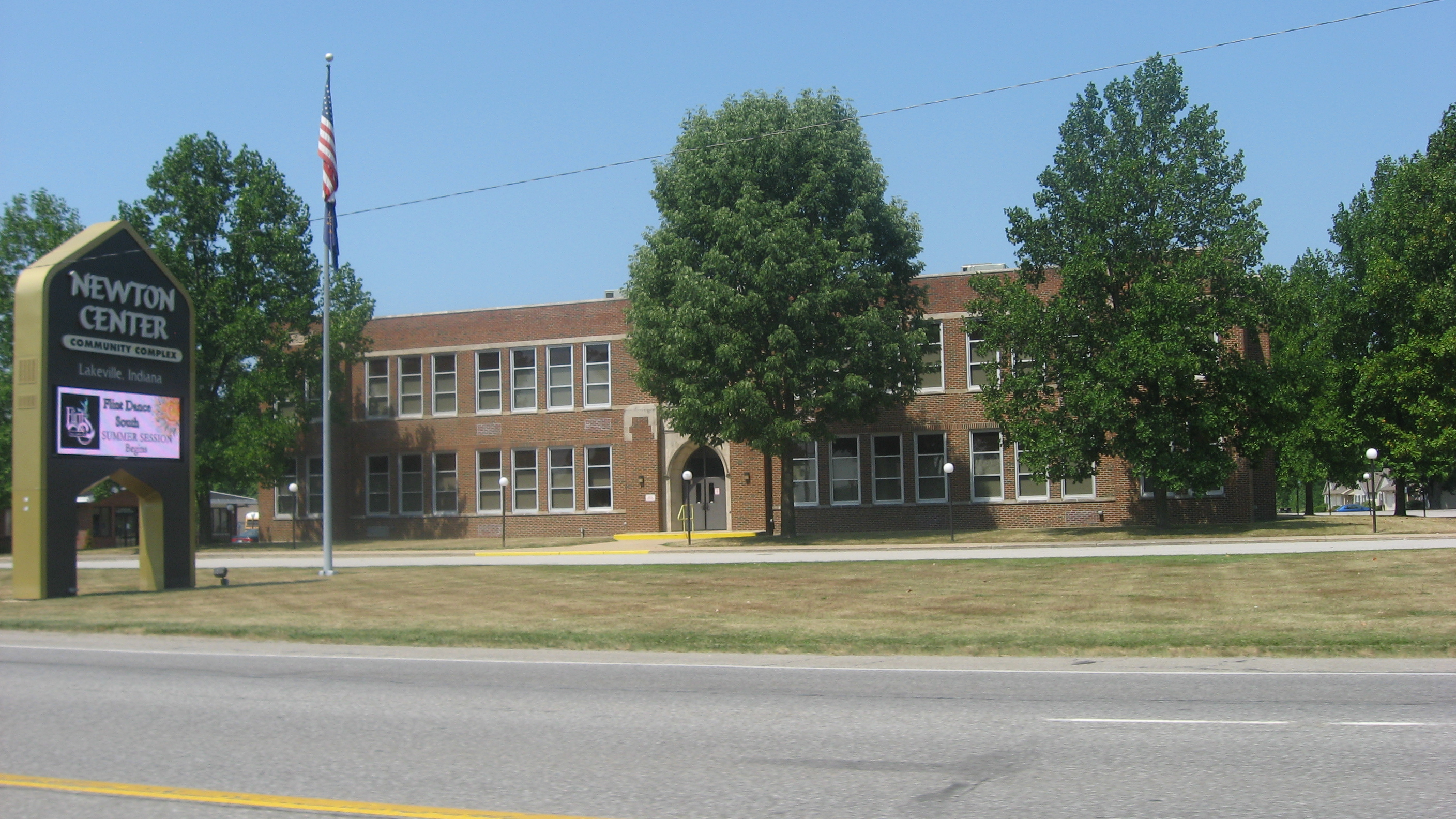
- Former Lakeville High School, July 2012

- Location within Indiana
- Location: 601 N. Michigan St., Lakeville, Indiana
- Coordinates: 41°31′52″N 86°16′25″W
- Area: less than one acre
- Built: 1931
- Architect: Miller, Hubert
- Architectural style: Late Gothic Revival
- NRHP reference No.: 91001166
- Added to NRHP: August 29, 1991

Lakeville High School is a historic high school building located at Lakeville, Indiana. It was built in 1931, and is a two-story, "T"-plan, Collegiate Gothic style brick building. It sits on a concrete foundation and has a flat roof with brick and stone parapet wall. The front facade consists of a central tower flanked by two long wings ending in towers of similar proportion. The school closed in 1983, and now houses a community center.

It was listed on the National Register of Historic Places in 1991.
