= Harris Township, St. Joseph County, Indiana =

Harris Township
- Township
- Logo

- Location in St. Joseph County
- Coordinates: 41°44′05″N 86°07′28″W
- Country: United States
- State: Indiana
- County: St. Joseph
- Organized: 1836

Government
  - Type: Indiana township
  - Trustee: Ken Lindsay

Area
  - Total: 21.12 sq mi (54.69 km^{2})
  - Land: 21.12 sq mi (54.69 km^{2})
  - Water: 0 sq mi (0.00 km^{2})
- Elevation: 774 ft (236 m)

Population (2020)
  - Total: 24,397
  - Density: 1,155/sq mi (446.1/km^{2})
- Time zone: UTC-5 (Eastern (EST))
  - Summer (DST): UTC-4 (EDT)
- ZIP codes: 46530, 46545, 46561
- Area code: 574
- GNIS feature ID: 453376
- Website: harristwp.com

Harris Township is one of thirteen townships in St. Joseph County, in the U.S. state of Indiana. As of the 2000 census, its population was 19,873.

Harris Township was organized in 1836. The township was named after the Harris family, a local family of pioneer settlers.

== Geography ==
According to the United States Census Bureau, Harris Township covers an area of 21.12 square miles (54.7 km^{2}), all land.

=== Cities, towns, villages ===
- Mishawaka (partial)

=== CDPs ===
- Granger (partial)

=== Cemeteries ===
The township contains Harris Prairie Cemetery on Adams Road, and Salem Cemetery near Ash and Brummitt Roads.

=== Major highways ===
- Interstate 80
- Interstate 90
- Indiana State Road 23

=== Airports and landing strips ===
- Cam-Air Airport
- Foos Field

== Education ==
- Penn-Harris-Madison School Corporation

Harris Township residents may obtain a free library card from any branch of the Mishawaka-Penn-Harris Public Library system.

== Political districts ==
- Indiana's 2nd congressional district
- State House District 48
- State House District 8
- State Senate District 11
