= NorthWood High School =

Northwood High School

Location
- 2101 North Main Street; Nappanee, Elkhart County, Indiana 46550; United States; 41.461352°N 85.999326°W

Information
- Type: Public high school
- Superintendent: Scot Croner
- Principal: Weston Lambert
- Teaching staff: 58.00 (FTE)
- Grades: 9 to 12
- Enrollment: 875 (2023–2024)
- Student to teacher ratio: 15.09
- Colors: Red and black
- Team name: Panthers
- Website: Official website

NorthWood High School is a high school located in Nappanee, Indiana, United States. It is a part of the Wa-Nee Community School System, shared with Wakarusa.

== Demographics ==
In the 2023–24 school year, total enrollment was 917 students.

In the 2023–24 school year the ethnicity breakdown was:

- White – 82.7%
- Hispanic – 10.1%
- Black – 2.5%
- Asian – 0.8%
- Multi-racial – 3.8%
- Pacific Islander – 0.1%

== Athletics ==
NorthWood High School's mascot is the panther, and its colors are red and black. The school competes in the Northern Lakes Conference along with Concord, Goshen, Mishawaka, Northridge, Plymouth, Warsaw and Wawasee.

NorthWood's football team was state champion in 2005. The football team was state runner-up in 2023.

NorthWood's girls' basketball team were state champions in 1999 and 2020, with 2020 being the lowest scoring girls' basketball state championship in Indiana, with 66 combined points (the games score being the score of both teams added together).

NorthWood's boys' basketball team won the state champion title in 2023 for the first time in its program's history.

== See also ==
- List of high schools in Indiana
