= Wawasee High School =

Location
- 1 Warrior Path; Syracuse, Indiana 46567; United States; 41°25′05″N 85°45′23″W

Information
- Type: Public
- Established: 1968; 58 years ago
- School district: Wawasee Community School Corporation
- Principal: Geoff Walmer
- Teaching staff: 66.75 (FTE basis)
- Grades: 9-12
- Enrollment: 901 (2023–24)
- Student to teacher ratio: 13.50
- Colors: Green and gold
- Athletics conference: Northern Lakes
- Nickname: Warriors
- Website: whs.wawaseeschools.org

Wawasee High School is a high school located in Syracuse, Indiana, United States.

== History ==
Wawasee High School was founded in 1968 after merging the high schools from Syracuse, Milford, and North Webster. Wawasee High School (and the Wawasee School Corporation) was named after Chief Wawasee of the Miami tribe, who was given tracts of land in what is now Syracuse.

== Demographics ==
The demographic breakdown of the 935 students enrolled for 2013-14 was:

- Male - 52.5%
- Female - 47.5%
- Native American/Alaskan - 0.4%
- Asian/Pacific islanders - 0.5%
- Black - 0.8%
- Hispanic - 9.5%
- White - 85.8%
- Multiracial - 3.0%

35.9% of the students were eligible for free or reduced lunch.

== Athletics ==
Wawasee High School's mascot is the "Warrior," and their colors are green and gold. Wawasee competes in the Northern Lakes Conference along with Concord, Mishawaka, Goshen, Northridge, NorthWood, Plymouth, and Warsaw. Girls' track took the state championship in 1976. Principal Kim Nguyen opted to fund a new football field in 2017.

== Music ==
Wawasee has a marching band, concert band, drumline, and jazz band. Wawasee also has a concert choir and an orchestra. Wawasee competes in ISSMA contests in marching band, concert band, choir and orchestra. The marching band is known as the Wawasee High School Marching Warrior Pride.

== Notable alumni ==
- Brent McMillan - National political director for the Green Party
- Shanna Zolman - Former WNBA player for the San Antonio Silver Stars and Tulsa Shock

== See also ==
- List of high schools in Indiana
