= List of Indiana state historical markers in St. Joseph County =

Location of St. Joseph County in Indiana

This is a list of the Indiana state historical markers in St. Joseph County.

This is intended to be a complete list of the official state historical markers placed in St. Joseph County, Indiana, United States by the Indiana Historical Bureau. The locations of the historical markers and their latitude and longitude coordinates are included below when available, along with their names, years of placement, and topics as recorded by the Historical Bureau. There are 23 historical markers located in St. Joseph County.

== Historical markers ==
Marker title	Image	Year placed	Location	Topics
La Salle's Camp 1 Mile West		?	Junction of the Dixie Highway (State Road 933) and Darden Road near South Bend; 41°43′48.8″N 86°15′1.4″W	Early Settlement and Exploration
Camp Rose		1963	Junction of Leland and Portage Avenues in South Bend; 41°41′4″N 86°15′29.7″W	Military
Sisters of the Holy Cross, Civil War Nurses, 1861-1865		1965	Junction of E. Madison Street and N. Notre Dame Avenue in South Bend; 41°40′49.4″N 86°14′19″W	Women, Military, Religion
Indiana Territorial Line (east–west boundary at this point)		1966	Junction of U.S. Route 31 and Johnson Road on the southern edge of South Bend; 41°37′1″N 86°15′7″W	Early Settlement and Exploration, Government Institutions
Site of Home of Schuyler Colfax March 23, 1823-January 1, 1885		1966	Junction of Colfax and Taylor Streets in South Bend; 41°40′40″N 86°15′28.5″W	Politics, Newspapers and Media
First Dam Across the St. Joseph River/Power Race		1968	Junction of Race and First Streets in Mishawaka; 41°39′46″N 86°10′42″W	Business, Industry, and Labor
First Bridge		1968	300 block of N. Main Street at the St. Joseph River in Mishawaka; 41°39′50″N 86°10′52″W	Transportation, Buildings and Architecture
The Mishawaka Academic and Normal Institute 1846-1868		1968	303 S. Main at 4th Street in Mishawaka; 41°39′32″N 86°10′50.7″W	Education
St. Joseph Iron Works		1968	300 block of N. Main Street in Mishawaka; 41°39′46″N 86°10′49.6″W	Business, Industry, and Labor
Mishawaka High School		1976	Mishawaka High School at 1202 Lincoln Way E. in Mishawaka; 41°39′45″N 86°9′39″W	Education
Kamm & Schellinger Brewery		1995	100 Center Street Complex at Lincoln Way on the southern bank of the St. Joseph River in Mishawaka; 41°39′45″N 86°11′22″W	Business, Industry, and Labor
Normain Heights Subdivision		1997	Lawn of the fire station at 2332 N. Main Street in Mishawaka; 41°40′53.6″N 86°10′52.4″W	Military, Historic District, Neighborhoods, and Towns
Battell Park		1997	400 W. Mishawaka Avenue at the Charlotte Avenue junction in Mishawaka; 41°39′58″N 86°11′16″W	Nature and Natural Disasters, Buildings and Architecture
Huggart Settlement		1998	Northwestern corner of the junction of State Road 4 and Mulberry Road east of Potato Creek State Park in Union Township; 41°32′7″N 86°18′44″W	African American
Dodge Manufacturing Company		1999	500 S. Union Street at the parking lot and entrance to the RMG foundry of the Troyer Group in Mishawaka; 41°39′23.2″N 86°10′37″W	Business, Industry, and Labor
Jewish Cemetery Site		2002	Western side of the 500 block of N. Niles Avenue in South Bend; 41°40′57.4″N 86°14′40.6″W	Cemetery, Immigration and Ethnic Groups
Porter (Rea) Cemetery		2003	Cemetery located in Potato Creek State Park near North Liberty; 41°32′56″N 86°21′10″W	Cemetery, African American
Lincoln & Dixie Highways		2010	South Bend; 41°40′34.5″N 86°15′1.6″W	Cemetery, African American
Kenneth Rexroth		2017	828 Park Avenue in South Bend; 41°41′10″N 86°15′22″W	Arts & Culture
Better Homes of South Bend		2017	Corner of N. Elmer St. and Keller St., near 1702 N. Elmer St., South Bend; 41°41′51.2″N 86°16′57.3″W	African American, Historic District
Indiana University South Bend		2020	Near 1700 Mishawaka Ave., South Bend; 41°39′56.3″N 86°13′16.3″W	Education & Library
J Chester and Elizabeth Allen		2020	115 S. Lafayette Blvd., South Bend; 41°40′32.7″N 86°15′13.2″W	African American, Law & Court Case, Women
South Bend Blue Sox		2021	River Crossing Student Housing, Ironwood Drive, Indiana University South Bend, South Bend; 41°39′36.6″N 86°12′56.5″W	Sports, Women

== See also ==
- List of Indiana state historical markers
- National Register of Historic Places listings in St. Joseph County, Indiana
