= Northern Lakes Conference =

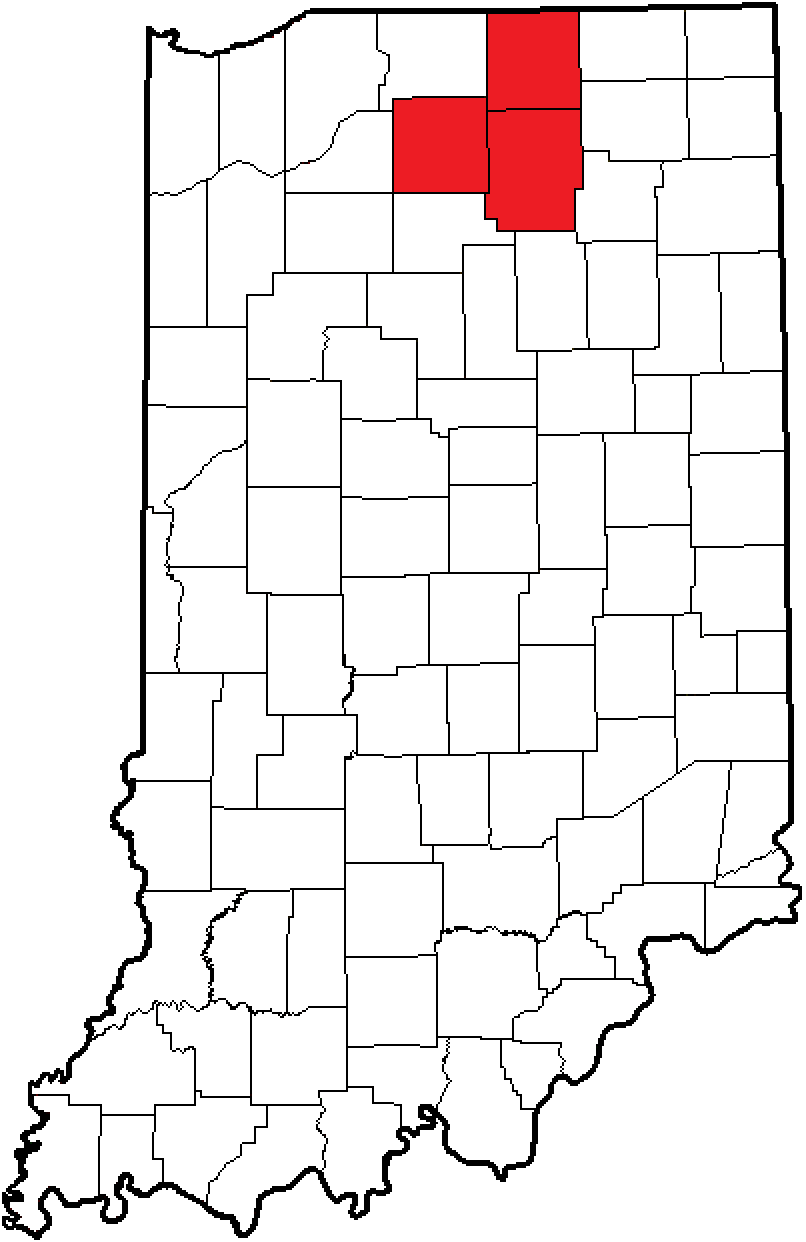
The Northern Lakes Conference within Indiana

The Northern Lakes Conference of Indiana (NLC) is an IHSAA-sanctioned athletic conference of high schools located within Elkhart, Kosciusko, Marshall and St. Joseph counties in northern Indiana, United States.

== History ==
To deal with the reorganization and consolidation of high schools across northern Indiana, an organizational meeting for the formation of the Northern Lakes Conference was held on February 3, 1963. Charter members of the NLC included the high schools of Bremen, Manchester, Nappanee, Plymouth, Rochester and Warsaw. The conference began competition in 1964–65 in Boys' Baseball, Football, Basketball and Track. In 1965, Boys' Tennis and Golf were added; Cross-Country was added in 1966; and Wrestling became a conference sport in 1968. The conference was "intended to provide good, clean competition and fellowship for the boys, the coaches, and the school bodies of the Northern Lakes region."

Concord High School joined the NLC in 1967 and Wawasee High School joined in 1968. By 1970, all schools participated in all eight boys' sports.

In the 1970s Girls' sports were added. Conference competition began in 1976–77 in Basketball, Tennis, Track and Volleyball. In 1980 Swimming was added; Cross-Country was added in 1986, Softball in 1987; Golf in 1994; and Soccer in 1997.

Additional sports added to NLC Boys' competition included Swimming in 1980 and Soccer in 1994.

Membership in the Northern Lakes Conference has fluctuated between six and eight schools throughout conference history. In 1976, Manchester changed conferences. In 1987 and 1989, Rochester and Bremen withdrew memberships to begin competition with schools of lesser size and less travel than those of the NLC membership. Additions to the Northern Lakes Conference were Goshen in 1976 and Northridge in 1987. Elkhart Memorial began competition in winter sports in 2000 and all other sports in 2001–02.

On March 7, 2018, the Northern Lakes Conference announced that Elkhart Memorial High School will cease to be a member of the conference at the conclusion of the 2019- 2020 school year. In the fall of 2020, Elkhart Memorial and Elkhart Central high schools consolidated into a single Elkhart High School. The new school will retain Elkhart Central's position in the Northern Indiana Conference.

The conference announced it would accept applications for membership through May 15, 2018. The NLC announced in July 2018 that Mishawaka High School will join for the 2020–21 school year after leaving the NIC.

=== Basketball ===
The NLC has a rich basketball history, producing NBA stars like Scott Skiles, Rick Fox, and Shawn Kemp. On February 11, 2017, the Warsaw Tigers made league history by becoming the first team to win the conference in three consecutive years while going undefeated (21–0) during that span.

== Membership ==
School	Location	County	Team name	Colors	Enrollment 24–25	IHSAA Class	Year joined	Previous conference
Concord	Elkhart	20; Elkhart	Minutemen		1,730	5A	1967	Elkhart County
Goshen	Goshen	20; Elkhart	RedHawks^{2}		2,006	5A	1976	Independents (NIC 1969)
Mishawaka	Mishawaka	71; St. Joseph	Cavemen		1,422	4A	2020	Northern Indiana
Northridge	Middlebury	20; Elkhart	Raiders		1,393	4A	1987	Independents (new school 1969)
NorthWood	Nappanee	20; Elkhart	Panthers		869	4A	1969	none (new school)
Plymouth	Plymouth	50; Marshall	Rockies / Pilgrims		1,054	4A	1963	Central Indiana
Warsaw	Warsaw	43; Kosciusko	Tigers		2,108	5A	1963	Central Indiana
Wawasee	Syracuse	43; Kosciusko	Warriors		895	4A	1968	none (new school)

1. Mascot was Redskins until 2016.

== Former members ==
School	Location	Mascot	Colors	County	Years Joined	Previous conference	Year left	Conference joined
Bremen^{1}	Bremen	Lions		50; Marshall	1963	Marshall County	1989	Northern State
Manchester	North Manchester	Squires		85; Wabash	1963	Independents (WCC 1962)	1976	Three Rivers
Nappanee	Nappanee	Bulldogs		20; Elkhart	1963	Elkhart County	1969	none (consolidated into NorthWood)
Rochester	Rochester	Zebras		25; Fulton	1963	Central Indiana	1987	Three Rivers Conference
Elkhart; Memorial^{2}	Elkhart	Crimson Chargers		20; Elkhart	1999	Northern Indiana	2020	Consolidated into Elkhart (NIC)

1. Played concurrently in NLC and MCC 1963–66.
2. Elkhart Memorial played in both the NIC and NLC from 1999 to 2001.

== Conference championships ==
=== Football ===
#	Team	Seasons
16	Plymouth	1966, 1968, 1971, 1972, 1973*, 1975, 1976, 1977, 1978*, 2005, 2007*, 2008, 2009, 2012*, 2014, 2019*
15	NorthWood	1974, 1980*, 1984*, 1985*, 1991*, 1992*, 1993, 1994, 1995, 1996, 1999*, 2004*, 2007*, 2016, 2022
15	Concord	1979, 1983, 1984*, 1991*, 2004*, 2006, 2007* 2010, 2011, 2012*, 2013, 2015, 2019*, 2021, 2024
10	Warsaw	1964, 1967, 1973*, 1982, 1990, 1992*, 1999*, 2000, 2001, 2020*, 2023*
9	Goshen	1978*, 1980*, 1981*, 1987, 1988, 1989, 1992*, 1997, 1998, 2002
3	Wawasee	1973*, 1986, 2004*
3	Mishawaka	2020*, 2023*, 2025
2	Bremen	1965, 1970
1	Northridge	2017
1	Elkhart Memorial	2003
1	Rochester	1969
0	Manchester	
0	Nappanee	

=== Boys basketball ===
#	Team	Seasons
26	Warsaw	1965, 1966*, 1967, 1969, 1972*, 1976, 1979*, 1980, 1984, 1985, 1986, 1989, 1991, 1992, 1994, 1995, 1996*, 1997*, 1999, 2004, 2010, 2011, 2015, 2016, 2017, 2018* 2019, 2021
17	Plymouth	1968*, 1970, 1973, 1977, 1978, 1981, 1982, 1983*, 1987, 1988, 1990, 1996*, 1997*, 1998*, 2001, 2007*, 2008
6	NorthWood	1972*, 1998*, 2000, 2007*, 2022, 2023
5	Rochester	1966*, 1971, 1974, 1975, 1979*
5	Northridge	1996*, 2009, 2014, 2018* 2020, 2024*
3	Elkhart Memorial	2002, 2006, 2012
3	Concord	2005, 2013, 2024*
2	Wawassee	1983*, 1993
1	Goshen	2003
1	Mishawaka	2024*
1	Manchester	1968*
0	Bremen	

=== Girls basketball ===
#	Team	Seasons
16	Warsaw	1984, 1987*, 1988, 1989, 1990, 1991, 1993, 1999, 2002, 2003, 2004, 2005, 2010, 2013, 2022, 2023, 2024
9	Northridge	1997, 1998, 2006, 2007, 2014, 2016, 2017, 2018, 2019*
6	Plymouth	1992, 1994, 2000, 2001, 2009*, 2019*
5	Goshen	1980, 1981, 1982, 1987*, 2021
4	Elkhart Memorial	2008, 2009*, 2011, 2012
3	NorthWood	1977, 2015, 2020
3	Wawasee	1995, 1996, 2009*
2	Concord	1983, 1985
2	Rochester	1978, 1979
1	Bremen	1986

== State championships ==
=== Concord (3) ===
- 1964 Boys Gymnastics
- 1965 Boys Gymnastics
- 1966 Boys Gymnastics

=== Elkhart Memorial (0) ===
2018 Unified Track And Field

=== Goshen (3) ===
- 1978 Football (2A)
- 1988 Football (4A)
- 2014 Soccer (2A)

=== Northridge (2) ===
- 1988 Softball
- 2004 Boys Cross Country

=== NorthWood (4) ===
- 1999 Girls Basketball (3A)
- 2005 Football (3A)
- 2020 Girls Basketball (3A)
- 2023 Boys Basketball (3A)

=== Plymouth (4) ===
- 1977 Football (2A)
- 1982 Boys Basketball
- 2007 Boys Basketball (3A)
- 2008 Girls Basketball (3A)

=== Warsaw (5) ===
- 1976 Girls Basketball
- 1978 Girls Basketball
- 1984 Boys Basketball
- 1991 Softball
- 2005 Boys Golf

=== Wawasee (1) ===
- 1976 Girls Track & Field
