= Tom Roggeman =

American football player (1931–2018)

Personal information
- Born: September 5, 1931; Mishawaka, Indiana
- Died: August 17, 2018 (aged 86); Chandler, Arizona
- Listed height: 6 ft 0 in (1.83 m)
- Listed weight: 235 lb (107 kg)

Career information
- Position: Guard (No. 67)
- High school: Mishawaka (Mishawaka, Indiana)
- College: Purdue (1949–1952)
- NFL draft: 1953: undrafted

Career history

Playing
- Chicago Bears (1955–1957)

Coaching
- South Bend Washington HS (IN) (1958) Assistant coach; South Bend Washington HS (IN) (1959–1969) Head coach; Purdue (1970–1976) Defensive line; Arizona (1977–1979) Defensive line; Arizona (1982–1986) Linebackers; USC (1987–1992) Linebackers; Cincinnati (1993) Defensive coordinator

Awards and highlights
- Indiana State Champion (1969)

Career NFL statistics
- Games played: 24
- Games started: 1
- Fumble recoveries: 1
- Stats at Pro Football Reference

Head coaching record
- Regular season: 77–18–7 (.789) (high school)
- Career: 77–18–7 (.789) (high school)

Thomas John Roggeman (September 5, 1931 – August 17, 2018) was an American football guard. He played for the Chicago Bears from 1956 to 1957.

Roggeman played at Mishawaka High School for the varsity football team from 1946 to 1948. After graduating from high school he was accepted into Purdue University, where he earned a bachelor's degree in physical education and later masters in the same subject. After graduating from Purdue, he enlisted into the United States Marine Corps to fight in the Korean War. He would later go on to receive the rank of first lieutenant. While a Marine, Roggeman played for the football team in Quantico, VA. After completing his military service he joined the Chicago Bears in 1955 and played until 1957. After his time in the NFL ended he went on to coach the Washington High School as an assistant coach 1958. He would go on to marry Florence Junstine Kurpiewski. At Washington, Roggeman would go to on to have several undefeated seasons and won the Indiana State Championship. After leaving South Bend Washington, he would become a coach, for the freshman and junior varsity teams, at Purdue University from 1970 to 1977. He died on August 17, 2018, in Chandler, Arizona, at age 86.
