= Cass House =

Cass House may refer to:

- Cass House (Denver, Colorado), a Denver Landmark
- Merrifield-Cass House, Mishawaka, Indiana, listed on the National Register of Historic Places (NRHP)
- The Crimson Beech, Staten Island, New York, a Frank Lloyd Wright-designed house also known as "Cass House"
- Dr. Nathan and Lula Cass House, Cameron, Texas, NRHP-listed
