= List of 1959–60 NBA season transactions =

These are the list of personnel changes in the NBA from the 1959–60 NBA season.

== Trade ==
August 22	To Cincinnati Royals: Withey Bell; Win Wilfong; Tom Hemans	To St. Louis Hawks: Johnny McCarthy
January 24	To Minneapolis Lakers: Ray Felix; Draft rights to Ben Warley 1960 NBA draft 4th pick	To New York Knicks: Dick Garmaker; Draft rights to Dave Budd 1960 draft 2nd round pick
January 31	To Cincinnati Royals: Dave Gambee; Hub Reed	To St. Louis Hawks: Dave Piontek
February 1	To Minneapolis Lakers: Willie Merriweather; Chuck Share; Nick Mantis	To St. Louis Hawks: Larry Foust
April 16	To Detroit Pistons: Bob Ferry	To St. Louis Hawks: Ed Conlin

== Free Agency ==
Player	Date signed	New team	Former team
Frank Selvy	October 28	Syracuse Nationals	New York Knicks
Whitey Bell	January 11	New York Knicks	Cincinnati Royals

== Selling ==
Player	Date signed	New team	Former team
Barney Cable	November 10	Syracuse Nationals	Detroit Pistons
Ron Sobie	December 1	Syracuse Nationals	Minneapolis Lakers
Frank Selvy	December 15	Minneapolis Lakers	Syracuse Nationals
Dave Gambee	April 15	St. Louis Hawks	Cincinnati Royals
Don Ohl	April 16	Detroit Pistons	Philadelphia 76ers

== Waived ==
Player	Date waived	Former team
Frank Selvy	October 25	New York Knicks
Jack George	January 11	New York Knicks
