= Eller-Hosford House =

Historic house in Indiana, United States

- U.S. National Register of Historic Places
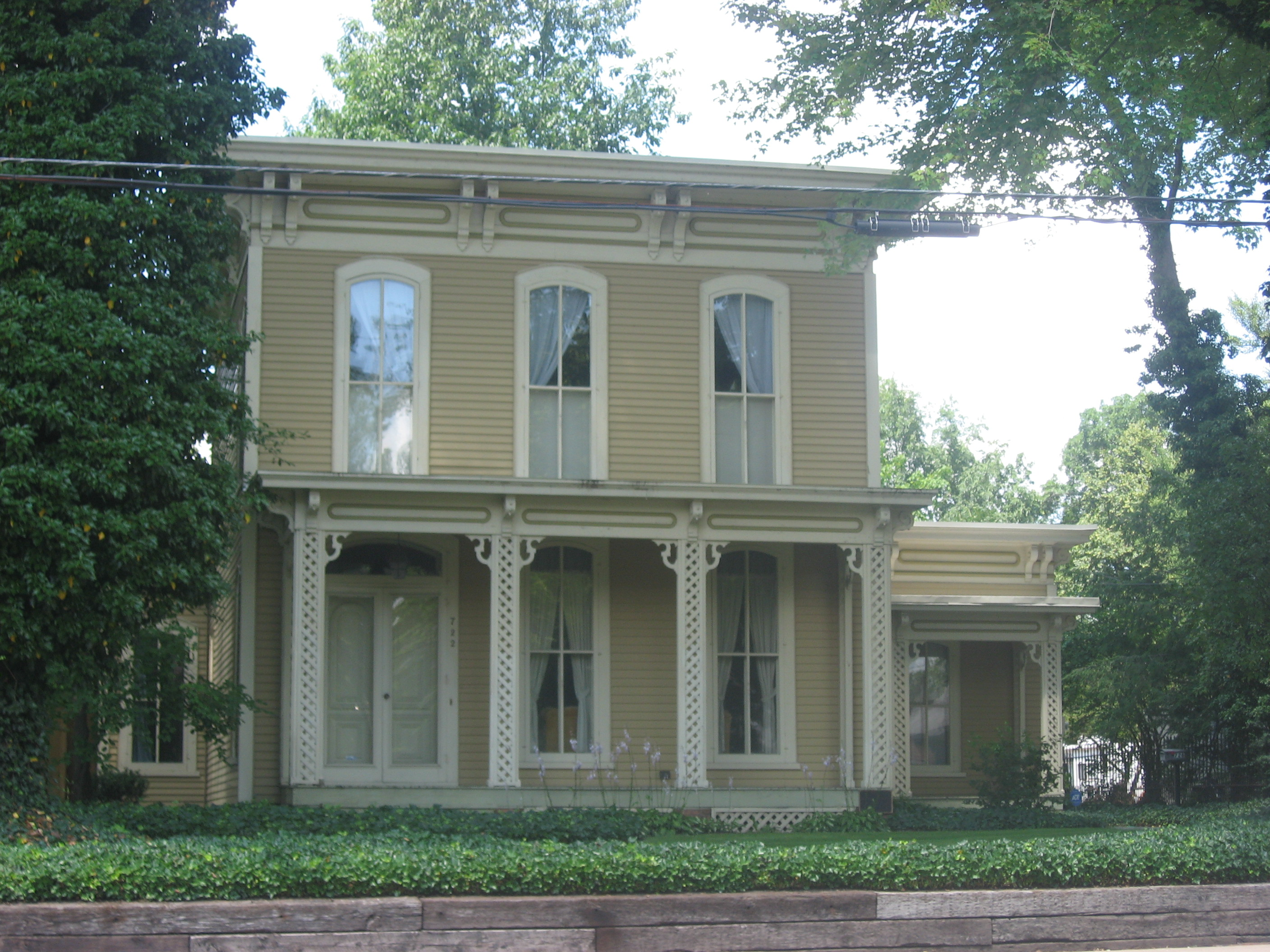
- Eller-Hosford House, July 2013

- Location within Indiana Location within the United States
- Location: 722 Lincoln Way E., Mishawaka, Indiana
- Coordinates: 41°39′41″N 86°10′14″W
- Area: less than one acre
- Built: 1875
- Built by: Eller, Elom
- Architectural style: Italianate
- NRHP reference No.: 83000101
- Added to NRHP: January 27, 1983

Eller-Hosford House, also known as the Donald W. Crawford Residence, is a historic home located at Mishawaka, Indiana. It was built about 1875, and is a two-story, Italianate style frame dwelling with a one-story wing. It sits on a stone foundation, is sheathed in clapboard siding, and has a flat roof. It features large segmental arched windows, a full-width front porch with four columns decorated with lattice work, and cornice with paired large brackets. The house was renovated in 1979–1980.

It was listed on the National Register of Historic Places in 1983.
