= Tivoli Theater (Mishawaka, Indiana) =

- Formerly listed on the U.S. National Register of Historic Places
- Location within Indiana
- Location: 208 N. Main St., Mishawaka, Indiana
- Area: less than one acre
- Built: 1924-1925
- Architect: Rupert, E.P.
- Architectural style: Late 19th and 20th Century Revivals
- NRHP reference No.: 98000304

Significant dates
- Added to NRHP: April 1, 1998
- Removed from NRHP: March 24, 2005

Tivoli Theater was a historic theatre building located at Mishawaka, Indiana, United States. It was built in 1924–1925, and was a two-story, brick building with a facade featuring terracotta ornamentation, a massive central arched window, and decorative stained art glass. The auditorium seated 1,500 patrons. The building consisted of three storefronts and the auditorium and lobby entrance, and office on the second floor. It was the largest theatre in the city. In 1992, Mishawaka announced plans to demolish the theater. It was demolished on February 2, 2005.

It was listed on the National Register of Historic Places in 1998, and delisted in 2005.
