= Ellis-Schindler House =

Historic house in Indiana, United States

- U.S. National Register of Historic Places
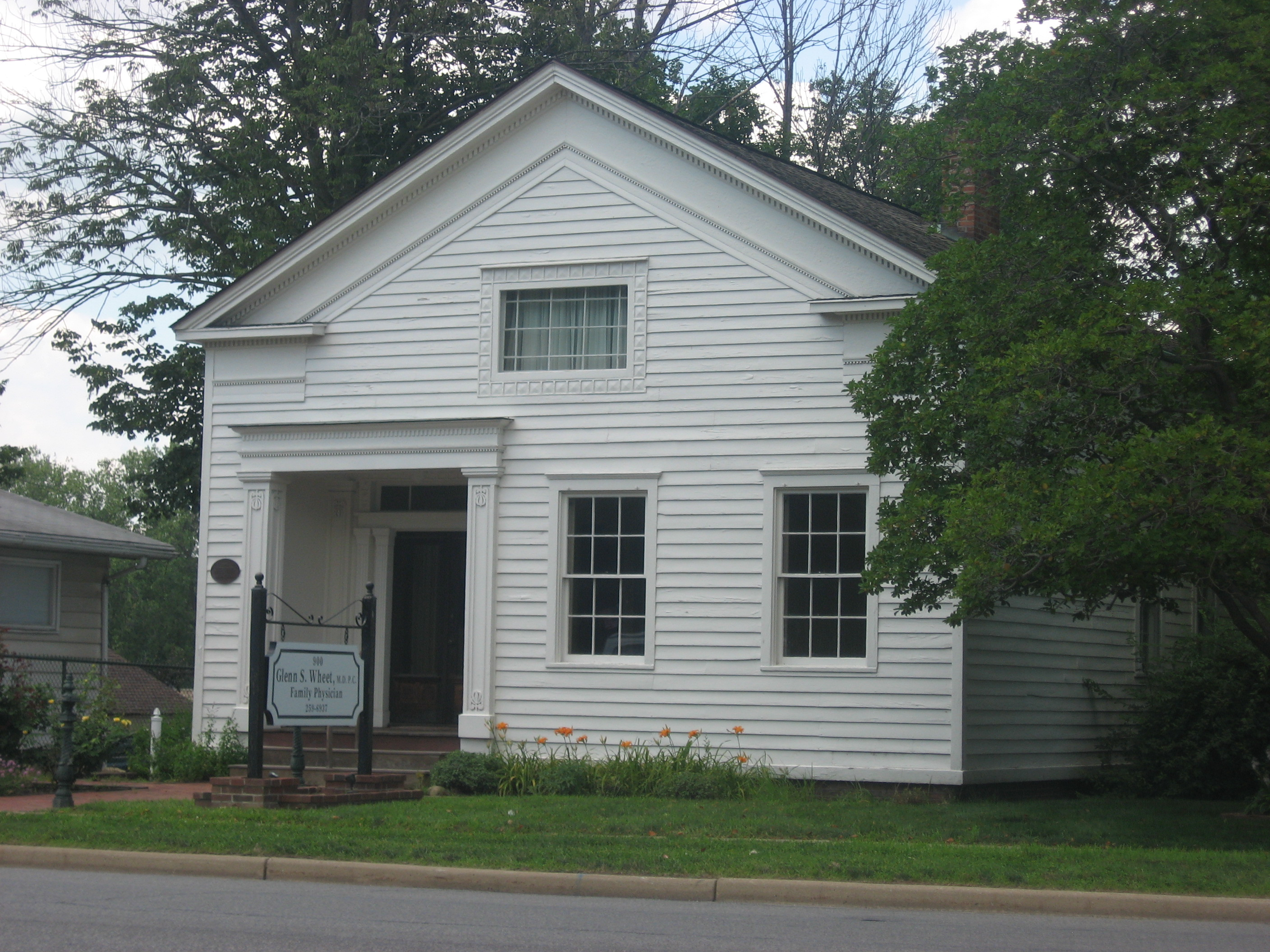
- Ellis-Schindler House, July 2013

- Location within Indiana Location within the United States
- Location: 900 Lincolnway W., Mishawaka, Indiana
- Coordinates: 41°39′39″N 86°11′30″W
- Area: less than one acre
- Built: 1834
- Architectural style: Greek Revival
- NRHP reference No.: 90001926
- Added to NRHP: December 18, 1990

Ellis-Schindler House, also known as the Robert Ellis House, is a historic home located at Mishawaka, Indiana. It was built in 1834, and is a 1 1/2-story, rectangular, Greek Revival style frame dwelling. It has a front gable roof and is sheathed in clapboard siding. The house was moved to its present location and renovated in 1979. It is the oldest known existing structure in Mishawaka.

It was listed on the National Register of Historic Places in 1990.
