= Eric Carpenter =

American soccer player

Eric Lee Carpenter
Personal information
- Full name: Eric Lee Carpenter
- Date of birth: July 17, 1986 (age 40)
- Place of birth: Goshen, Indiana, United States
- Height: 5 ft 11 in (1.80 m)
- Position: Midfielder

Youth career
- 2005–2008: Bethel Pilots

Senior career*
Years	Team	Apps	(Gls)
2009	Cleveland City Stars	6	(0)
- * Club domestic league appearances and goals as of 22 October 2009

Eric Carpenter (born July 17, 1986) is an American soccer player, currently without a club.

== Career ==
=== Youth and amateur ===
Carpenter attended Northridge High School and played college soccer at Bethel College, where he was named MCC All-Conference in 2007 and 2008, was an All-Region selection in 2008, and was the Bethel College Offensive Player of the Year as a senior.

=== Professional ===
Carpenter joined the USL First Division franchise Cleveland City Stars on April 15, 2009 after giving impressive performances during pre-tryouts, when he scored the game-winning goal in a preseason exhibition match against the University of Dayton. He made his professional debut on April 25, 2009, in Cleveland's game against Austin Aztex.
