= Josie Edwards =

American musician

- Origin: Franklin, Indiana
- Genre: Indie rock
- Occupations: Musician; singer; songwriter
- Instruments: Vocals; guitar
- Years active: 2024–present
- Label: AWAL
- Website: josieedwards.bandzoogle.com

Josie Edwards is an American musician and songwriter. She is best known for her 2026 single “Chemical Light", as well as her 2025 hit “good girls”. She has released two EPs and performed at All Points East as a supporting act for Twenty One Pilots alongside Gang of Youths, Bbno$, and Jessie Murph.

== Early life ==
Edwards was born in Franklin, Indiana. She was homeschooled before enrolling in Plymouth High School. She was active in school life, including being inducted into the school's National Honor Society.

Following her graduation from Plymouth High School, Edwards enrolled in Belmont University in Nashville, Tennessee. There, she pursued her career as a singer and songwriter. She presented research for Belmont's Department of Communication Studies.

== Career ==
Edwards released her first single, "The Great Escape", on June 28, 2024. The single performed well on YouTube and TikTok, and Edwards released a music video for the song on YouTube.

The following May, Edwards released a second single, "good girls". In the days following its release, "good girls" went viral, racking up over 33 million streams on Spotify. Edwards quit her job working at a coffee shop to focus on her music. She followed up with a second single, "high hope", before announcing her debut extended play (EP) good girls, featuring both singles. The EP was released on September 5, 2025, and performed well; as of September 2026, it has amassed over 43 million streams on Spotify.

Edwards began the "good girls" tour in the United States before adding additional dates in Europe. Edwards also performed as a last-minute supporting act for Of Monsters And Men's rescheduled North American tour dates. Critical reception was mixed; Tim Bugbee from The Big Takeover wrote that, "Bravely standing on an otherwise empty stage with a constant stage light giving backlighting, [Edwards] played a mostly agreeable but fairly beige set of acoustic-based songs, leaning heavily on vocals delivered in a pronounced Taylor Swift meter."

In late February 2026, Edwards released the first single off her second EP, Greetings from Bleak St.. Three singles were released: "The Poet and Her Vice (Happy Endings)", "Dog Prophecies", and "Gravedigger." On July 24, 2026, Edwards released Greetings from Bleak Street. The EP performed well, and was met with critical praise.

In the weeks after its release, "Chemical Light", a non-single from the EP, grew rapidly in popularity. Jonathan Eig at AudioPhix praised the song, stating that "her latest piano ballad starts languidly, but builds an unrelenting momentum to almost anthemic proportions." He continued on to praise Edwards' style, writing that "she is one of the rare few who has been able to turn out music that walks the balance beam of totally personal and unique songs which are nonetheless capable of broad pop appeal."

On August 20, 2026, Edwards was announced as a last-minute supporting act at All Points East festival, supporting headliner Twenty One Pilots alongside Gang of Youths, Bbno$, and Jessie Murph. On August 30, Edwards opened the festival's second weekend on the West Stage. Her presence and performance was well received by both concertgoers and critics. Finn Delisle from music is to blame wrote, "performing with a band she had only met earlier this week, the Noah Kahan-esque folk-pop singer-songwriter from Indiana reeled off a number of songs, with much of the set drawn from her recent EP Greetings From Bleak St.." The audience watching was "clapping and dancing along, warming themselves up for the day ahead."

In September 2026, Myles Smith announced that Edwards would perform as a supporting act on the European leg of his tour. Later that month, Michelle Branch announced that Edwards would be performing as a supporting act for her everywhere and back again tour. Between these announcements, Edwards announced her own Greetings From Bleak Street Tour, her first as a headliner.

In October 2026, Edwards performed as a supporting act for three of Giant Rooks's October shows in Frankfurt, Wien, and Stuttgart. On October 21, she released a music video for "Chemical Light".

== Discography ==
Josie Edwards discography
- Studio albums: 0
- EPs: 2
- Singles: 7
- Music videos: 3

=== EPs ===
List of EPs, with selected details
Title	EP details	Peak chart positions	
Title	EP details	Billboard	UK Indie
good girls	Released: September 5, 2025; Format: Digital; Label: Independent	—	—
Greetings From Bleak St.	Released: July 24, 2026; Format: Digital; Label: AWAL	—	—
"—" denotes recording did not chart in that territory.
