= Jason Spriggs =

American football player (born 1994)

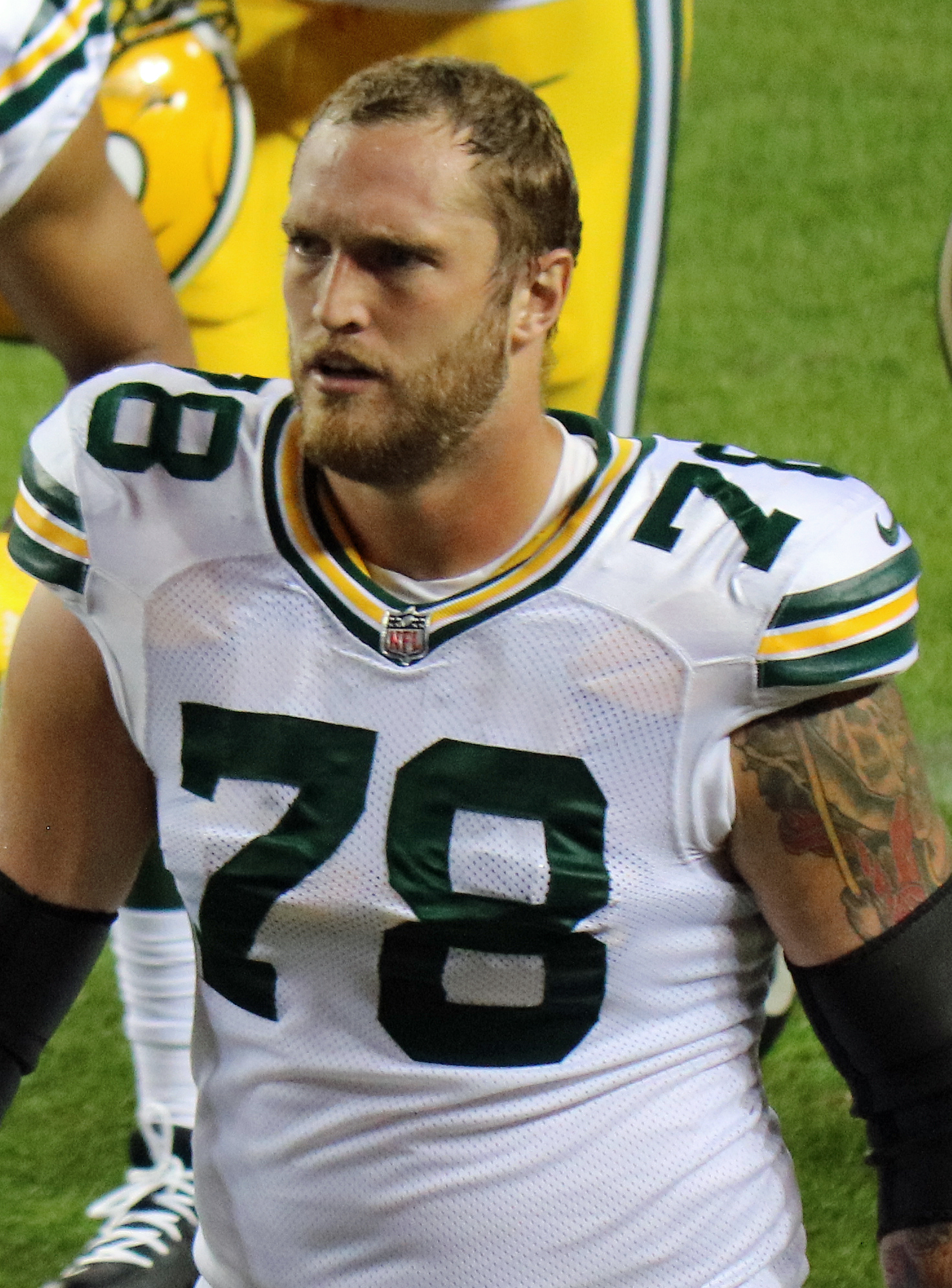
- Spriggs with the Green Bay Packers in 2017

No. 78, 69
- Position: Offensive tackle

Personal information
- Born: May 17, 1994 (age 32); Chicago, Illinois, U.S.
- Listed height: 6 ft 6 in (1.98 m)
- Listed weight: 301 lb (137 kg)

Career information
- High school: Concord (Elkhart, Indiana)
- College: Indiana
- NFL draft: 2016: 2nd round, 48th overall pick

Career history
- Green Bay Packers (2016–2019); Chicago Bears (2020); Atlanta Falcons (2021); Indianapolis Colts (2022)*
- * Offseason or practice squad member only

Awards and highlights
- First-team All-American (2015); Second-team All-Big Ten (2015)

Career NFL statistics
- Games played: 59
- Games started: 10
- Fumble recoveries: 2
- Stats at Pro Football Reference

Jason Michael Spriggs (born May 17, 1994) is an American former professional football player who was an offensive tackle in the National Football League (NFL). He played college football for the Indiana Hoosiers.

== Early life ==
Spriggs was born to Rick and Michelle Spriggs on May 17, 1994, in Elkhart, Indiana. He attended Concord High School where he lettered in basketball, lacrosse, track and field, and also played offensive tackle, defensive end, and long snapper for head coach Tim Dawson. During his early football career he was a three-year starter and recorded 58 tackles (19 for loss), seven sacks, three forced fumbles and recoveries, and three passes defensed. He had a touchdown off of a fumble recovery. He was also a team captain, and was named the team's most valuable offensive lineman in 2011 and most valuable defensive lineman in 2010. Spriggs was named to the Indiana Football Coaches Association All-State Top 50 team in 2011.

Coming out of high school, Spriggs measured in at 6-foot-6-inches tall and weighed in at 249 pounds. He was ranked as a three star prospect by ESPN.com. He was ranked as the 22nd best prospect in the state, and the 135th best in the country. He received attention from a number of schools, and received scholarship offers from Indiana, Ball State, Buffalo, Eastern Michigan, Miami of Ohio, Northern Illinois, Toledo, and Western Michigan. He was described by an ESPN analyst as having some raw tools, and who could possibly project to tight end at the college level. He was listed on Rivals.com as a three star prospect at tight end.

== College career ==
Spriggs ultimately accepted a scholarship from Indiana University and started all 12 games in his first year on the offensive line. He led the team with 80 knockdowns that year and allowed only two sacks in the 961 downs he played. As a whole, the offensive line did not allow a sack in five games. He was named an Honorable Mention to the All-Big Ten Conference team by the coaches and media, and was named to the ESPN.com Big Ten All-Freshman team.

Going into his second year, Spriggs again started all 12 games at the left tackle position. He was named the Indiana Player of the week for his efforts in a game against Purdue. Following the year, he was again named an All-Big Ten Honorable Mention by the coaches and media.

Spriggs' junior year proved to be one of his best statistically. He played in eleven games and started ten of them at left tackle. He allowed two sacks in 689 snaps and allowed Tevin Coleman to set a school record with 2,000 rushing yards in a season. He was named a conference honorable mention by the media.

In his final year as a Hoosier, Spriggs was named a team captain and allowed only two sacks in 475 pass attempts, starting at left tackle. He had a team-leading 79 knockdowns. His team became the first since 1995 to lead the league in total passing and scoring offense. His efforts had him named as a first-team All-American by the Football Writers Association of America.

== Professional career ==
=== Pre-draft ===
Spriggs was predicted to be a second-round pick in the NFL Draft by Lance Zierlein. He commented that he had a good frame for the position, exhibited quick movement, showed good combination as a zone blocker, and was active with his hands. He was concerned about his strength, but overall he believed that he had a good chance to be a starting left tackle at the professional level.

Pre-draft measurables
Height	Weight	Arm length	Hand span	40-yard dash	10-yard split	20-yard split	20-yard shuttle	Three-cone drill	Vertical jump	Broad jump	Bench press	Wonderlic
6 ft 5 5/8 in (1.97 m)	301 lb (137 kg)	34 1/8 in (0.87 m)	10 1/8 in (0.26 m)	4.94 s	1.76 s	2.90 s	4.44 s	7.70 s	31 1/2 in (0.80 m)	9 ft 7 in (2.92 m)	31 reps	20
All values from NFL Combine

=== Green Bay Packers ===
Spriggs was selected by the Green Bay Packers in the second round (48th overall) of the 2016 NFL draft. On May 9, 2016, the Packers signed Spriggs to a four-year contract reported to be worth a total of $5.00 million, which includes a $1.83 million signing bonus.

On September 21, 2017, Spriggs was placed on injured reserve with a hamstring injury. He was activated off injured reserve to the active roster on November 18, 2017. He started five games at right tackle before being placed back on injured reserve on December 26, 2017, with a knee injury.

In 2018, Spriggs played in 13 games, starting two at right tackle in place of an injured Bryan Bulaga.

On August 6, 2019, Spriggs was waived/injured by the Packers. After clearing waivers, he was placed on injured reserve a day later.

=== Chicago Bears ===
On April 17, 2020, Spriggs signed a one-year contract with the Chicago Bears. He was placed on the reserve/COVID-19 list by the team on November 3, 2020, and activated six days later.

=== Atlanta Falcons ===
On July 26, 2021, Spriggs signed with the Atlanta Falcons.

=== Indianapolis Colts ===
On June 12, 2022, Spriggs signed with the Indianapolis Colts. He was released on August 12, 2022.
