= Warsaw Community High School =

Location
- 1 Tiger Lane; Warsaw, Indiana 46580; United States; 41°13′25″N 85°51′57″W

Information
- Type: Public high school
- Sister school: Warsaw Area Career Center
- School district: Warsaw Community Schools
- Superintendent: David Hoffert
- Principal: Troy Akers
- Teaching staff: 154.49 (FTE)
- Grades: 9–12
- Enrollment: 2,119 (2023–2024)
- Student to teacher ratio: 13.72
- Colors: Orange, black, and white
- Athletics conference: Northern Lakes Conference
- Mascot: Tigers
- Rival: Plymouth Rockies; Wawasee Warriors; Concord Minuteman
- Newspaper: The Roar
- Website: wchs.warsaw.k12.in.us

Warsaw Community High School (WCHS) is a public high school located in Warsaw, Indiana (the county seat of Kosciusko County), United States. It is in the Warsaw Community Schools district. The principal of WCHS is Troy Akers. The current building located on State Road 15 was built in 1990. In partnership with Warsaw Area Career Center (WACC), which is located on the property of WCHS, Warsaw is able to provide numerous career and college opportunities for students. WCHS offers dual credit, Advanced Placement credits, honors credits, and the SAT.

The 2008 documentary film American Teen was filmed at the high school during the 2005–2006 school year.

== Demographics ==
The demographic breakdown of Warsaw's enrollment in 2020–2021 is as follows:

- White – 70.2%
- Hispanic – 23.3%
- Black – 1.9%
- Asian –1.4%
- Multiracial – 3.0%

== Athletics ==
The Warsaw Tigers compete in the Northern Lakes Conference. The school colors are orange, black, and white. The following IHSAA sanctioned sports are offered at Warsaw:

- Baseball (boys)
- Basketball (girls & boys)
  - Girls state champions - 1976, 1978
  - Boys state champions - 1984
- Cross country (girls & boys)
- Football (boys)
- Golf (girls & boys)
  - Boys state champions - 2005
- Gymnastics (girls)
- Soccer (girls & boys)
- Softball (girls)
  - State champions - 1991
- Swimming (girls & boys)
- Tennis (girls & boys)
- Track (girls & boys)
  - Unified state champions - 2014
  - Unified state champions - 2016
- Volleyball (girls & boys)
- Wrestling (girls & boys)

== Notable alumni ==
- Whitey Bell – American basketball player (1932–2025)
- Bubba the Love Sponge – American radio personality (born 1966)
- Rick Fox – Canadian actor, professional basketball player (born 1969)
- Randy Heisler – American Olympic discus thrower (born 1961)
- Kyle Mangas – American basketball player (born 1999)
- Harrison Mevis – American football placekicker (born 2002)
- Nic Moore – American professional basketball player (born 1991)
- Mason Plumlee – American basketball player (born 1990)
- Miles Plumlee – American basketball player (born 1988)
- Max Truex – American Olympic long-distance runner (1935–1991)
