= Chick Maggioli =

American football player (1922–2012)

No. 81, 19, 80
- Positions: Defensive back, halfback

Personal information
- Born: May 17, 1922; Mishawaka, Indiana, U.S.
- Died: December 20, 2012 (aged 90); Mishawaka, Indiana, U.S.
- Listed height: 5 ft 11 in (1.80 m)
- Listed weight: 178 lb (81 kg)

Career information
- High school: Mishawaka
- College: Indiana; Notre Dame (1943-1944); Illinois (1946-1947)
- NFL draft: 1946: 11th round, 99th overall pick

Career history
- Buffalo Bills (1948); Detroit Lions (1949); Baltimore Colts (1950)

Awards and highlights
- National champion (1943)

Career NFL/AAFC statistics
- Rushing yards: 27
- Rushing average: 2.5
- Receptions: 4
- Receiving yards: 32
- Total touchdowns: 1
- Interceptions: 12
- Stats at Pro Football Reference

Achille Fred "Chick" Maggioli (May 17, 1922 – December 20, 2012) was an American professional football defensive back and halfback in the National Football League (NFL) for the Detroit Lions and the Baltimore Colts. He played college football for the Indiana Hoosiers, the Notre Dame Fighting Irish, and the Illinois Fighting Illini and was selected by the Washington Redskins in the 1946 NFL draft. He also played in the All-America Football Conference (AAFC) for the Buffalo Bills.

== Early life ==
Born in Mishawaka, Indiana, Maggioli was an all-state football player at Mishawaka High School, graduating in 1941. He then attended and played college football at Indiana University in 1942. He joined the Marine Corps Officer Training Program in 1943, which transferred him to the University of Notre Dame, where he played football in 1943 and 1944. At Notre Dame, he was the reserve halfback on coach Frank Leahy's national champion 1943 Notre Dame Fighting Irish football team and a starting halfback in 1944. Called to active duty before the end of the 1944 season, he served in the Marine Corps and was awarded the Purple Heart at the Battle of Okinawa. Returning from World War II, Maggioli played halfback on the 1946 Illinois Fighting Illini football team, which won the Big Ten Conference and the 1947 Rose Bowl, graduating from the University of Illinois Urbana-Champaign that May.

== Professional career ==
Maggioli was drafted in the 11th round of the 1946 NFL draft by the Washington Redskins and ultimately played for the Buffalo Bills as a two-way player in 1948, his team winning the Eastern Division of the AAFL. He played defensive back for the Detroit Lions in 1949 and with the Baltimore Colts in 1950, intercepting eight passes in the final year of his pro football career.

== Later life ==
Maggioli was inducted into both the Indiana Football Hall of Fame and the Mishawaka High School Athletic Hall of Fame. He died on December 20, 2012, in Mishawaka, Indiana.
