= School City of Mishawaka =

School district in Mishawaka, Indiana

Address
- 1402 S Main Street Mishawaka, IN, 46544
- Coordinates: 41.649187°N 86.179388°W

District information
- Type: Public
- Grades: PK–12
- Superintendent: Dr. Theodore Stevens
- Schools: 9
- NCES District ID: 1806840

Students and staff
- Students: 5,149 (2020-21)
- Teachers: 370.15 (FTE)
- Staff: 700
- Student–teacher ratio: 13.9∶1

Other information
- Website: Official website

School City of Mishawaka is a public school district, headquartered in Mishawaka, Indiana.

The district includes the central part of the city.

== History ==
In 1991 the district began educating children under the care of the Family & Children's Center (FCC), an organization serving disabled children. The FCC sued the school district in 1993 because the district did not want to pay certain fees.

In 2019 Wayne Barker became the superintendent.

== Schools ==
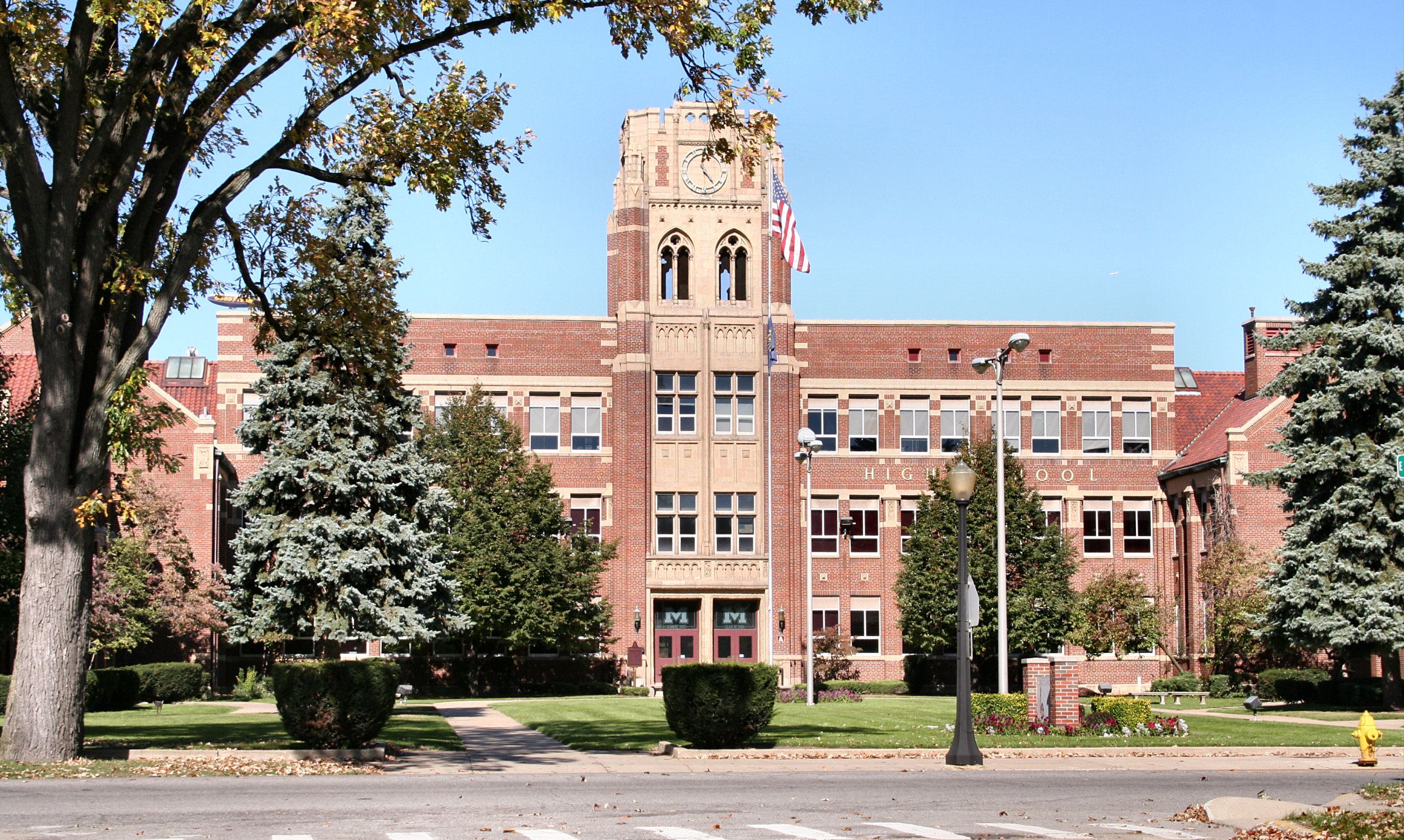
Mishawaka High School

As of February 2022, the district holds jurisdiction over 2 secondary and 7 primary schools. Listed below, they are:

Secondary

- Mishawaka High School
- John Young Middle School

Elementary

- Battell Elementary School
- Beiger Elementary School
- Emmons Elementary School
- Hums Elementary School
- LaSalle Elementary School
- Liberty Elementary School
- Twin Branch Elementary School

== Demographics ==
According to the National Center for Education Statistics, School City of Mishawaka served 5,149 students during the 2020–21 academic year. The district employed 370.15 full time equivalent classroom teachers, resulting in a student–teacher ratio of 13.9∶1

Enrollment by Race/Ethnicity (2015–19 Dataset)
Race	Enrolled Pupils*	% of District
African American	257	5%
Asian	51	1%
Hispanic	257	5%
Native American	51	1%
White	4,274	83%
Native Hawaiian, Pacific Islander	0	0%
Multi-Race, Non-Hispanic	257	5%
Total	5,149	100%

* Approximate number of enrolled pupils is calculated based on total number of students in district, multiplied by reported percentage, and rounded to nearest whole student.
