= Battell Park Historic District =

Historic district in Indiana, United States

- U.S. National Register of Historic Places
- U.S. Historic district
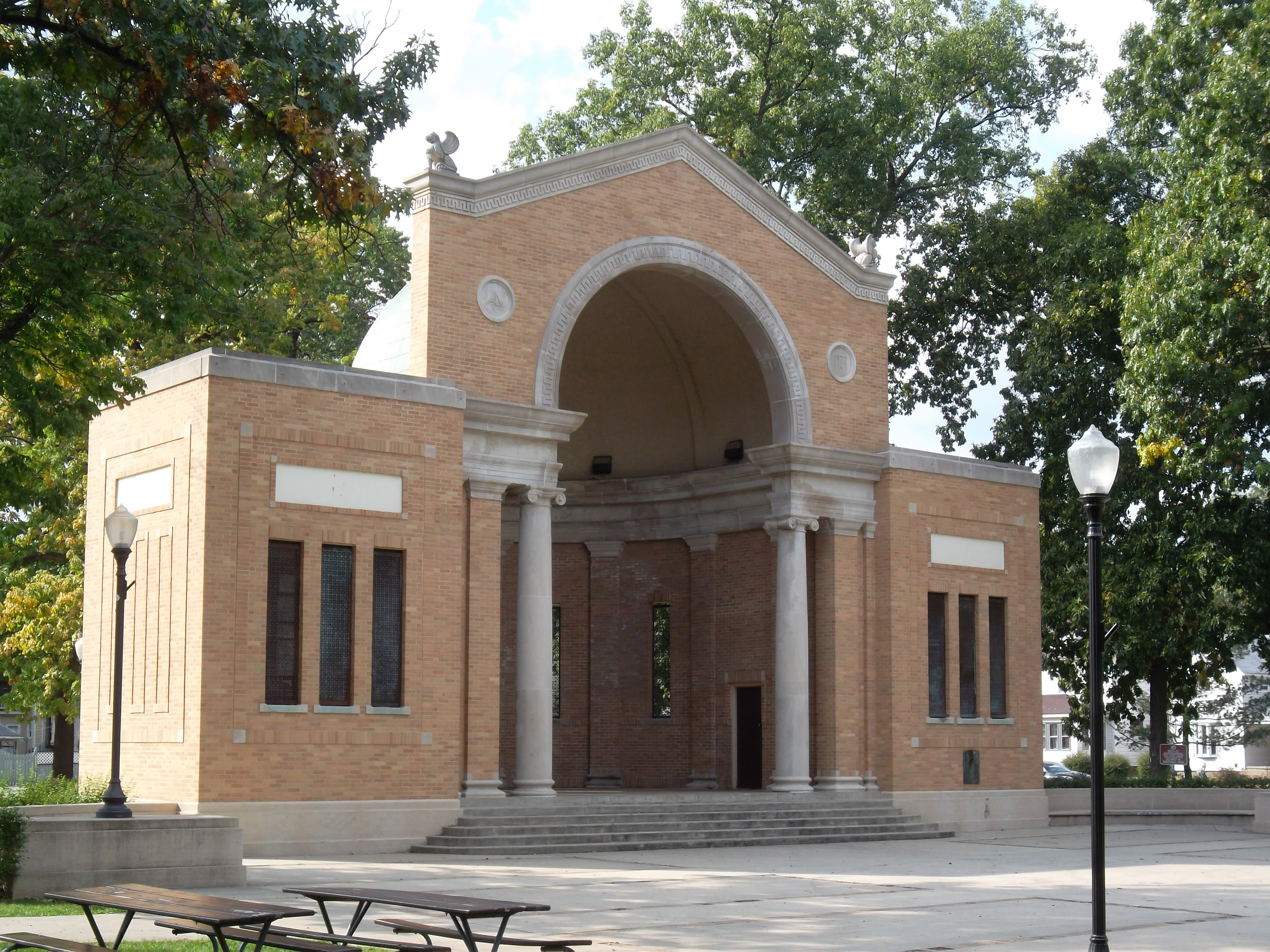
- Battell Park bandstand, September 2012

- Location within Indiana Location within the United States
- Location: Mishawaka Ave., Mishawaka, Indiana
- Coordinates: 41°39′56″N 86°11′14″W
- Area: 11 acres (4.5 ha)
- Built: 1884, 1927, 1936-1937
- Architect: Works Progress Administration
- Architectural style: Classical Revival, Park Rustic
- NRHP reference No.: 95001541
- Added to NRHP: January 11, 1996

Battell Park Historic District is a historic public park and national historic district located at Mishawaka, Indiana. The district encompasses two contributing buildings, one contributing site, two contributing structures, and one contributing object in a public park. It was established in 1881, and subsequently developed with a Soldiers' War Memorial erected in 1884 and Classical Revival style bandshell erected in 1927. In 1936–1937, the Works Progress Administration added a five-tier, cascading rock garden with a waterfall, small pools, and arched bridge.

It was listed on the National Register of Historic Places in 1996.
