= Normain Heights Historic District =

Historic district in Indiana, United States

- U.S. National Register of Historic Places
- U.S. Historic district
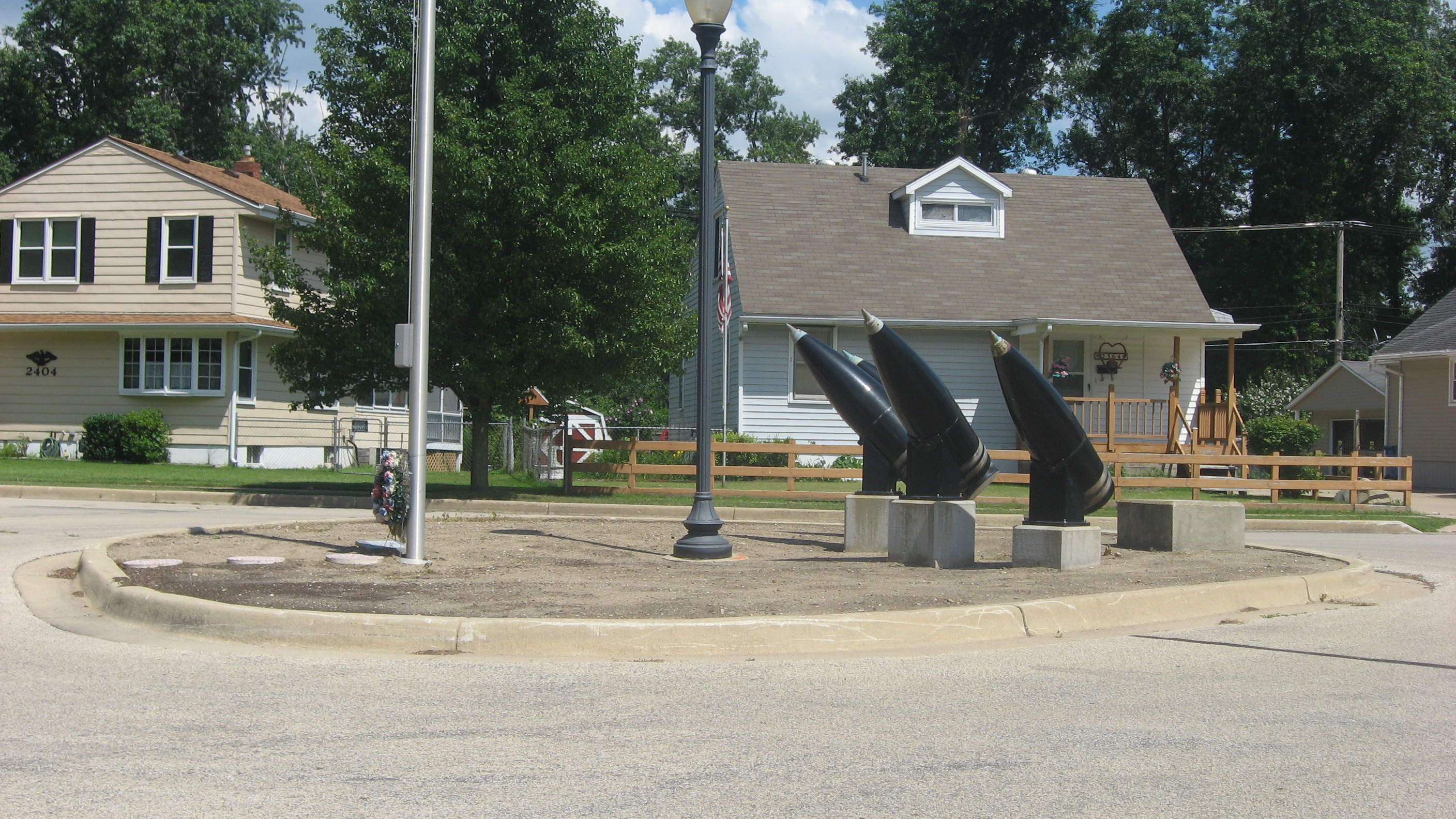
- Normandy and Guam in Normain Heights, July 2013

- Location within Indiana Location within the United States
- Location: Roughly 2300-2900 N. Main, 2300-2800 Normandy, & 100-200 blocks E. Ardennes, Palau, Bastogne, Leyte, Saint Lo & Guam, Mishawaka, Indiana
- Coordinates: 41°41′03″N 86°10′47″W
- Area: 76 acres (31 ha)
- Built: 1947; 79 years ago
- Architect: Schwartz, Karl
- Architectural style: Modern Movement
- NRHP reference No.: 02000203
- Added to NRHP: March 20, 2002

Normain Heights Historic District is a national historic district located at Mishawaka, Indiana. The district encompasses 224 contributing buildings and one contributing site in a planned post-World War II residential subdivision of Mishawaka. It was developed between 1946 and 1951, and includes notable examples of Modern Movement architecture. They are in seven house types randomly scattered throughout the district and were designed for families with low-to-moderate incomes.

It was listed on the National Register of Historic Places in 2002.
