= Whitey Bell =

American basketball player (1932–2025)

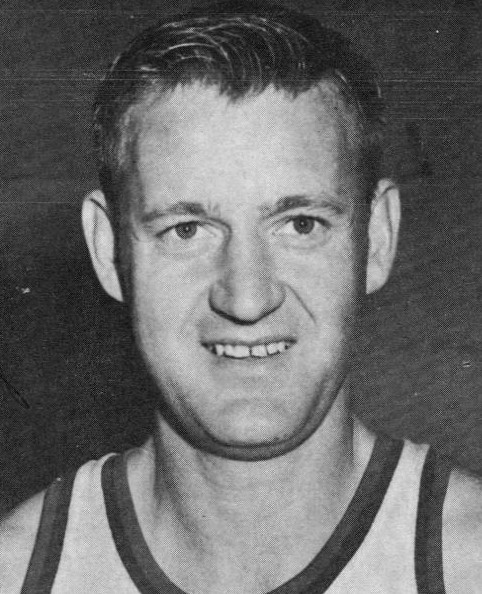

Personal information
- Born: September 13, 1932 Monticello, Kentucky, U.S.
- Died: September 3, 2025 (aged 92) Hickory, North Carolina, U.S.
- Listed height: 6 ft 0 in (1.83 m)
- Listed weight: 180 lb (82 kg)

Career information
- High school: Warsaw Community (Warsaw, Indiana)
- College: NC State (1954–1958)
- NBA draft: 1958: undrafted
- Playing career: 1959–1963
- Position: Guard
- Number: 15

Career history
- 1960–1961: New York Knicks
- 1961–1963: San Francisco Saints
- 1962: Pittsburgh Rens
- Stats at NBA.com
- Stats at Basketball Reference

William Hoyet Bell (September 13, 1932 – September 3, 2025) was an American basketball player.

Bell played collegiately for the North Carolina State University. Bell averaged 14.2 points per game as a senior for NC State during the 1957–58 season.

He played for the New York Knicks (1959–61) in the NBA for 36 games. Bell then played with the San Francisco Saints (1961–62) of the American Basketball League and briefly in 1962 with the Pittsburgh Rens of the ABL. On November 1, 1961, Bell scored 30 points in a game against the Kansas City Steers.

Bell died in Hickory, North Carolina on September 3, 2025, at the age of 92.

== Career statistics ==
Legend
GP	Games played	GS	Games started	MPG	Minutes per game
FG%	Field goal percentage	3P%	3-point field goal percentage	FT%	Free throw percentage
RPG	Rebounds per game	APG	Assists per game	SPG	Steals per game
BPG	Blocks per game	PPG	Points per game	**Bold**	Career high

=== NBA ===
==== Regular season ====
Year	Team	GP	MPG	FG%	FT%	RPG	APG	PPG
1959–60	New York	**31**	**14.5**	.378	**.651**	**2.8**	**1.8**	**5.4**
1960–61	New York	5	9.0	**.389**	.333	1.4	.2	3.0
Career		36	13.7	.379	.630	2.6	1.6	5.1
