= Garth Stroup Home =

Historic house in Indiana, United States

- Merrifield-Cass House
- U.S. National Register of Historic Places
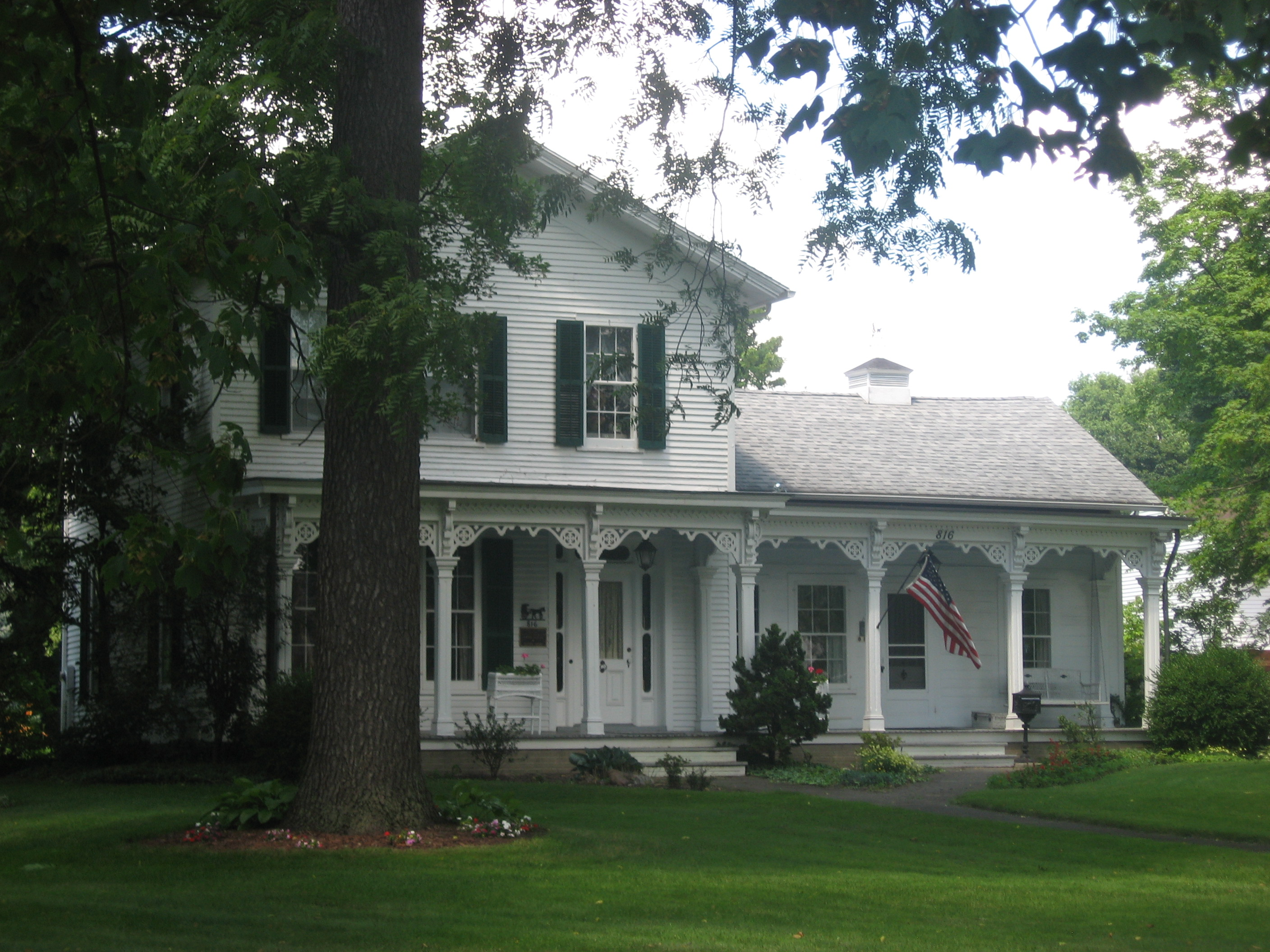
- Merrifield-Cass House, July 2013

- Location within Indiana
- Location: 816 E. Lincolnway, Mishawaka, Indiana
- Coordinates: 41°39′41″N 86°10′28″W
- Area: 1.4 acres (0.57 ha)
- Built: 1837, 1867
- Architectural style: Greek Revival, Federal, Carpenter Gothic
- NRHP reference No.: 83000147
- Added to NRHP: June 16, 1983

Garth Stroup House, also known as the Merrifield-Cass House, is a historic home located at Mishawaka, Indiana. The original one-story dwelling was built in 1837, and enlarged to two-stories and one-story wing added in 1867. The frame dwelling exhibits Greek Revival, Federal, and Carpenter Gothic style design elements. It sits on a fieldstone and brick foundation. It features porches with gingerbread trim. The house is thought to be the oldest dwelling in continuing use in Mishawaka.

It was listed on the National Register of Historic Places in 1983.
