= Scott Skiles =

American basketball coach and former player (born 1964)

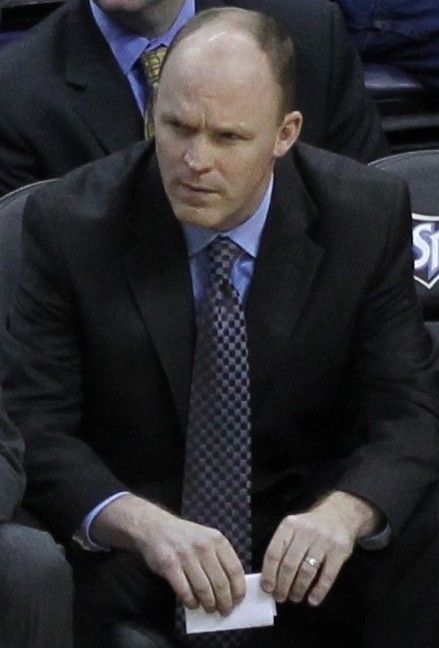
- Skiles coaching the Milwaukee Bucks in 2011

Personal information
- Born: March 5, 1964 (age 62) La Porte, Indiana, U.S.
- Listed height: 6 ft 1 in (1.85 m)
- Listed weight: 180 lb (82 kg)

Career information
- High school: Plymouth (Plymouth, Indiana)
- College: Michigan State (1982–1986)
- NBA draft: 1986: 1st round, 22nd overall pick
- Drafted by: Milwaukee Bucks
- Playing career: 1986–1997
- Position: Point guard
- Number: 5, 3, 4
- Coaching career: 1996–2016

Career history

Playing
- 1986–1987: Milwaukee Bucks
- 1987–1989: Indiana Pacers
- 1989–1994: Orlando Magic
- 1994–1995: Washington Bullets
- 1995–1996: Philadelphia 76ers
- 1996–1997: PAOK Thessaloniki

Career highlights
- NBA Most Improved Player (1991); Consensus second-team All-American (1986); Big Ten Player of the Year (1986); First-team All-Big Ten (1986); No. 4 retired by Michigan State Spartans

Career NBA statistics
- Points: 6,652 (11.1 ppg)
- Rebounds: 1,526 (2.5 rpg)
- Assists: 3,881 (6.5 apg)
- Stats at NBA.com
- Stats at Basketball Reference
Medals
Men's basketball
Representing United States
FIBA U19 World Championship
Gold medal – first place	1983 Palma de Mallorca	National team

Scott Allen Skiles Sr. (born March 5, 1964) is an American former professional basketball coach and player. A first-round draft pick from the Michigan State Spartans, Skiles played ten seasons as a point guard in the National Basketball Association (NBA). He holds the NBA record for assists in one game with 30, set with the Orlando Magic during a December game in the 1990–1991 season. After that season, he earned the NBA Most Improved Player Award. Skiles also played in the NBA for the Milwaukee Bucks, Indiana Pacers, Washington Bullets and Philadelphia 76ers before he finished his playing career with PAOK Thessaloniki of Greece in 1997. He became a coach after his playing retirement and was the head coach for the Phoenix Suns, Chicago Bulls, Milwaukee Bucks and Orlando Magic.

== High school and college ==
In 1982, Skiles led Plymouth High School to the Indiana State Championship, scoring 39 points to lead the Pilgrims past the Gary Roosevelt Panthers in double overtime. During that season, Skiles led the state in scoring, averaging 29.3 points per game.

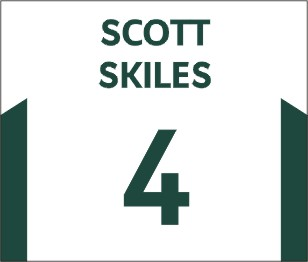
Skiles' #4 was retired by Michigan State University in 1998

Skiles set several school records during his career there, including most points in a home game (53) and most points in an away game (56). He left Plymouth as the school's all-time career scoring leader (1,788 points), a record that would stand until 2005. Skiles had his number 22 jersey retired at Plymouth High School in 1992.

Skiles attended Michigan State University, where in his senior season he was a First Team All-America selection as well as the Big Ten Conference Player of the Year and scoring champion. He left MSU as its all-time career scoring leader (2,145 points) and still holds the Spartans' record for most points scored in a season (850). While in East Lansing, he was arrested and charged with felony possession of cocaine and misdemeanor possession of marijuana. The cocaine charge was dropped, and Skiles pleaded guilty to the marijuana possession. He was arrested and charged with drunken driving a year later and served 15 days in jail. During his senior season, Skiles committed a parole violation on an earlier marijuana conviction, and served a brief jail sentence.

== Playing career ==
The Milwaukee Bucks made Skiles the 22nd selection of the 1986 NBA draft. In ten seasons, he played for the Bucks (1986–87), Indiana Pacers (1987–89), Orlando Magic (1989–94), Washington Bullets (1994–95), and Philadelphia 76ers (1995–96).

=== Milwaukee Bucks (1986–1987) ===
Skiles made his NBA debut with the Bucks on November 11, 1986, against the Indiana Pacers, recording 2 rebounds and 5 assists in the 102–94 win. Skiles was seldom used his rookie season with the Bucks, averaging 3.8 points and 3.5 assists in just 13 games off the bench.

=== Indiana Pacers (1987–1989) ===
On June 21, 1987, Skiles was traded by the Bucks to the Indiana Pacers in exchange for a 1989 2nd-round pick (which would later be used to select Gary Leonard). With the Pacers in 1987–88, Skiles averaged even fewer minutes but played in more games, increasing his scoring marginally to 4.4 points and posting the same 3.5 assists per game in 50 games, just two of them starts. He played in 80 games in 1988–89, starting just 13 and averaging 6.8 points and 4.9 assists in slightly under 20 minutes a game.

=== Orlando Magic (1989–1994) ===
In 1989 Skiles was selected by the newly formed Orlando Magic in the NBA expansion draft. Mainly a backup point guard, he scored 7.7 points and posted 4.8 assists in 20.9 minutes per game in 70 games, 48 off the bench. In 1990–91 he transitioned to a starting role at the position, jumping to a career high 17.2 points and improved 8.4 assists in 34.4 minutes over 79 games and 66 starts. The season was highlighted on December 30, 1990, when Skiles racked up 30 assists in Orlando's 155–116 victory over the Denver Nuggets at Orlando Arena, breaking Kevin Porter's NBA single-game assists record (29). His well more than doubling scoring and nearly doubling his assists marks from the previous year earned him the NBA Most Improved Player Award.

The next year, 1991–92, was a bit of a reversal of form, his numbers dropping off just a bit to 14.1 points and 7.3 assists in 31.7 minutes in 75 games, with games started, field goals made, field goal percentage, 2-pointers made, 2-point percentage, 3-pointers made, 3-point percentage, free throws, free throw percentage, offensive rebounds, defensive rebounds, total rebounds, and steals all taking a hit.

1992–93 saw nearly all his numbers bounce back, with scoring up to 15.4 points, a career high in assists with 9.4 a game, and career highs in shooting percentage and 2-point shooting percentage in a career high 39.6 minutes in 78 games, all starts.

Skiles played in all 82 games in 1993–94 but only started 46, with major drop-offs in minutes, field goals, field goal percentage, 2-pointers made, 2-point percentage, rebounds, assists, and scoring, points falling to 9.9 a game and assists to 6.1 per. Skiles began the year as a starter but in the second half of the season, Penny Hardaway became the starter, relegating Skiles to the bench. During the 1994 offseason, Skiles was traded to the Washington Bullets in the offseason to create salary cap space.

=== Washington Bullets (1994–1995) ===
For the Washington Bullets in 1994–95, Skiles' minutes were back up to 33.5 per game in just 62 games, all starts, and both his scoring and assists also increased - to 13.0 and 7.3 respectively.

=== Philadelphia 76ers (1995–1996) ===
Skiles spent only a single season in Washington, moving on to the Philadelphia 76ers for his final NBA campaign in 1995–96. Appearing in only 10 games Skiles stats took a tumble, to 6.3 points and 3.8 assists in 23.6 minutes per game while starting 9 of the games.

=== PAOK (1996–1997) ===
Nursing a serious shoulder injury in 1996, Skiles left the U.S. for the Greek League, joining PAOK in Thessaloniki, signing a 1-year contract worth more than $1 million. Expectations were high for the new arrival from the NBA, but midway through the season injuries and contract problems with key players threatened the season for both PAOK and French coach Michel Gomez. Still struggling with injury himself, and increasingly at odds with Gomez, Skiles asked to be released from his contract. Instead, president Lakis Alexopoulos fired Gomez and offered Skiles the job. Despite lacking three of their top players due to injury, Skiles led PAOK to a winning record as coach in the remainder of the '96-'97 season, and an unexpected 3rd-place finish in the Greek League, thus assuring a qualification to the following year's Euroleague.

== Coaching career ==
=== Phoenix Suns (1997–2002) ===
Skiles returned to the NBA for the 1997–98 season as an assistant coach with the Phoenix Suns, being elevated to head coach in 1999.

Under Skiles, Phoenix compiled a .595 win-loss record and made the playoffs in two of his three years as head coach, including a first-round win over the defending NBA champion San Antonio Spurs in 2000.

=== Chicago Bulls (2003–2007) ===
After a two-year absence from the game, Skiles came to the Chicago Bulls as head coach in 2003. He immediately focused on improving the young Bulls' defense and developing greater consistency in a talented but underachieving team. In the first full year under his direction, Chicago limited its opposition to an NBA-best .422 field goal percentage and held their opponents to a franchise record and league high 26 straight games below 100 points. An NBA best 13–3 mark in January 2005 earned Skiles the NBA Eastern Conference Coach of the Month honor.

The 2006 Bulls went 41–41, earning a 7th seed in the playoffs falling to 2nd seeded Miami Heat in six games. In 2007 the Bulls improved to a 49–33 and again faced the Heat in the first round of the post-season, this time sweeping them in four games. They lost the first three games of the second-round against the top-seeded Detroit Pistons, dropping the last at the United Center after holding a double-digit lead for much of the game. After a two-game rally they were eliminated in six.

The Bulls had high expectations heading into the 2007–08 season. Mired in last place in the Central Division 25 games in, they were 9–16 when Skiles was fired by general manager John Paxson on December 24, 2007.

=== Milwaukee Bucks (2008–2013) ===
On April 21, 2008, the Milwaukee Bucks signed their former player Skiles as team's new head coach. He led the Bucks to a 34–48 record in the 2008–09 season. Injuries to key players Michael Redd and Andrew Bogut marred the season, but Skiles was given a show of support by general manager John Hammond.

The next season Skiles had success with an improving, if still young, core led by Bogut at center and Brandon Jennings at point guard. A midseason trades for John Salmons and the pick-up of Jerry Stackhouse gave Skiles both a reliable shooter and a veteran presence on the Bucks' bench. Most NBA prognosticators picked the Bucks to finish last in the Eastern Conference, but the team's defense helped the Bucks beat several of the top teams in the NBA. After a gruesome injury to Bogut's right arm on April 3, 2010 Skiles coached his team to a decisive victory over the heavily favored Phoenix Suns. Three days later Skiles and the Bucks clinched a playoff berth by beating the Chicago Bulls in Chicago. They finished the regular season with a 46–36 mark, their first winning record in seven years. Skiles was frequently mentioned in NBA Coach of the Year talks, eventually finishing second to Oklahoma City Thunder head coach Scott Brooks.

Skiles' five-year stint in Milwaukee ended on January 8, 2013, when he and the Bucks mutually agreed to part ways.

=== Orlando Magic (2015–2016) ===
On May 29, 2015, former team point guard Skiles joined the Orlando Magic as the franchise's 12th head coach. On May 12, 2016, after head coaching the team for one season, Skiles stepped down as head coach of the Orlando Magic, claiming he was "not the right head coach" for the Magic.

== NBA career statistics ==
Legend
GP	Games played	GS	Games started	MPG	Minutes per game
FG%	Field goal percentage	3P%	3-point field goal percentage	FT%	Free throw percentage
RPG	Rebounds per game	APG	Assists per game	SPG	Steals per game
BPG	Blocks per game	PPG	Points per game	**Bold**	Career high

=== Regular season ===
Year	Team	GP	GS	MPG	FG%	3P%	FT%	RPG	APG	SPG	BPG	PPG
1986–87	Milwaukee	13	0	15.8	.290	.214	.833	2.0	3.5	0.4	**0.1**	3.8
1987–88	Indiana	51	2	14.9	.411	.300	.833	1.3	3.5	0.4	**0.1**	4.4
1988–89	Indiana	80	13	19.6	.448	.267	**.903**	1.9	4.9	0.8	0.0	6.8
1989–90	Orlando	70	32	20.9	.409	.394	.874	2.3	4.8	0.5	**0.1**	7.7
1990–91	Orlando	79	66	34.4	.445	.408	.902	3.4	8.4	**1.1**	**0.1**	**17.2**
1991–92	Orlando	75	63	31.7	.414	.364	.895	2.7	7.3	1.0	**0.1**	14.1
1992–93	Orlando	78	**78**	**39.6**	**.467**	.340	.892	**3.7**	**9.4**	**1.1**	0.0	15.4
1993–94	Orlando	**82**	46	28.1	.429	.412	.878	2.3	6.1	0.6	0.0	9.9
1994–95	Washington	62	62	33.5	.455	.421	.886	2.6	7.3	**1.1**	**0.1**	13.0
1995–96	Philadelphia	10	9	23.6	.351	**.441**	.800	1.6	3.8	0.7	0.0	6.3
Career		600	371	28.0	.435	.379	.889	2.5	6.5	0.8	0.0	11.1

=== Playoffs ===
Year	Team	GP	GS	MPG	FG%	3P%	FT%	RPG	APG	SPG	BPG	PPG
1994	Orlando	2	0	11.5	.500	.000	1.000	0.5	1.5	0.0	0.0	4.5
Career		2	0	11.5	.500	.000	1.000	0.5	1.5	0.0	0.0	4.5

== Head coaching record ==
Legend
Regular season	G	Games coached	W	Games won	L	Games lost	W–L %	Win–loss %
Playoffs	PG	Playoff games	PW	Playoff wins	PL	Playoff losses	PW–L %	Playoff win–loss %

Team	Year	G	W	L	W–L%	Finish	PG	PW	PL	PW–L%	Result
Phoenix	1999–00	62	40	22	.645	3rd in Pacific	9	4	5	.444	Lost in Conf. Semifinals
Phoenix	2000–01	82	51	31	.622	3rd in Pacific	4	1	3	.250	Lost in First round
Phoenix	2001–02	51	25	26	.490	(resigned)	—	—	—	—	—
Chicago	2003–04	66	19	47	.288	8th in Central	—	—	—	—	Missed Playoffs
Chicago	2004–05	82	47	35	.573	2nd in Central	6	2	4	.333	Lost in First round
Chicago	2005–06	82	41	41	.500	4th in Central	6	2	4	.333	Lost in First round
Chicago	2006–07	82	49	33	.598	3rd in Central	10	6	4	.600	Lost in Conf. Semifinals
Chicago	2007–08	25	9	16	.360	(fired)	—	—	—	—	—
Milwaukee	2008–09	82	34	48	.415	5th in Central	—	—	—	—	Missed Playoffs
Milwaukee	2009–10	82	46	36	.561	2nd in Central	7	3	4	.429	Lost in First round
Milwaukee	2010–11	82	35	47	.427	3rd in Central	—	—	—	—	Missed Playoffs
Milwaukee	2011–12	66	31	35	.470	3rd in Central	—	—	—	—	Missed Playoffs
Milwaukee	2012–13	32	16	16	.500	(resigned)	—	—	—	—	—
Orlando	2015–16	82	35	47	.427	5th in Southeast	—	—	—	—	Missed Playoffs
Career		958	478	480	.499		42	18	24	.429	

== See also ==
- List of National Basketball Association career free throw percentage leaders
- List of National Basketball Association players with most assists in a game
