= Northridge High School (Indiana) =

Location
- 56779 Northridge Drive; Middlebury, Indiana 46540; United States; 41°40′12″N 85°44′7″W

Information
- Type: Public high school
- Motto: Inspiring students to shape the world
- Established: 1969
- School district: Middlebury Community Schools
- Principal: Melissa Whitehead
- Teaching staff: 80.50 (FTE)
- Grades: 9–12
- Enrollment: 1,396 (2023–2024)
- Student to teacher ratio: 17.34
- Colors: Green and gold
- Athletics conference: Northern Lakes Conference
- Team name: Raiders
- Newspaper: OnSlate
- Yearbook: The Shield
- Feeder schools: Northridge Middle School
- Website: nhs.mcsin-k12.org

Northridge High School is a secondary school in Middlebury, Indiana, serving grades 9–12 for the Middlebury Community Schools.

== Statistics ==
In the 2020–21 school year, total enrollment was at 1,412 students.

In the 2020–21 school year the ethnicity breakdown was:

- White – 83.9%
- Hispanic – 11.1%
- Asian – 1.3%
- Black – 0.8%
- American-Indian – 0.2%
- Multi-racial – 2.5%

== Athletics ==
Northridge High School is part of the Indiana High School Athletic Association, which is a voluntary, non-profit organization available for any school in the state of Indiana accredited by the Indiana Department of Education. Northridge competes in boys basketball, football, baseball, wrestling, cross-country, track, swimming, tennis, golf, and soccer. Women can participate in basketball, volleyball, swimming, cross-country, track, soccer, tennis, softball, cheerleading, and golf.

- 1988 IHSAA State Champions: Softball
- 2004 IHSAA State Champions: Boys Cross Country

== Other programs ==
Northridge is a part of VEX Robotics and Indiana Technology Student Association (TSA).

== Notable alumni ==
- Eric Carpenter, soccer player
- Jordon Hodges, actor
- Joanna King, member of the Indiana House of Representatives

== See also ==
- List of high schools in Indiana
