= Plymouth High School (Indiana) =

Location
- 810 North Randolph Street; Plymouth, Indiana 46563; United States; 41.347405°N 86.302708°W

Information
- Type: Public high school
- School district: Plymouth Community School Corporation
- Superintendent: Mitch Mawhorter
- Principal: Jacob Singleton
- Faculty: 72.67 (FTE)
- Grades: 9–12
- Enrollment: 1034 (2026-27)
- Student to teacher ratio: 14.61
- Colors: Crimson and white
- Athletics conference: Northern Lakes Conference
- Team name: Rockies / Pilgrims
- Rivals: Warsaw Community High School
- Newspaper: Ye Pilgrim
- Website: www.plymouth.k12.in.us/o/phs

Plymouth High School is a four-year public high school located in Plymouth, Indiana, United States. The school serves ninth through twelfth grade and is the only high school for the Plymouth Community School Corp District in Marshall County.

== Demographics ==
Enrollment has stayed relatively steady for the last few years. During the 2020–21 school year, total enrollment was about 1,095 students, only dropping slightly to 1,034 by 2026. Graduation rate among those enrolled was at 85%. As of 2026, the school's student population is 0.1% Pacific Islander, 0.1% Native American, 1.1% black, 1.5% Asian, 1.5% multiracial, 28.6% Hispanic, and 67.1% white.

== Athletics ==
Plymouth High School's athletic teams are a part of the Northern Lakes Conference. There have been several standout students that shaped the school's athletic program.

Steve Yoder worked as Plymouth High School, first as an assistant basketball coach in 1964 before being promoted to head coach by 1967. He was named District One Coach of the Year after his final year at Plymouth in 1973. He would later become the head coach of University of Wisconsin–Madison's basketball program and work as a scout for the Indiana Pacers and the New York Knicks.

Several years later, Scott Skiles led the school to the IHSAA State Basketball Championship in 1982.

== Feeder schools ==
- Elementary schools
  - Jefferson Elementary School
  - Washington Discovery Academy
  - Menominee Elementary School
  - Webster Elementary School
- Intermediate schools
  - Riverside Intermediate
- Middle school
  - Lincoln Junior High School

== Notable alumni ==
- Clifford L. Linedecker, investigative journalist and author
- Scott Skiles, former NBA basketball player and coach
- Morgan Uceny, retired Olympic track and field athlete
- Josie Edwards, singer-songwriter
- Steve Yoder, former basketball head coach at University of Wisconsin–Madison, scout for Indiana Pacers and New York Knicks

== See also ==
- List of high schools in Indiana
