= Goshen High School (Indiana) =

Public school in Indiana, United States

Location
- 401 Lincolnway East; Goshen, Indiana 46526; United States; 41°34′50″N 85°49′23″W

Information
- Type: Public secondary school
- School district: Goshen Community Schools
- Superintendent: Jim DuBois
- Principal: Cathy DeMeyer
- Teaching staff: 110.83 (FTE)
- Grades: 9 to 12
- Enrollment: 2,041 (2023-2024)
- Student to teacher ratio: 18.42
- Colors: Red, white and grey
- Athletics conference: Northern Lakes Conference
- Nickname: RedHawks
- Newspaper: The Talon
- Website: www.goshenschools.org/ghs

Goshen High School is a public high school in Goshen, Indiana, United States. It serves grades 9–12 for Goshen Community Schools.

== Academics ==
Goshen High School has been accredited by the North Central Association, and its successors, since April 1, 1909.

In the 2019 U.S. News & World Report annual rankings, Goshen ranked 5,748th nationally and 132nd in Indiana.

== Demographics ==
The demographic breakdown of the 2,016 students enrolled for 2020-21 was:

- Male – 51.2%
- Female – 48.8%
- Native American/Alaskan – 0.05%
- Asian – 1.0%
- Black – 2.67%
- Hispanic – 56.2%
- White – 36.33%
- Multiracial – 3.7%

85.1% of the students were eligible for free or reduced-cost lunch. For 2020–21, Goshen was a Title I school.

== Athletics ==
Goshen's RedHawks compete in the Northern Lakes Conference of Indiana. School colors are red, white and grey. As of 2019, the following Indiana High School Athletic Association (IHSAA) sanctioned sports were offered:

- Baseball (boys)
- Basketball (girls and boys)
- Cross country (girls and boys)
- Football (boys)
  - State champion - 1978, 1988
- Unified flag football (coed)
- Golf (girls and boys)
- Soccer (girls and boys)
  - Boys state champion - 2014
- Softball (girls)
- Swim and dive (girls and boys)
- Tennis (girls and boys)
- Track and field (girls and boys)
- Unified track and field (coed)
- Volleyball (girls)
- Wrestling (boys)

=== Mascot ===
Goshen High School's school colors are red, white and grey. Before 2016, Goshen High School's mascot was the "Redskins" which featured a mascot wearing a Native American headdress. Beginning January 1, 2016, the school changed their mascot to the "Redhawks".

== Notable alumni ==
- Kate Bolduan – CNN correspondent
- Speed Kelly – Major League Baseball infielder
- Rick Mirer – NFL quarterback
- John Rarick – politician
- Derric Johnson - conductor, composer, author

=== Notable staff ===
- Bill Doba – former assistant football coach at Goshen, later head coach at Washington State University

== See also ==
- List of high schools in Indiana
