= Mishawaka High School =

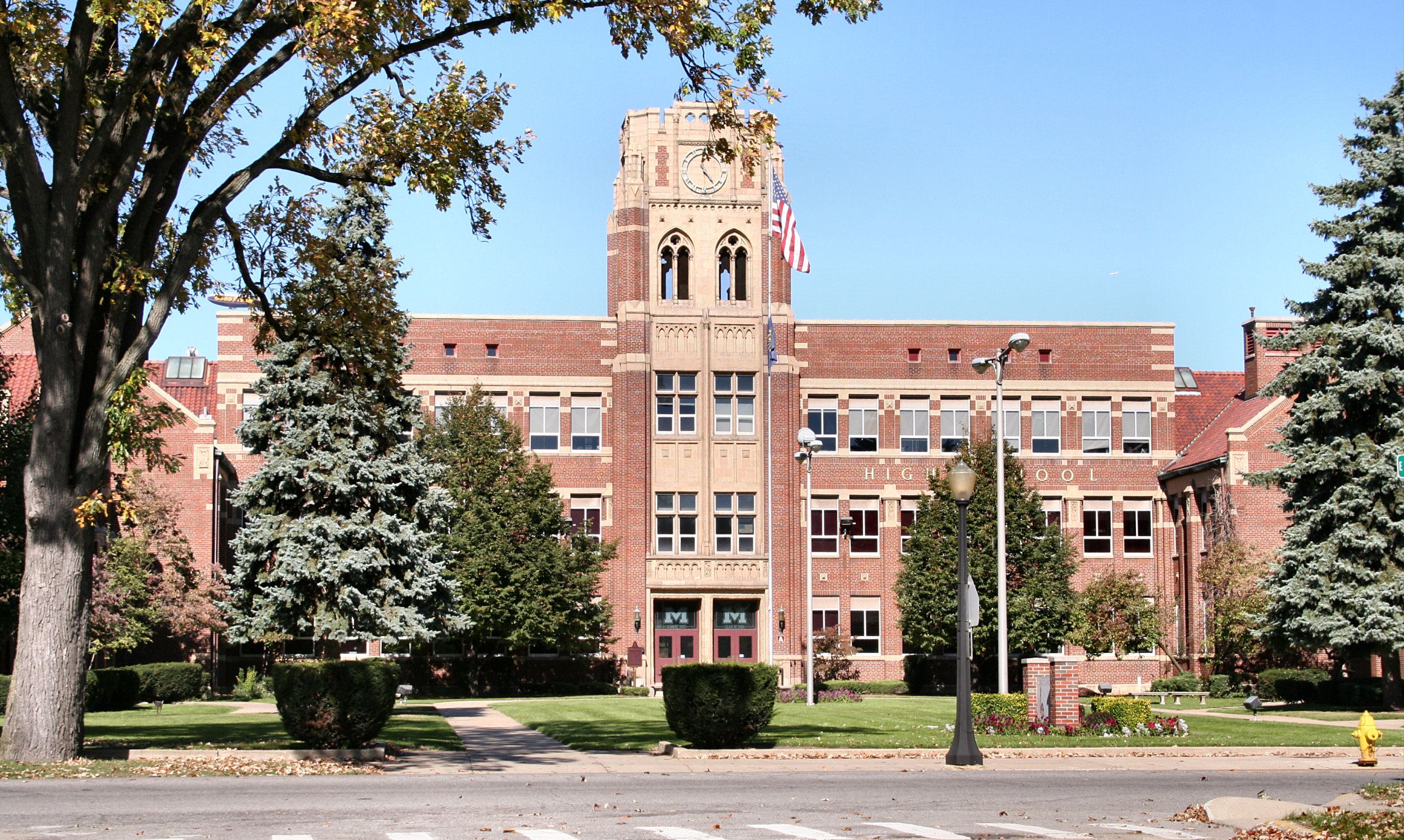

Location
- 1202 Lincoln Way East; Mishawaka, Indiana 46544; United States; 41°39′45″N 86°09′40″W

Information
- Type: Public high school
- Established: 1874
- School district: School City of Mishawaka
- Principal: Kadyn Oneal
- Teaching staff: 97.50 (on an FTE basis)
- Grades: 9–12
- Gender: Co-educational
- Enrollment: 1,437 (2023–2024)
- Student to teacher ratio: 14.74
- Hours in school day: 7
- Campus size: 16.3 acres (6.6 ha)
- Colors: Maroon and White
- Athletics conference: Northern Lakes Conference
- Mascot: Cavemen
- Nickname: Cavemen
- Rival: Penn High School
- Newspaper: Alltold
- Yearbook: Miskodeed
- Website: mhs.mishawakaschools.com

Mishawaka High School is a public high school located in Mishawaka, Indiana. The school educates students in grades 9–12 and is part of the School City of Mishawaka.

== History ==
The first Mishawaka High School was proposed by the Mishawaka Town Board in May, 1873. It was a three-story building located on the corner of Hill Street and West Second Street (now Lincoln Way West) on the site of the Main Junior High School playground at 301 Lincoln Way West. On the third floor was Whitson Hall, used only for entertainment and graduation exercises. Five rooms on the second, including two grade rooms and three other rooms, were used for high school. On the first floor, there were five other class rooms.

The first school board consisted of W. W. Butterworth and J. Q. C. VanDenbosh. Jacob Beal was the first principal and E. L. Hallock, the superintendent. The school had only six teachers, two of whom were students in attendance. The first class graduated in 1878.

The present Mishawaka High School was built by the Mishawaka Board of Education in 1924. It is a three-story building on Lincoln Way East between Wenger and Gernhart Streets covering four square blocks including the track and football field. The auditorium and cafeteria were built after the main part of the high school was occupied. The auditorium was finished in 1925, just in time for the seniors to present their play, and the cafeteria was completed only a few weeks before the summer vacation. The original gym was remodeled in 1959 to accommodate two full-sized gymnasium floors and provide a total seating capacity of 4,000. An additional wing was added in 1963 providing nine classrooms, a reading laboratory, a foreign language laboratory, a music room, and a study hall. The grounds were carefully planned by landscape gardeners before the building was built. The present shrubbery in the foreground of the building was a joint effort in graduating classes and the student council contributions. The gold letters, Mishawaka High School, were put on the front of the building in 1931.

The building and equipping of Mishawaka High School originally cost $800,000. The gym was remodeled in 1959 at a cost of approximately $600,000. The classroom wing built in 1963 cost $650,000 to construct and equip. The building and equipping of the stadium completed in 1939, cost approximately $130,000. The Board of Control provided approximately $55,000. toward in its construction and equipment. The Baldwin electric organ in the auditorium was given to the school in 1950 by the Lion's Club of Mishawaka, in memory of Mr. W. W. French. The entire school was rewired and fluorescent lighting added in 1953–1954 at a cost of $125,000.

A four-year renovation project (1976–1980) has resulted in an extensive modernization of the indoor and outdoor facilities of the high school. Major areas of improvement included the auditorium, the cafeteria, the gymnasium, the library, the administrative offices, the industrial education wing, the hallways, the classrooms, and the stadium. The total cost of the project was just under four million dollars.

In 1984, another phase of the Mishawaka High School remodeling and expansion was completed. Newly constructed and located between the cafeteria and the Industrial Education Department is a two-story addition that houses the Music Department on the first floor and classrooms on the second. The kitchen and cafeteria facilities were expanded.

In January, 1988, a new gym/pool complex was completed. Included in this facility are a wrestling room, a weight room, an all purpose room, and a 1/10 mile running track.

In fall of 1999 the science and technology wing was completed along with a new television studio., The new addition features eleven brand new science labs equipped with all the amenities necessary for conducting science class in the year 2000 and beyond.

The industrial technology portion of the facility houses a manufacturing lab where students learn about hydraulics, pneumatics, C-N-C lathes, and milling machines. The industrial technology wing also features a CAD (computer-aided design) lab where students are taught drafting skills with the aid of a computer. In the engineering lab the students learn to design buildings and community facilities. There is also a transportation lab where students learn about transportation of people and things on land, air, water, and rail. In the construction lab, students learn about each aspect of construction including foundations, framing, roof systems, and the materials used for various reasons such as climate and other purposes. The integrated lab melds all of the technologies from the other labs. As a result of the new construction, Mishawaka High School now totals 319,949 square feet (29,724.2 m^{2}) and sits on 16.36 acres (66,200 m^{2}).

== Demographics ==
The demographic breakdown of the 1,476 students enrolled in 2013–14 was:

- Male – 50.0%
- Female – 50.0%
- Native American/Alaskan – 0.7%
- Asian/Pacific islanders – 0.6%
- Black – 4.1%
- Hispanic – 6.4%
- White – 84.2%
- Multiracial – 4.0%

57.4% of the students were eligible for free or reduced lunch.

== Athletics ==
Mishawaka competes in the Northern Lakes Conference for athletics; the school was previously part of the Northern Indiana Athletic Conference. Their nickname is the Cavemen and the school colors are maroon and white. The following IHSAA sanctioned sports are offered at Mishawaka:

- Baseball (boys)
- Basketball (boys & girls)
- Cross country (boys & girls)
  - Boys state champion – 1946
- Football (boys)
- Golf (boys & girls)
- Soccer (boys & girls)
- Softball (girls)
- Swimming (boys & girls)
- Tennis (boys & girls)
- Track (boys & girls)
- Volleyball (girls)
  - State champion – 1980, 1983, 1988
- Wrestling (boys)
  - State champion – 1991, 2008, 2010

== Notable alumni ==
- Tom Roggeman – NFL Guard
- Achille "Chick" Maggioli – NFL defensive back and halfback
- Adam Driver – actor
- Anna Rohrer – long-distance runner
- Conte Candoli – jazz musician
- Freddie Fitzsimmons – MLB pitcher and manager
- George Gulyanics – NFL running back and punter
- Joy Lynn White – country western musician and composer
- Lisa Germano – folk and alternative rock musician and composer
- Liz Richardson – Red Cross volunteer and clubmobiler in WW2
- Pete Candoli – jazz musician
- Sharon Versyp – college women's basketball coach
- Donald Heirman – Electromagnetic compatibility expert and IEEE Life Fellow.

== See also ==
- List of high schools in Indiana
