= Mishawaka, Indiana =

- City
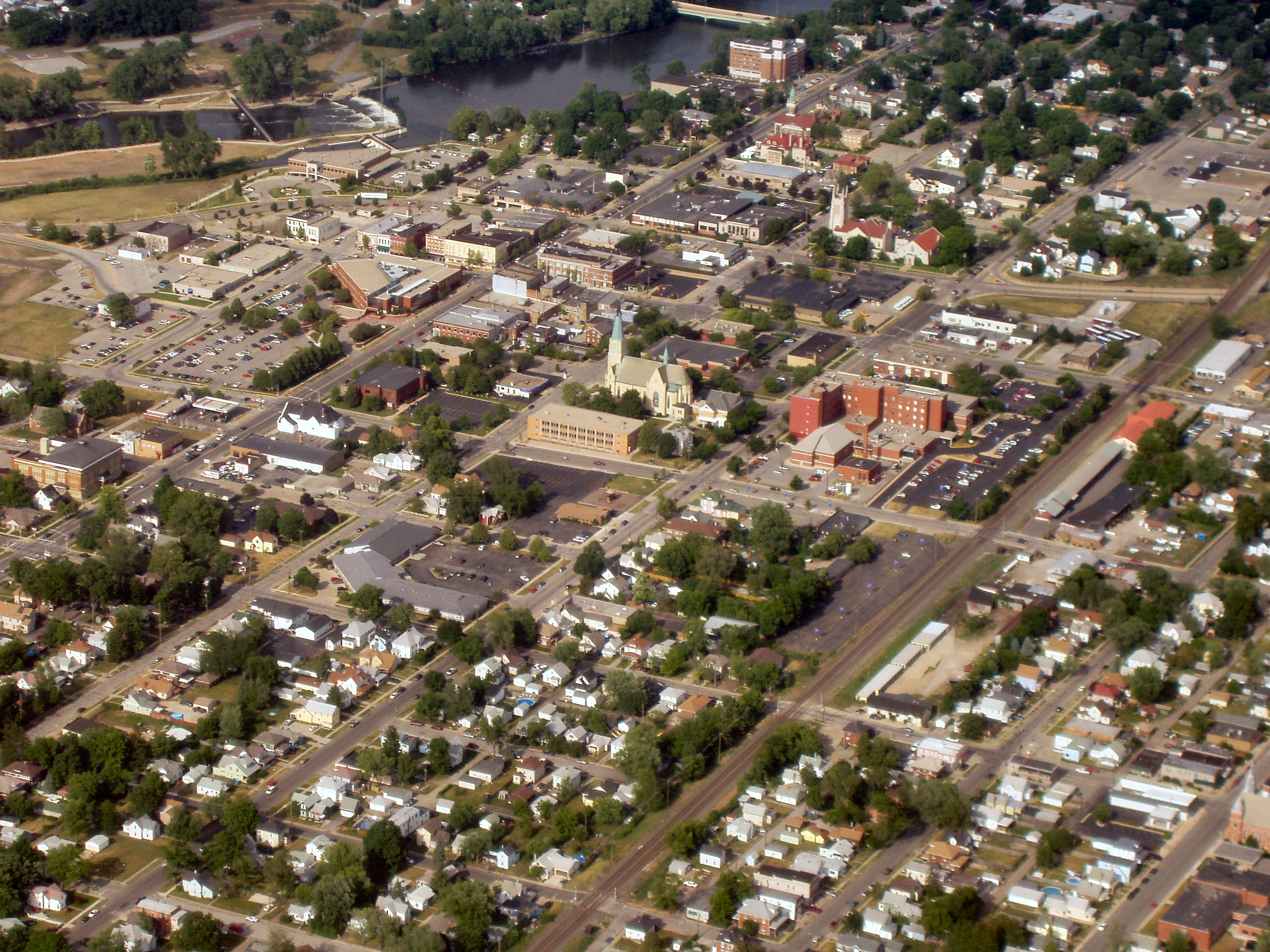
- Mishawaka downtown, looking north

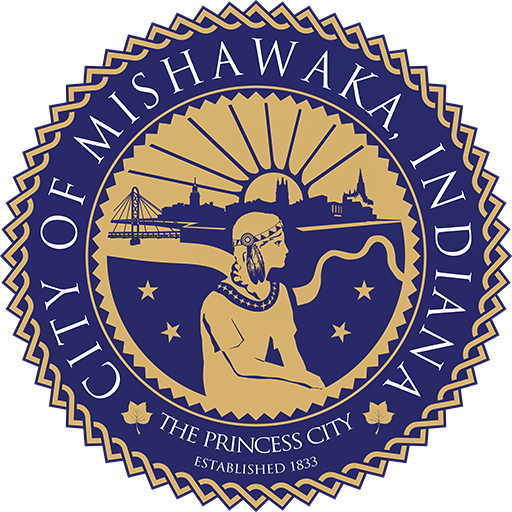
- Flag Seal
- Nicknames: The Princess City, The Mish
- Location of Mishawaka in St. Joseph County, Indiana
- Coordinates: 41°39′15″N 86°09′48″W
- Country: United States
- State: Indiana
- County: St. Joseph
- Townships: Penn, Clay, Harris
- Established: 1833

Government
  - Mayor: Dave Wood (R)

Area
  - Total: 18.25 sq mi (47.26 km^{2})
  - Land: 17.90 sq mi (46.35 km^{2})
  - Water: 0.35 sq mi (0.90 km^{2})
- Elevation: 738 ft (225 m)

Population (2020)
  - Total: 51,063
  - Density: 2,853.2/sq mi (1,101.61/km^{2})
- Time zone: UTC−5 (EST)
  - Summer (DST): UTC−4 (EDT)
- ZIP codes: 46544-46546
- Area code: 574
- FIPS code: 18-49932
- GNIS feature ID: 2395354
- Website: www.mishawaka.in.gov

Mishawaka (/ˌmɪʃəˈwɑːkə/) is a city on the St. Joseph River, in St. Joseph County, Indiana, United States. The population was 51,063 as of the 2020 census. Its nickname is "the Princess City". Mishawaka is a principal city of the South Bend-Mishawaka metropolitan area.

== History ==
Mishawaka's recorded history began with the discovery of bog iron deposits at the beginning of the 1830s. Settlers arriving to mine the deposits founded the town of St. Joseph Iron Works in 1831. Within a few years, the town had a blast furnace, a general store, a tavern, and about 200 residents. Business prospered, and in 1833 St. Joseph Iron Works, Indiana City, and two other adjacent small towns were incorporated to form the city of Mishawaka.

The Mishawaka post office has been in operation since 1833.

On June 27, 1859, a bridge carrying a train, which had over 150 people on board, collapsed, killing 60.

In September 1872, a fire destroyed three quarters of Mishawaka's business district. However, the citizens rebuilt and attracted new industry. The Dodge Manufacturing Company, Perkins Windmills and the Mishawaka Woolen and Rubber Company (later Ball Band, then Uniroyal) all helped the town to prosper. Mishawaka grew through both industry and agriculture. In the late 19th century, Mishawaka became known as the "Peppermint Capital of the World", as its rich black loam produced great quantities of mint.

From 1906 to 1915, Mishawaka was the manufacturing home of the luxurious American Simplex motor car. Ball Band made rubber garments and was hit by a major strike in 1931. It flourished in the 1940s, finally closing in 1997 in the face of cheaper imports. Manufacturing in Mishawaka peaked in the 1940s and began a slow decline due to industrial restructuring. The economic base shifted to retail services and small industry.

In 1979, University Park Mall opened in the far northern portion of Mishawaka. In 1990, AM General began producing the Hummer in its Mishawaka plant. The MV-1 is a purpose-built taxicab and replaces the planned Standard Taxi; it was developed in collaboration with AM General. The car is built in Mishawaka at an AM General plant. AM General has begun making Mercedes vehicles at this plant since 2015.

=== Names ===
One theory for the word Mishawaka proposes that it derives from the name of a Potawatomi village at the junction of the Elkhart and St. Joseph rivers, where there were many dead trees. The village's exact name in the Potawatomi language may have been *mšwakig ("at the firewood-tree land"). In the Miami-Illinois language, which historically was also spoken in the area, the corresponding placename is mihswaahkwahkiki ("it is firewood-tree land").

The most probable origin of the word comes from the city's government website, where in a history of Mishawaka paper written by local historian Peter DeKever states, "The Potawatomi had numerous villages in the region, including one on the south bank of the St. Joseph River located in the area bounded today by Lincolnway West and North Main and West Streets. The Potawatomi were drawn to this location by the ease of transport the river provided, a ford near a natural rapids, abundant fish and game, and access to timber. Their term for the area, M’Shehwahkeek, translates as swift flowing water or heavy timbered rapids." This theory is also mentioned by The History Museum of South Bend, and other sources.

The nickname "Princess City", however, derives from a different account of the name's origin. According to this story, "Mishawaka" or something similar was the name of the daughter of a Shawnee chief named "Elkhart". A love triangle between Mishawaka, a white trader named "Dead Shot", and a Shawnee warrior named "Grey Wolf" led to various adventures. This story originated with Flavius J. Littlejohn, a Michigan author, politician and judge, who published a collection of stories in 1875; in Littlejohn's account, the woman's name was "Mishawaha". Despite the story being completely fictional, it became popular and helped foster the legend that is known to this day. Even though the story is from a work of fiction, many residents believe Princess Mishawaka was real because of a "symbolic grave marker" of her erected by the Daughters of the American Revolution to promote the centennial of the city of Mishawaka in 1932. Lack of context has led to many believing that the site is the actual grave of the princess, and that the legend was true. In many ways, Princess Mishawaka represents a mascot for the city.

== Geography ==
According to the 2010 census, Mishawaka has a total area of 17.348 square miles (44.93 km^{2}), of which 17 square miles (44.03 km^{2}), or 97.99%, is land and 0.348 square miles (0.90 km^{2}), or 2.01%, is water.

== Demographics ==
Historical population
Census	Pop.	Note	%±
1850	1,412		—
1860	1,488		5.4%
1870	2,617		75.9%
1880	2,640		0.9%
1890	3,371		27.7%
1900	5,560		64.9%
1910	11,886		113.8%
1920	15,195		27.8%
1930	28,630		88.4%
1940	28,298		−1.2%
1950	32,918		16.3%
1960	33,361		1.3%
1970	36,060		8.1%
1980	40,201		11.5%
1990	42,608		6.0%
2000	46,557		9.3%
2010	48,252		3.6%
2020	51,063		5.8%
Source: US Census Bureau

=== 2020 census ===
As of the 2020 census, Mishawaka had a population of 51,063. The median age was 36.2 years. 20.8% of residents were under the age of 18 and 16.7% of residents were 65 years of age or older. For every 100 females there were 91.2 males, and for every 100 females age 18 and over there were 88.0 males age 18 and over.

99.7% of residents lived in urban areas, while 0.3% lived in rural areas.

There were 23,319 households in Mishawaka, of which 24.9% had children under the age of 18 living in them. Of all households, 31.7% were married-couple households, 23.8% were households with a male householder and no spouse or partner present, and 35.5% were households with a female householder and no spouse or partner present. About 39.9% of all households were made up of individuals and 14.3% had someone living alone who was 65 years of age or older.

There were 25,365 housing units, of which 8.1% were vacant. The homeowner vacancy rate was 1.3% and the rental vacancy rate was 9.1%.

Racial composition as of the 2020 census
Race	Number	Percent
White	39,414	77.2%
Black or African American	4,857	9.5%
American Indian and Alaska Native	222	0.4%
Asian	1,440	2.8%
Native Hawaiian and Other Pacific Islander	22	0.0%
Some other race	1,056	2.1%
Two or more races	4,052	7.9%
Hispanic or Latino (of any race)	3,104	6.1%

=== 2010 census ===
As of the census of 2010, there were 48,252 people, 21,343 households, and 11,730 families residing in the city. The population density was 2,838.4 inhabitants per square mile (1,095.9/km^{2}). There were 24,088 housing units at an average density of 1,416.9 per square mile (547.1/km^{2}). The racial makeup of the city was 86.1% White, 6.9% African American, 0.4% Native American, 1.9% Asian, 0.1% Pacific Islander, 1.6% from other races, and 2.9% from two or more races. Hispanic or Latino of any race were 4.5% of the population.

There were 21,343 households, of which 28.2% had children under the age of 18 living with them, 35.5% were married couples living together, 14.4% had a female householder with no husband present, 5.1% had a male householder with no wife present, and 45.0% were non-families. 37.4% of all households were made up of individuals, and 12.4% had someone living alone who was 65 years of age or older. The average household size was 2.21 and the average family size was 2.92.

The median age in the city was 34.7 years. 23.1% of residents were under the age of 18; 11.4% were between the ages of 18 and 24; 28.3% were from 25 to 44; 23.7% were from 45 to 64; and 13.6% were 65 years of age or older. The gender makeup of the city was 47.1% male and 52.9% female.

=== 2000 census ===
As of 2000 the median income for a household in the city was $33,986, and the median income for a family was $41,947. Males had a median income of $33,878 versus $23,672 for females. The per capita income for the city was $18,434. About 7.3% of families and 9.9% of the population were below the poverty line, including 11.7% of those under age 18 and 7.3% of those age 65 or over.

== Culture ==
Old-fashioned neighborhoods are found across the city. Many of the newer residential subdivisions that have been developed within the city in recent years have adopted design guidelines to produce the "hometown" neighborhood feel and encourage community spirit.

The city continually upgrades and develops new neighborhood park and recreation facilities. A total of 29 parks allow Mishawaka residents to golf, play ball, fish and exercise. In 1968, the city opened an outdoor Olympic-size swimming pool and an adjacent ice skating rink at Merrifield Park. On the south side, Mishawaka's George Wilson Park is home to the city's most popular winter toboggan spot, as well as an 18-hole frisbee golf course. Some of the city's Italian immigrants and their descendants still play traditional games such as bocce. A number of residents of Belgian descent play traditional Rolle Bolle and a few ethnic Belgians continue to raise and race homing pigeons. The city also hosted the nation's oldest and largest wiffleball tournament, the World Wiffle Ball Championship, from 1980 to 2012 and again in 2020.

The city's three high schools (Mishawaka High School, Penn High School, and Marian High School) have won a combined 11 state championships in football since 1920.

== Transportation ==
Mishawaka is served by TRANSPO municipal bus system, which also serves South Bend and several smaller suburbs in South Bend-Mishawaka metropolitan region. The Interurban Trolley's Bittersweet/Mishawaka route stops at Martin's Supermarket, connecting riders to the city of Elkhart and the town of Osceola. The closest Amtrak station and the closest commercial airport are both located in western South Bend. Amtrak also has a stop in Elkhart which is a bit closer.

=== Major highways ===
- Indiana Toll Road, which is Interstate 80 and Interstate 90.
- U.S. Route 20
- Indiana State Road 23
- Indiana State Road 331
- Indiana State Road 933

== Education ==
=== Public schools ===
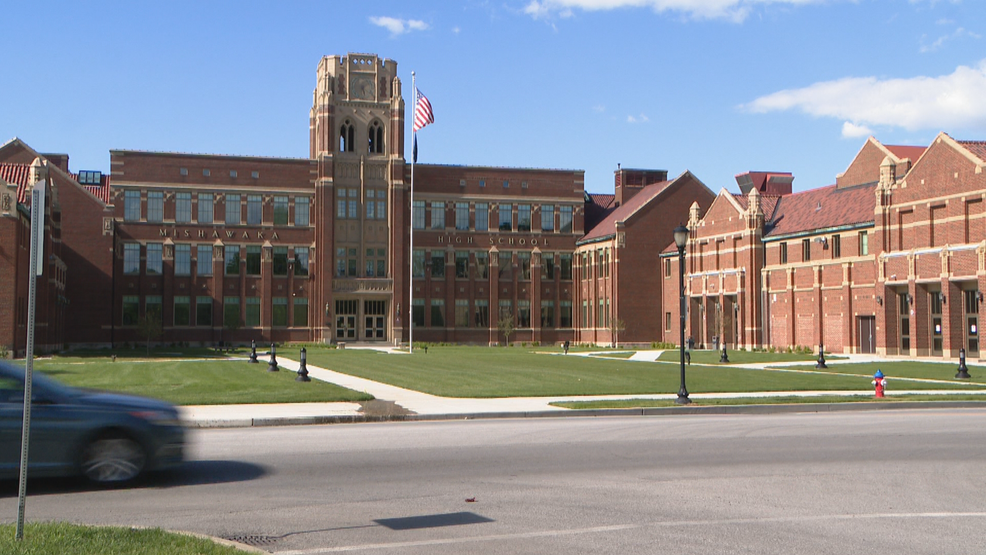
Mishawaka High School, of the School City of Mishawaka

Public schools located in and/or serving Mishawaka are operated by several school districts. School City of Mishawaka serves the central part of the city. Other sections are within the Penn-Harris-Madison School Corporation and the South Bend Community School Corporation. Mishawaka High School is the sole high school of the Mishawaka school district. School City of Mishawaka (School District of Mishawaka) contains a total of 9 Schools including 2 secondary Schools: Mishawaka High and John Young Middle School, and 7 Elementary Schools which includes the following: Battell, Beiger, Emmons, Hums, LaSalle, Liberty, and Twin Branch.

Penn-Harris elementary schools serving sections of Mishawaka include Walt Disney (in the Mishawaka city limits), Elm Road, Meadow's Edge, Prairie Vista, and Elsie Rogers; the middle schools respectively are Schmucker and Grissom. Penn High School, outside of the city limits, is the sole public high school of the Penn-Harris-Madison school district. Aside from Walt Disney Elementary, none of the other respective schools are in the Mishawaka city limits. The school zonings for the South Bend School Corporation area are as follows (none of the schools are in Mishawaka): Darden Elementary School Edison Middle School and Adams High School. The section was in 2020 zoned to Tarkington Elementary, which closed in 2021.

=== Private and tertiary education, and libraries ===
The Roman Catholic Diocese of Fort Wayne-South Bend operates four private Catholic schools in Mishawaka, including Marian High School.

Bethel University is an accredited evangelical Christian liberal arts school with 1,700 students.

Mishawaka has a public library, a branch of the Mishawaka-Penn-Harris Public Library system.

== Media ==
One major daily newspaper serving the South Bend and Mishawaka metro area, the South Bend Tribune. It is distributed in north central Indiana and southwestern Michigan.

Mishawaka has a wide variety of local radio broadcast available in the area. Stations' programming content contains a wide variety including public radio, classical music, religious, country, and urban contemporary among others. For more information, see List of Radio Stations in Mishawaka, Indiana.

As of 2013, the South Bend-Mishawaka-Elkhart designated market area was the 95th largest in the United States, with 319,860 homes (representing 0.3% of the US population). Most of the major television networks have affiliates in the Michiana area.

Mishawaka located stations include WSBT-TV (CBS), WBND-LD (ABC), WCWW-LD (CW) and WMYS-LD (My Network TV). Stations located in nearby South Bend, IN include WNDU-TV (NBC), WNIT-TV (PBS) and WHME-TV (LeSEA).

== Notable people ==
- Sarah Evans Barker — judge
- Remo Belli — creator of Remo Drum Heads
- Kyle Bornheimer — actor
- John Brademas — politician
- Conte Candoli — jazz musician (played trumpet in Doc Severinsen's The Tonight Show Band)
- Pete Candoli — jazz musician (played trumpet in Woody Herman's Big Band)
- Devin Cannady — professional basketball player
- Timothy J. DeGeeter — politician
- Adam Driver — actor
- Norman Eddy — Indiana Secretary of State
- Tom Ehlers — NFL football player
- Buddy Emmons — pedal steel guitarist
- Freddie Fitzsimmons — Major League Baseball pitcher and manager
- Todd A. Fonseca — author
- Daniel L. Gard — Navy chaplain
- Lisa Germano — musician
- Ben Goldwasser — keyboardist
- Kevin Gosztola — journalist, writer, documentarian
- George Gulyanics — professional football player (Chicago Bears)
- Robin Hood — LPGA Tour golfer
- Zander Horvath — Former NFL running back
- Charles Kuhl — World War II soldier, famous for being slapped by General Patton, which led to Patton losing his command
- Allan Lane — actor
- Liz Richardson — Red Cross Volunteer
- Chick Maggioli — professional football player
- Ruth McKenney — author
- Lou Mihajlovich — professional football player
- William J. Oliver — contractor
- Anna Rohrer — long-distance runner
- Mike Rosenthal — NFL offensive lineman
- Irene Vernon — actress
- Sharon Versyp — Purdue women's basketball coach
- Joy Lynn White — country western musician

== Points of interest ==
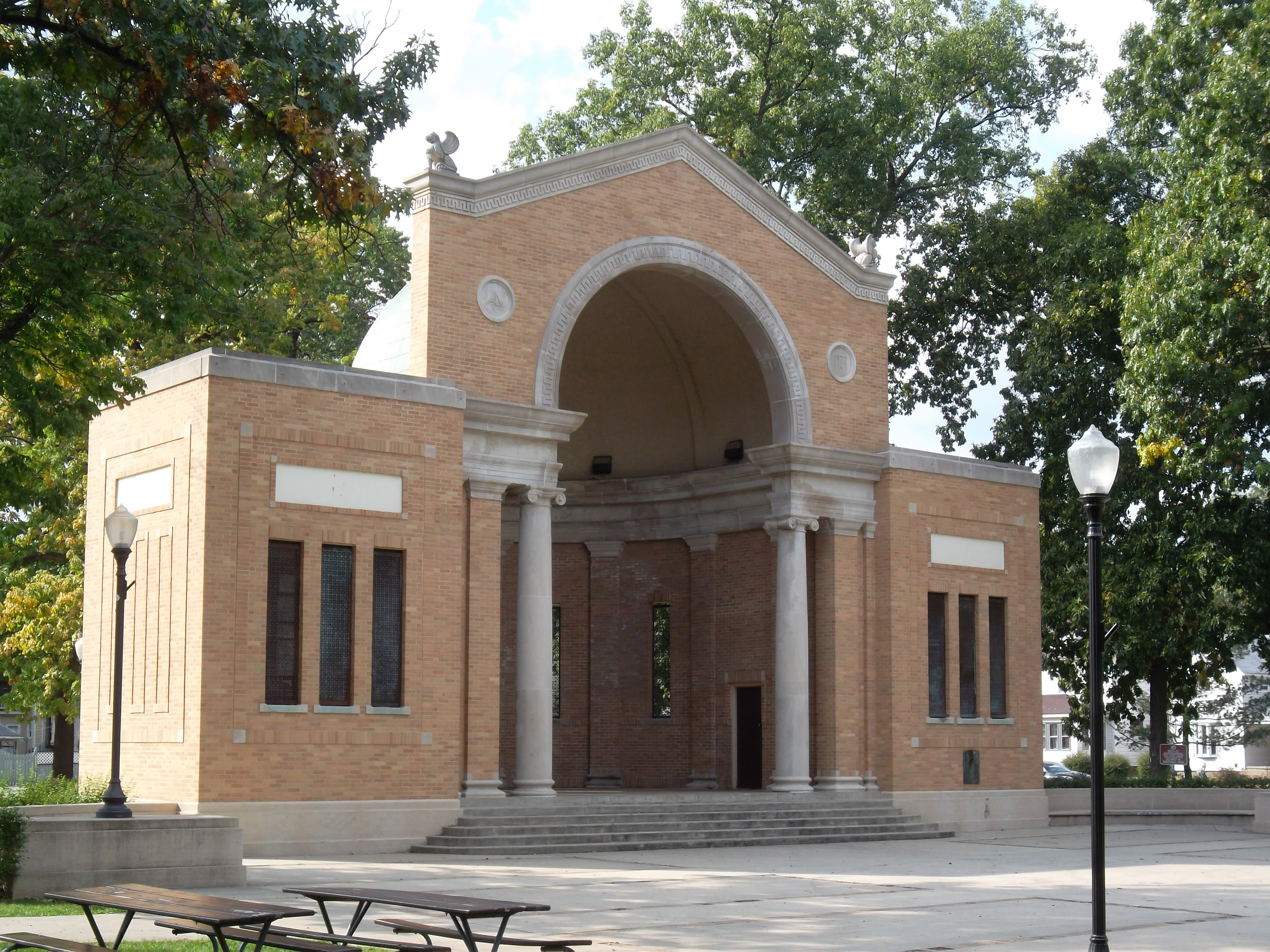
The Battell Park Historic District is one of nine sites in Mishawaka listed on the National Register of Historic Places.

- Beutter Park - The new park includes a river race with elliptical-shaped overlook weirs and fiber-optic underwater lighting, two connecting bridges across the St. Joseph River race to the park, the Mishawaka Riverwalk, the "Shards" sculpture, and an 800-foot perennial garden.
- Battell Park Historic District, has Classical Revival style Band Shell and a WPA-built terraced rock garden.
- Old Mishawaka Carnegie Library on N. Hill St - closed as a library in 1969 and is now a restaurant.
- Shiojiri Garden, located in Merrifield Park, is a Japanese strolling garden that symbolizes the Sister-City relationship between Mishawaka and Shiojiri City, Japan.
- The Beiger Mansion, built in 1903 and restored in 1973, was gutted by arson in 1974. The building has since been renovated. It is operated as a bed-and-breakfast and events facility.
- The Otis R. Bowen Museum, located on the campus of Bethel College, houses memorabilia and artifacts related to Dr. Otis Bowen's years as Governor of Indiana and Secretary of Health and Human Services. It has a copy of the Otis Bowen bust.
- In addition to the Battell Park Historic District, Beiger Mansion, and Old Mishawaka Carnegie Library, the Dodge House, Eller-Hosford House, Ellis-Schindler House, Kamm and Schellinger Brewery, Merrifield-Cass House, and Normain Heights Historic District are listed on the National Register of Historic Places. The Tivoli Theater, demolished in 2005, was formerly listed.

== International sister cities ==
- Soest, Germany
- Shiojiri, Japan

== See also ==
- South Bend, Indiana, twin city to Mishawaka
