= Concord High School (Indiana) =

Location
- 59117 Minuteman Way; Elkhart, Indiana 46517; United States
- 41°38′1″N 85°55′38″W

Information
- Type: Public high school
- Established: 1926
- School district: Concord Community Schools
- Superintendent: Dan Funston
- Principal: Jeffrey Petty
- Teaching staff: 96.83 (FTE)
- Grades: 9–12
- Enrollment: 1,735 (2023–2024)
- Student to teacher ratio: 17.92
- Colors: Kelly green and white
- Nickname: Minutemen
- Website: www.concord.k12.in.us/concord-high-school

Concord High School is a public high school in Dunlap, a census-designated place in Elkhart County, Indiana, United States.

It serves Dunlap, small sections of southern Elkhart and a small section of northern Goshen.

== Statistics ==
In the 2023–24 school year, total enrollment is at 1,735 students.

Concord High School has a diverse student population with Hispanic being the largest minority population. In the 2021–22 school year the ethnicity breakdown was:

- White – 44.0%
- Hispanic – 41.5%
- Black – 7.9%
- Asian – 1.0%
- Multi-racial – 5.4%

== History ==
The school was host to President Barack Obama's first order of business meeting outside of Washington, D.C., as well as the site of one of his campaign rallies before the 2008 election.

== Music ==
Concord's music department includes several choirs, two string orchestras, three jazz bands, three concert bands, one of the largest pep bands in the area, and a championship marching band.

The marching band is known as the Concord Marching Minutemen. Since the inception of the ISSMA marching band state finals in 1983, the band has only failed to qualify for the state championship twice, in 2000 and again in 2019. The band holds ISSMA Class B state championship titles from 1992, 2003, 2005, 2011 and 2015. The book "American Band" by Kristen Laine follows the Marching Minutemen through their 2004 state runner-up season.

The marching band has appeared in the Rose Bowl, Fiesta Bowl, and Orange Bowl parades and was in the Macy's Thanksgiving Day Parade in 1974, 1978, 1985, 1992, 1997, 2007, and 2013.

Concord High School was the first high school recognized by Conn-Selmer as an All-American school, an award to "recognize the most outstanding high school instrumental music programs in America."

== Athletics ==
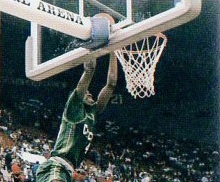
Shawn Kemp, pictured as a member of the boys' varsity basketball team, would go on to be a six-time NBA All-Star and a three-time All-NBA Second Team member.

Concord High School offers various sports, including football, cross country, golf, tennis, soccer, basketball, wrestling, swimming, track and field, baseball, lacrosse, and hockey for boys, and volleyball, cross country, soccer, tennis, cheerleading, swimming, track and field, softball, and lacrosse for girls.

Concord's athletic teams compete in the Northern Lakes Conference and in the 5A classification, competing in Sectional 10 in football and Sectional 4 in all other class sports.

== Drama department ==
Concord's drama department produces a straight play and a musical in November and March, respectively, held in the Beickman Performing Arts Center.

== Notable alumni ==
- Jordan Burt, former professional soccer player in the USL Championship
- Dairese Gary, former NCAA basketball player for the New Mexico Lobos men's basketball team
- Franko House, former basketball player and American football tight end
- Shawn Kemp, former NBA basketball player for the Seattle SuperSonics, Cleveland Cavaliers, Portland Trail Blazers and Orlando Magic.
- Jason Spriggs, former National Football League offensive lineman for the Green Bay Packers, Chicago Bears, and Atlanta Falcons; selected by the Packers in the 2nd round of the 2016 NFL draft
- Emory Tate, chess international master and father of Andrew Tate

== See also ==
- List of high schools in Indiana
