= List of United States tornadoes from June to August 2019 =

United States tornadoes from June to August 2019
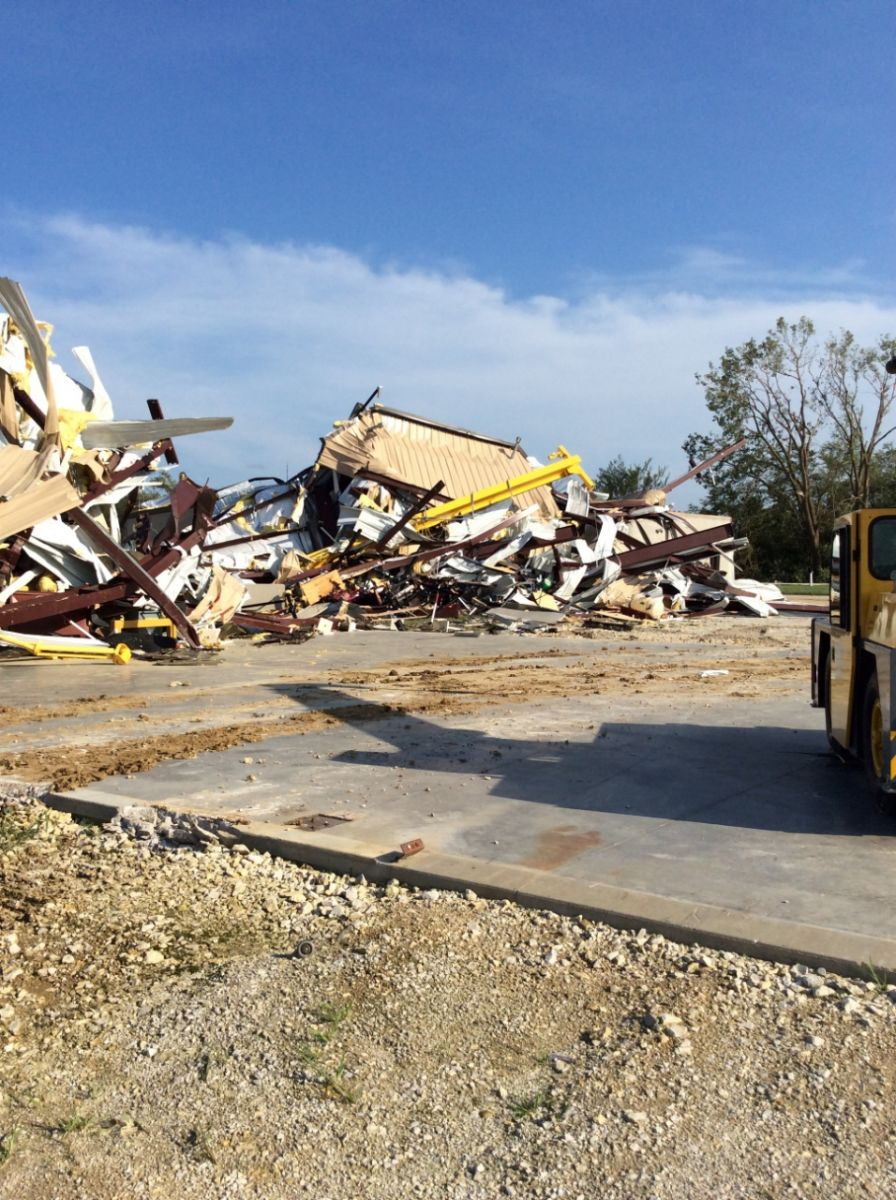
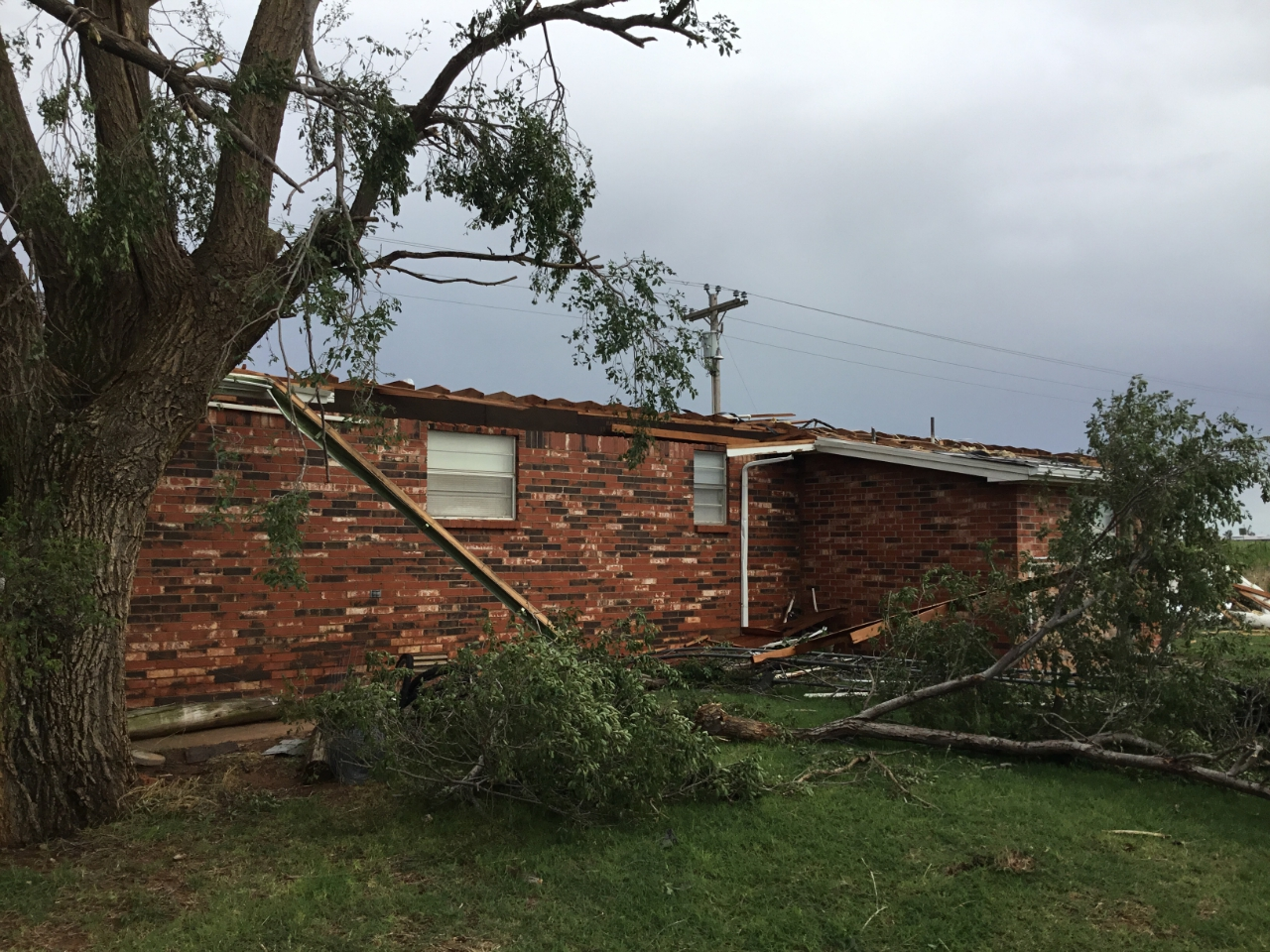
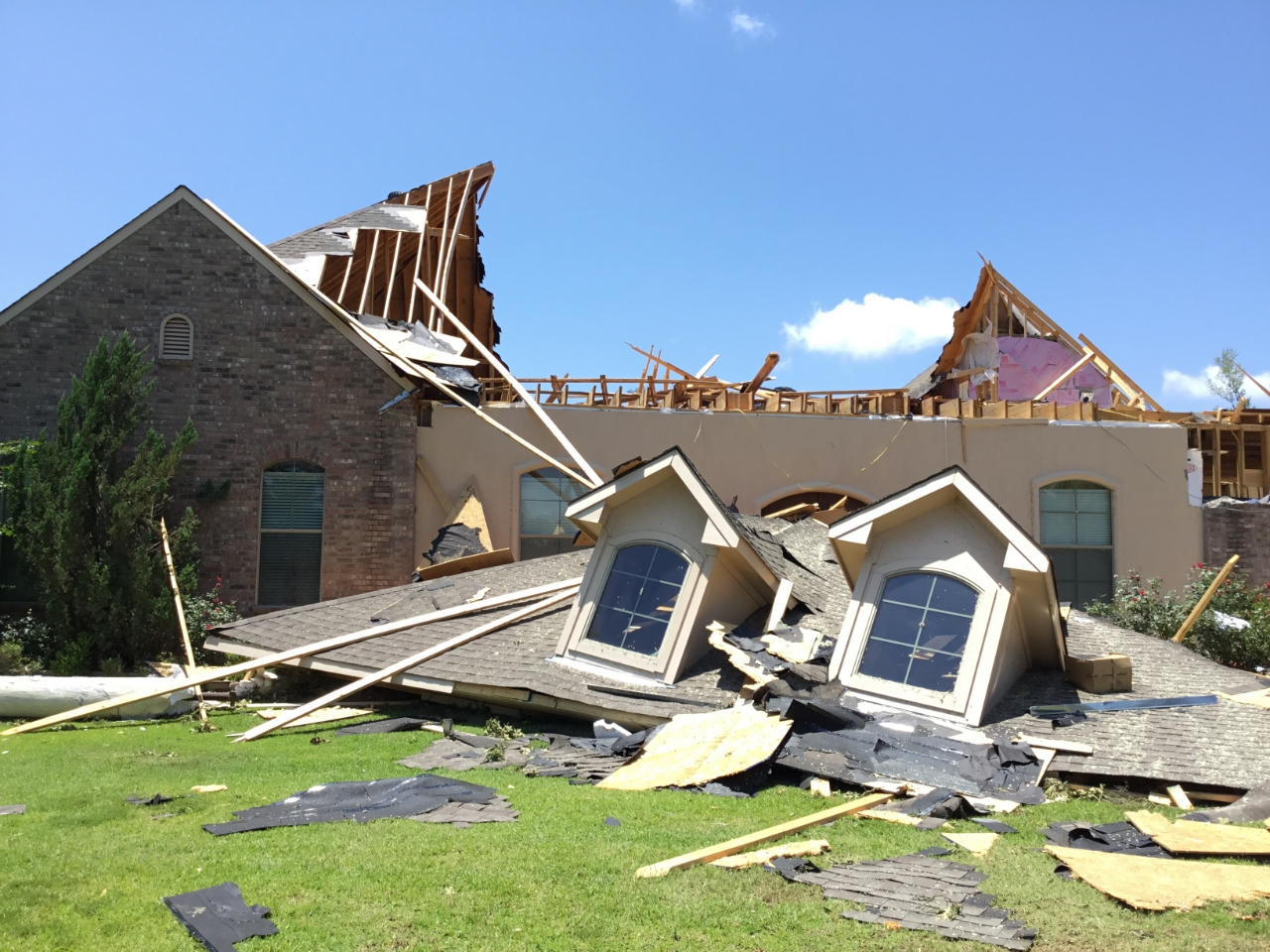
- Clockwise from top: A metal building system destroyed by an EF3 tornado in Warren County, Iowa on August 20; The roof of a home northwest of Benton, Louisiana torn off after an EF2 tornado on June 19; EF2 damage to a home near Custer City, Oklahoma following a tornado on June 15.
- Timespan: June 1 – August 29
- Maximum rated tornado: EF3 tornado: Warren County, Iowa on August 20
- Tornadoes: 358
- Fatalities: 0
- Injuries: 13

This page documents all tornadoes confirmed by various weather forecast offices of the National Weather Service in the United States in June 2019.

== United States yearly total ==
Confirmed tornadoes by Enhanced Fujita rating
EFU	EF0	EF1	EF2	EF3	EF4	EF5	Total
179	655	540	119	33	3	0	1,529

== June ==
Confirmed tornadoes by Enhanced Fujita rating
EFU	EF0	EF1	EF2	EF3	EF4	EF5	Total
26	77	67	10	0	0	0	180

=== June 1 event ===
List of confirmed tornadoes – Saturday, June 1, 2019 (Note: All dates are based on the local time zone where the tornado touched down; however, all times are in Coordinated Universal Time for consistency.)
EF#	Location	County / Parish	State	Start Coord.	Time (UTC)	Path length	Max width
EF0	SSW of Frenchglen	Harney	OR	42.66°N 119.00°W	19:17–19:31	1.29 mi (2.08 km)	10 yd (9.1 m)
EF0	The public reported a tornado that caused no known damage.						

=== June 2 event ===
List of confirmed tornadoes – Sunday, June 2, 2019
EF#	Location	County / Parish	State	Start Coord.	Time (UTC)	Path length	Max width
EF0	W of Duran	Torrance	NM	34.4808°N 105.559°W	20:27–20:42	4.22 mi (6.79 km)	50 yd (46 m)
EF0	An off-duty National Weather Service employee reported a tornado.						
EF0	SSE of Bone	Bingham	ID	43.25°N 111.7931°W	21:48–22:00	1 mi (1.6 km)	45 yd (41 m)
EF0	A tornado remained over open land without any surveyed damage.						
EF0	ENE of Bakersfield	Kern	CA	35.32°N 118.76°W	00:19–00:22	0.2 mi (0.32 km)	50 yd (46 m)
EF0	The tornado touched down in a rural area.						
EFU	SSW of Burlington	Kit Carson	CO	39.18°N 102.31°W	01:00	0.05 mi (0.080 km)	100 yd (91 m)
EFU	A storm chaser reported a brief tornado along a gust front.						
EF0	WSW of Boise City	Cimarron	OK	36.65°N 102.76°W	01:18	0.01 mi (0.016 km)	20 yd (18 m)
EF0	An NWS employee reported a landspout tornado.						

=== June 3 event ===
List of confirmed tornadoes – Monday, June 3, 2019
EF#	Location	County / Parish	State	Start Coord.	Time (UTC)	Path length	Max width
EF0	W of Padroni	Logan	CO	40.76°N 103.33°W	00:09–00:10	0.01 mi (0.016 km)	25 yd (23 m)
EF0	The public reported a landspout tornado in an open field. No damage was observed.						
EF0	W of Hagerman	Chaves	NM	33.0868°N 104.6348°W	00:10–00:15	1.38 mi (2.22 km)	50 yd (46 m)
EF0	A storm chaser reported a rain-wrapped tornado.						
EF0	WNW of Ulysses	Grant	KS	37.6173°N 101.4426°W	00:13–00:16	0.65 mi (1.05 km)	60 yd (55 m)
EF0	Numerous people videoed a landspout tornado.						
EFU	S of Kanorado	Sherman	KS	39.258°N 102.024°W	00:53	0.01 mi (0.016 km)	50 yd (46 m)
EFU	A trained storm spotter reported a brief tornado.						
EFU	N of Goodland	Sherman	KS	39.4119°N 101.7064°W	01:07–01:13	1.56 mi (2.51 km)	50 yd (46 m)
EFU	The public reported a landspout tornado.						

=== June 4 event ===
List of confirmed tornadoes – Tuesday, June 4, 2019
EF#	Location	County / Parish	State	Start Coord.	Time (UTC)	Path length	Max width
EF1	Southern Rochester	Olmsted	MN	43.9867°N 92.4923°W	22:48–22:52	1.25 mi (2.01 km)	75 yd (69 m)
EF1	Numerous trees were damaged in the southern part of Rochester. One home had a portion of its roof lifted off.						
EF1	S of La Luz	Otero	NM	32.9431°N 105.9492°W	22:54–22:57	0.31 mi (0.50 km)	60 yd (55 m)
EF1	A mobile home was completely destroyed, injuring the occupant, and three other residences were damaged by flying debris. Several outbuildings, including sheds and barns, were heavily damaged or destroyed. One in particular was shifted off its foundation and moved about 9 ft (2.7 m). A metal silo was also lifted off its foundation and tossed about 400 ft (120 m) before landing in one of the homes.						
EF0	SSW of Hope	Eddy	NM	32.5994°N 104.8287°W	23:45–23:46	0.05 mi (0.080 km)	20 yd (18 m)
EF0	A brief tornado remained over open fields without causing damage.						

=== June 5 event ===
List of confirmed tornadoes – Wednesday, June 5, 2019
EF#	Location	County / Parish	State	Start Coord.	Time (UTC)	Path length	Max width
EF0	SE of Grelton	Henry	OH	41.3096°N 83.9418°W	18:10–18:12	0.4 mi (0.64 km)	10 yd (9.1 m)
EF0	The eastern section of a pole barn's roof was lifted and tossed. A power line and power pole were damaged. Corn crops were damaged.						
EF0	Northern Galion	Crawford	OH	40.7426°N 82.7876°W	20:57–20:59	1.18 mi (1.90 km)	50 yd (46 m)
EF0	A tornado moved through the northern sections of Galion, snapping trees and inflicting minor damage to an outbuilding as well as properties.						
EF1	Northern Frazeysburg	Muskingum	OH	40.1462°N 82.1611°W	22:26–22:32	2.82 mi (4.54 km)	50 yd (46 m)
EF1	One barn was completely destroyed while a second lost its roof and was shifted off its foundation. A home and a shed suffered roof damage. Large trees were uprooted as well.						
EF0	SE of Creole	Cameron	LA	29.7847°N 93.0991°W	02:40–02:42	0.22 mi (0.35 km)	50 yd (46 m)
EF0	Half of a shed's tin roof was removed, and multiple trees were snapped.						

=== June 6 event ===
List of confirmed tornadoes – Thursday, June 6, 2019
EF#	Location	County / Parish	State	Start Coord.	Time (UTC)	Path length	Max width
EF1	SW of Roanoke	Jefferson Davis	LA	30.2018°N 92.7579°W	05:34–05:39	1.57 mi (2.53 km)	100 yd (91 m)
EF1	A shed was damaged, a residence had some shingles removed, and several trees were snapped.						
EF1	N of Jennings	Jefferson Davis	LA	30.2884°N 92.66°W	06:06–06:09	0.45 mi (0.72 km)	311 yd (284 m)
EF1	The roof of a small mobile home was ripped off, a couple of sheds were destroyed, and two houses suffered minor roof damage.						
EF0	N of Redich	Acadia	LA	30.4238°N 92.5668°W	06:54–06:55	0.37 mi (0.60 km)	115 yd (105 m)
EF0	A weak tornado broke a few tree limbs and removed shingles from a portion of a home.						
EF1	NW of Lake Arthur	Jefferson Davis	LA	30.0856°N 92.6946°W	07:22–07:29	0.75 mi (1.21 km)	100 yd (91 m)
EF1	A couple of awnings were removed from homes, including one that was tossed across a highway. A portion of skirting was ripped from a mobile home. A vehicle was damaged by debris, and trees were snapped.						
EF1	SE of Basile	Evangeline, Acadia	LA	30.4808°N 92.5688°W	07:30–07:34	0.32 mi (0.51 km)	202 yd (185 m)
EF1	Multiple trees were snapped. One home sustained minor roof damage.						
EF1	W of Sunset	St. Landry	LA	30.4053°N 92.1262°W	08:43–08:48	1.26 mi (2.03 km)	186 yd (170 m)
EF1	One home saw its roof ripped off. A mobile home, a shed, vehicles, power lines, and trees were damaged as well.						
EF0	SW of Kaplan	Vermillion	LA	29.9626°N 92.3603°W	09:24–09:30	2.6 mi (4.2 km)	51 yd (47 m)
EF0	A mobile home's roof and nearby trees were damaged.						
EF1	SSW of Beggs	St. Landry	LA	30.6715°N 92.0541°W	09:49–09:53	0.97 mi (1.56 km)	93 yd (85 m)
EF1	The roof of a church was damaged and nearby power lines were downed.						
EF1	W of Krotz Springs	St. Landry	LA	30.5332°N 91.7699°W	10:31–10:35	1 mi (1.6 km)	419 yd (383 m)
EF1	Trees and power lines were downed; one tree struck a car.						
EF1	Baton Rouge	East Baton Rouge	LA	30.385°N 91.099°W	12:55–13:00	0.82 mi (1.32 km)	20 yd (18 m)
EF1	A narrow tornado first impacted a warehouse, breaking a few windows, damaging overhang awnings, inflicting minor roof damage, and rolling an empty semi-trailer. It continued into the grounds of a hospital, flipping a car and moving several others. One hospital building had a large set of windows on its backside broken, and the hospital itself had its exterior damaged, particularly upper-story windows. A metal pole was bent, and several trees were snapped or uprooted.						
EF1	Prairieville to Hobart	Ascension	LA	30.296°N 90.925°W	14:09–14:12	1.73 mi (2.78 km)	50 yd (46 m)
EF1	Numerous trees were snapped or uprooted, several of which fell and inflicted severe damage to homes. A barn's roof was partially removed.						
EF0	NW of Paincourtville	Assumption	LA	30.0017°N 91.0841°W	14:26–14:28	1.72 mi (2.77 km)	50 yd (46 m)
EF0	A power pole was tilted, a corner piece of metal was ripped from an old mobile home, and some large tree branches were damaged.						
EF1	Colyell	Livingston	LA	30.391°N 90.776°W	14:33–14:36	1.61 mi (2.59 km)	75 yd (69 m)
EF1	Trees were snapped and uprooted, and power lines were downed.						
EF1	N of Convent	St. James	LA	30.0753°N 90.8993°W	14:42–14:47	0.52 mi (0.84 km)	75 yd (69 m)
EF1	The roof and a few walls of a shed were ripped off. Trees were snapped.						
EF2	ESE of Sorrento	Ascension	LA	30.1733°N 90.7887°W	15:01–15:04	1.6 mi (2.6 km)	50 yd (46 m)
EF2	A strong tornado began at a chemical plant, lifting an office trailer, snapping the metal tie downs, and moving the structure 50 ft (15 m). The roof and walls of the trailer were removed. Five people were injured.						
EF1	SW of Thibodaux	Lafourche	LA	29.752°N 90.726°W	15:33–15:35	0.27 mi (0.43 km)	100 yd (91 m)
EF1	Two well-constructed storage buildings suffered major roof damage, and a third suffered extensive damage to its walls and roof when the carport above it was lifted and destroyed. A multi-ton storage container was pushed several inches from its original location, and a nearby poorly constructed buildings sustained wall panel and roof damage. Several large trees were snapped.						
EF1	S of Killian	Livingston	LA	30.3421°N 90.591°W	15:35–15:37	0.62 mi (1.00 km)	50 yd (46 m)
EF1	Several trees were snapped and uprooted.						
EF0	NW of Selma	Dallas	AL	32.4506°N 87.1436°W	21:07–21:09	0.75 mi (1.21 km)	60 yd (55 m)
EF0	A home's carport was lifted off its supports, damaging the roof of the structure, causing minor damage to the brick facade, and damaging one car. A large outbuilding was damaged, and a few trees were snapped.						

=== June 7 event ===
List of confirmed tornadoes – Friday, June 7, 2019
EF#	Location	County / Parish	State	Start Coord.	Time (UTC)	Path length	Max width
EF0	Chickasaw	Mobile	AL	30.7577°N 88.0809°W	17:57–17:58	0.52 mi (0.84 km)	25 yd (23 m)
EF0	The roofs of a couple of businesses were damaged. Some minor tree damage occurred.						
EF0	NW of Maryville	Blount	TN	35.81°N 84.07°W	19:42–19:43	0.05 mi (0.080 km)	15 yd (14 m)
EF0	A brief landspout tornado damaged several small trees.						
EF0	SE of Maryville	Blount	TN	35.73°N 83.93°W	19:46–19:49	0.12 mi (0.19 km)	30 yd (27 m)
EF0	Several large trees were damaged, a trampoline was blown several yards, and a few shingles were ripped off a house.						

=== June 8 event ===
List of confirmed tornadoes – Saturday, June 8, 2019
EF#	Location	County / Parish	State	Start Coord.	Time (UTC)	Path length	Max width
EFU	W of Burlington	Kit Carson	CO	39.2977°N 102.3226°W	19:58–20:01	0.66 mi (1.06 km)	100 yd (91 m)
EFU	An NWS employee reported a brief landspout tornado.						
EF0	SSE of Ellenboro	Rutherford	NC	35.304°N 81.744°W	21:08–21:09	0.15 mi (0.24 km)	30 yd (27 m)
EF0	A brief tornado uprooted trees around a home and downed a power line.						
EFU	E of Kirk	Kit Carson	CO	39.5599°N 102.3249°W	21:12–21:18	0.53 mi (0.85 km)	100 yd (91 m)
EFU	The public sighted a brief landspout tornado.						
EFU	WSW of St. Francis	Cheyenne	KS	39.73°N 102.01°W	21:35	0.01 mi (0.016 km)	100 yd (91 m)
EFU	Two landspout tornadoes were observed very near one another.						
EFU	NW of St. Francis	Cheyenne	KS	39.86°N 101.97°W	21:48	0.01 mi (0.016 km)	100 yd (91 m)
EFU	Two landspout tornadoes were observed very near one another.						
EF0	SSW of Fondis	Elbert	CO	39.2°N 104.46°W	00:19–00:20	0.01 mi (0.016 km)	25 yd (23 m)
EF0	A trained storm spotter reported a tornado over open country. No damage was observed.						
EF2	SE of Fertile	Polk	MN	47.5°N 96.21°W	00:34–00:45	3.6 mi (5.8 km)	400 yd (370 m)
EF2	Multiple barns and outbuildings were damaged or destroyed, grain bins were thrown and crumpled, and many large trees were snapped or uprooted. Pieces of farm machinery were thrown as well.						
EFU	NW of Winona	Logan	KS	39.1402°N 101.3596°W	01:57–02:01	0.77 mi (1.24 km)	50 yd (46 m)
EFU	Several storm chasers and the TORUS project reported an anticyclonic landspout tornado.						
EFU	W of Winona	Logan	KS	39.0847°N 101.2766°W	02:10–02:26	2.89 mi (4.65 km)	100 yd (91 m)
EFU	Several storm chasers and the TORUS project reported a tornado.						
EFU	W of Winona	Logan	KS	38.9713°N 101.1154°W	03:05–03:07	0.57 mi (0.92 km)	100 yd (91 m)
EFU	A storm chaser reported a tornado in an open field.						

=== June 9 event ===
List of confirmed tornadoes – Sunday, June 9, 2019
EF#	Location	County / Parish	State	Start Coord.	Time (UTC)	Path length	Max width
EFU	NE of Winthrop	Buchanan, Delaware	IA	42.4942°N 91.658°W	20:53–21:16	7.26 mi (11.68 km)	10 yd (9.1 m)
EFU	A weak landspout tornado caused no discernible damage.						
EFU	NE of Central City	Linn	IA	42.2347°N 91.5004°W	21:24–21:37	6.43 mi (10.35 km)	10 yd (9.1 m)
EFU	A weak landspout tornado caused no discernible damage.						
EFU	S of Anamosa	Jones	IA	42.0691°N 91.2907°W	22:14–22:17	1.05 mi (1.69 km)	10 yd (9.1 m)
EFU	A weak landspout tornado caused no discernible damage.						
EF2	Western Copperas Cove	Coryell	TX	31.1376°N 97.9439°W	22:24–22:28	1.57 mi (2.53 km)	500 yd (460 m)
EF2	A tornado impacted 196 homes in the western part of Copperas Cove. Two of these homes sustained major damage, sustaining loss of roof decking, along with considerable damage to exterior walls. Many other homes sustained minor to moderate tree damage, and large trees were downed as well.						
EF0	WSW of Liberty Hill	Williamson	TX	30.6289°N 98.0326°W	23:34–23:35	0.74 mi (1.19 km)	50 yd (46 m)
EF0	Numerous trees were damaged.						

=== June 11 event ===
List of confirmed tornadoes – Tuesday, June 11, 2019
EF#	Location	County / Parish	State	Start Coord.	Time (UTC)	Path length	Max width
EF0	Pipestone	Pipestone	MN	44.0028°N 96.3268°W	21:19–21:20	0.08 mi (0.13 km)	10 yd (9.1 m)
EF0	Two metal sheds suffered damage to small sections of their roofs and door panels. A section of the south-facing roof to an apartment building in town was removed as well.						

=== June 12 event ===
List of confirmed tornadoes – Wednesday, June 12, 2019
EF#	Location	County / Parish	State	Start Coord.	Time (UTC)	Path length	Max width
EF0	WNW of Millstadt	St. Clair	IL	38.4765°N 90.1512°W	23:14–23:17	0.53 mi (0.85 km)	10 yd (9.1 m)
EF0	A brief tornado blew the garage door of a home in and caused minor siding damage.						

=== June 13 event ===
List of confirmed tornadoes – Thursday, June 13, 2019
EF#	Location	County / Parish	State	Start Coord.	Time (UTC)	Path length	Max width
EF0	ENE of Aquilla	Geauga	OH	41.5638°N 81.09°W	20:06–20:10	0.41 mi (0.66 km)	75 yd (69 m)
EF0	Tree limbs were snapped and a home and outbuilding were damaged.						
EF1	Elk Neck State Park	Cecil	MD	39.4800°N 75.9942°W	23:02–23:10	4.56 mi (7.34 km)	580 yd (530 m)
EF1	At Elk Neck State Park hundreds of trees were either snapped or uprooted by a tornado, with the possibility that the twister initially formed over water. Some outbuildings suffered minor damage.						
EF0	Mullica Hill	Gloucester	NJ	39.7469°N 75.2447°W	00:15–00:16	0.32 mi (0.51 km)	50 yd (46 m)
EF0	Ancillary structures at two homes were damaged.						
EF1	Deptford Twp	Gloucester	NJ	39.8011°N 75.0983°W	00:30–00:35	2.07 mi (3.33 km)	200 yd (180 m)
EF1	Trees were snapped and uprooted at several locations along a tornado's discontinuous path. Three homes and an apartment building were damaged by fallen trees.						

=== June 14 event ===
List of confirmed tornadoes – Friday, June 14, 2019
EF#	Location	County / Parish	State	Start Coord.	Time (UTC)	Path length	Max width
EF0	WNW of Kennan to WNW of Ogema	Price	WI	45.55°N 90.67°W	23:54–00:36	17.4 mi (28.0 km)	50 yd (46 m)
EF0	Numerous trees were damaged, suffering broken branches. Several structures sustained minor damage including lost shingles and peeled roofing.						

=== June 15 event ===
List of confirmed tornadoes – Saturday, June 15, 2019
EF#	Location	County / Parish	State	Start Coord.	Time (UTC)	Path length	Max width
EF0	N of Whitten	Hardin	IA	42.3123°N 93.0061°W	19:21–19:23	0.21 mi (0.34 km)	20 yd (18 m)
EF0	A very old barn was destroyed.						
EF0	W of Benld	Macoupin	IL	39.0977°N 89.8282°W	19:43–19:47	1.82 mi (2.93 km)	30 yd (27 m)
EF0	Several homes sustained minor damage. Trees and power lines were also damaged.						
EF0	WSW of Edmunds	Stutsman	ND	47.1952°N 99.0919°W	19:53–19:55	0.37 mi (0.60 km)	30 yd (27 m)
EF0	The public reported a tornado in an open field.						
EF0	Mound City	Holt	MO	40.1415°N 95.2396°W	21:22–21:23	0.71 mi (1.14 km)	15 yd (14 m)
EF0	Several tree limbs and other light objects were damaged in Mound City.						
EF0	W of Cathay	Wells	ND	47.5436°N 99.4782°W	21:29–21:31	0.46 mi (0.74 km)	30 yd (27 m)
EF0	Law enforcement reported a tornado in an open field.						
EFU	S of Summerfield	Castro	TX	34.6866°N 102.5°W	22:20	0.01 mi (0.016 km)	10 yd (9.1 m)
EFU	Trained storm spotters with the NSSL-TORUS experiment reported a brief tornado.						
EF1	Freedom to S of Spencer	Owen	IN	39.2038°N 86.8726°W	22:29–22:45	8.11 mi (13.05 km)	200 yd (180 m)
EF1	A tornado struck downtown Freedom, snapping or uprooting numerous trees. The tornado primarily tracked along the White River, resulting in limited damage. Near Spencer a large building had its roof uplifted, resulting in the collapse of its exterior walls.						
EF2	W of Ellettsville	Monroe	IN	39.2473°N 86.6671°W	22:48–22:58	3.68 mi (5.92 km)	400 yd (370 m)
EF2	A tornado shredded a 400 yd (370 m) wide swath of trees near Ellettsville. Several barns and outbuildings were destroyed north of the town, and an unanchored garage was swept off its foundation.						
EF2	NE of Koleen	Greene	IN	39.0456°N 86.7965°W	22:56–23:00	3.52 mi (5.66 km)	400 yd (370 m)
EF2	A tornado snapped trees across 100 acres (40 hectares) and caused significant damage to a well-built structure. A mobile home and some outbuildings were destroyed as well.						
EF0	NNW of Johnsonville	Deuel	SD	44.6°N 96.8°W	23:05–23:06	0.12 mi (0.19 km)	10 yd (9.1 m)
EF0	An anticyclonic tornado downed seven trees and tossed tree limbs, one of which bent part of the metal overhang to a shed.						
EF1	Beech Grove	Marion	IN	39.7071°N 86.0971°W	23:26–23:30	1.86 mi (2.99 km)	200 yd (180 m)
EF1	This tornado roof damage to a school, and apartment building, and a steel company in Beech Grove. A scoreboard was damaged at the school as well,						
EF0	E of Beech Grove	Marion	IN	39.7397°N 86.0009°W	23:37–23:38	0.89 mi (1.43 km)	100 yd (91 m)
EF0	A brief tornado caused significant damage to several outbuildings and minor damage to trees.						
EF0	S of Story	Brown	IN	39.0788°N 86.211°W	23:46–23:47	0.64 mi (1.03 km)	50 yd (46 m)
EF0	A tornado was witnessed to the south of Story, causing tree damage.						
EF2	SW of Rushville	Rush	IN	39.5451°N 85.5457°W	00:48–01:08	14.48 mi (23.30 km)	200 yd (180 m)
EF2	A barn and two metal silos were destroyed, while a home sustained significant damage. A detached garage was destroyed, and trees were damaged. Trailers were also damaged at a trucking company.						
EFU	W of Mediapolis	Des Moines	IA	41.009°N 91.2342°W	00:48–01:08	0.83 mi (1.34 km)	40 yd (37 m)
EFU	The public sighted a tornado in an open field. No damage occurred.						
EF0	S of Bentonville	Fayette	IN	39.7376°N 85.2437°W	01:02–01:03	0.1 mi (0.16 km)	20 yd (18 m)
EF0	A brief tornado caused the roof and exterior wall of an old church to collapse. Debris was scattered up to 200 yd (180 m) downstream.						
EF2	SW of Oakville	Des Moines	IA	41.0576°N 91.0716°W	01:20–01:26	1.82 mi (2.93 km)	260 yd (240 m)
EF2	A strong tornado destroyed an outbuilding, threw two pieces of farm equipment 40 yd (37 m), and tossed a pickup truck 20 yd (18 m). A house was shifted off its foundation, with all of its windows blown out and its bolted down garage destroyed and lofted too. Three power poles were snapped, numerous trees were downed, and power lines were leaned over.						
EF2	SSW of Oakville	Des Moines	IA	41.0551°N 91.0520°W	01:24–01:28	1.3 mi (2.1 km)	300 yd (270 m)
EF2	Another strong tornado began just east of the previous one, damaging trees and the roof of a mobile home. A pig farm building was destroyed, and a wooden high power transmission line was toppled. One other house suffered damage.						
EF1	NE of Keithsburg	Mercer	IL	41.1133°N 90.9042°W	01:38–01:39	0.68 mi (1.09 km)	40 yd (37 m)
EF1	A brief tornado snapped trees near a farmstead.						
EF1	S of Putnam	Dewey, Custer	OK	35.833°N 98.932°W	01:40–01:50	3.15 mi (5.07 km)	100 yd (91 m)
EF1	A few tree limbs and a wooden cross member on a power pole were broken.						
EF1	ENE of Yankee Town	Union	IN	39.6998°N 84.9239°W	01:42–01:44	2.11 mi (3.40 km)	35 yd (32 m)
EF1	A well-constructed metal farm building was largely destroyed, with debris scattered up to 0.5 mi (0.80 km) downstream.						
EF0	Richmond	Wayne	IN	39.8214°N 84.8505°W	01:51–01:54	1.6 mi (2.6 km)	100 yd (91 m)
EF0	A tornado damaged numerous homes and businesses, with the most significant damage occurring at and around the Richmond Mall. At the mall, multiple air handlers were torn off the roof, and windows were blown out. The structure's roof sustained minor damage, with less than five percent being removed. A brick wall along the mall's parking lot was destroyed. Two people were injured along U.S. Route 40 when their car windows were blown in. Numerous trees were snapped on the tornado's path.						
EF0	WNW of West Florence	Preble	OH	39.7585°N 84.8057°W	01:56–01:59	1.7 mi (2.7 km)	35 yd (32 m)
EF0	A weak tornado traversed predominantly rural areas of western Preble County. Numerous trees were blown down, a barn had its doors blown out, and two homes sustained damage from fallen tree limbs.						
EF2	NW of Custer City (1st tornado)	Custer	OK	35.769°N 98.969°W	02:06–02:13	6.25 mi (10.06 km)	500 yd (460 m)
EF2	More than a dozen power poles were downed. The roof of one house was removed, and a nearby boat was tossed.						
EF0	NW of Custer City (2nd tornado)	Custer	OK	35.74°N 98.976°W	02:16–02:18	1.3 mi (2.1 km)	300 yd (270 m)
EF0	Trees were damaged.						
EF1	W of Custer City	Custer	OK	35.686°N 98.964°W	02:42–02:45	1.5 mi (2.4 km)	400 yd (370 m)
EF1	An outbuilding was destroyed and pieces of tin were blown for several hundred yards. A house suffered roof damage and a number of trees were damaged.						
EF1	SW of South Pekin	Tazewell	IL	40.4648°N 89.6351°W	03:19–03:22	2.43 mi (3.91 km)	200 yd (180 m)
EF1	Numerous trees were snapped, an outbuilding was destroyed, and one home sustained damage.						
EF1	S of Bellflower	McLean	IL	40.3591°N 88.5289°W	04:36–04:39	1.94 mi (3.12 km)	50 yd (46 m)
EF1	A tornado caused significant tree damage and destroyed a large machine shed. Debris was lofted up to 1 mi (1.6 km) away.						
EF1	NW of Jacktown	Lincoln	OK	35.579°N 97.115°W	04:51–04:57	5.2 mi (8.4 km)	50 yd (46 m)
EF1	A few homes suffered roof and/or siding damage. Barns and outbuildings were damaged or destroyed. Power poles were damaged.						

=== June 16 event ===
List of confirmed tornadoes – Sunday, June 16, 2019
EF#	Location	County / Parish	State	Start Coord.	Time (UTC)	Path length	Max width
EF1	N of Windham to WSW of Howland Center	Portage, Trumbull	OH	41.2807°N 81.024°W	19:11–19:25	13.47 mi (21.68 km)	250 yd (230 m)
EF1	An intermittent tornado destroyed several outbuildings and caused extensive tree damage.						
EF0	ESE of Omega	Kingfisher	OK	35.8312°N 98.0845°W	19:18–19:19	0.2 mi (0.32 km)	20 yd (18 m)
EF0	A storm chaser observed a landspout tornado. No damage was reported.						
EF0	ESE of Omega	Kingfisher	OK	35.8312°N 98.0845°W	19:19–19:20	0.2 mi (0.32 km)	20 yd (18 m)
EF0	A storm chaser reported a second landspout tornado ongoing simultaneously. No damage occurred.						
EF1	WSW of Glenwillow	Cuyahoga	OH	41.3591°N 81.4981°W	19:23–19:28	2.2 mi (3.5 km)	150 yd (140 m)
EF1	A short-lived tornado snapped or uprooted several trees.						
EFU	ESE of Azle	Tarrant	TX	32.8842°N 97.4973°W	19:58–19:59	0.01 mi (0.016 km)	10 yd (9.1 m)
EFU	A brief tornado occurred over Eagle Mountain Lake.						
EF0	SE of Haslet	Tarrant	TX	32.9223°N 97.3041°W	20:07–20:09	1.28 mi (2.06 km)	132 yd (121 m)
EF0	Numerous homes sustained mostly minor damage, though one had approximately 20 percent of its roof decking removed and windows blown in.						
EF1	Arlington	Tarrant	TX	32.7552°N 97.094°W	20:25–20:26	0.21 mi (0.34 km)	100 yd (91 m)
EF1	A brief tornado occurred in Arlington, downing trees and causing significant roof damage to a few homes. The tornado dissipated just before reaching the AT&T Stadium.						
EF1	ESE of Vienna	Trumbull	OH	41.2386°N 80.6379°W	20:44–21:02	6 mi (9.7 km)	250 yd (230 m)
EF1	A tornado caused extensive tree damage.						
EF0	ESE of Farmers Branch	Dallas	TX	32.9246°N 96.8659°W	20:45–20:46	0.12 mi (0.19 km)	50 yd (46 m)
EF0	A brief tornado tore the roof off of a YMCA and caused nearby tree damage.						
EF1	WSW of Sharon	Mercer	PA	41.227°N 80.519°W	21:03–21:05	1.14 mi (1.83 km)	150 yd (140 m)
EF1	A trailer was blown over by the tornado. Several trees were downed, with one damaging the roof and chimney of a house.						
EF1	Parker	Butler, Armstrong	PA	41.1°N 79.707°W	22:18–22:23	1.54 mi (2.48 km)	400 yd (370 m)
EF1	This tornado moved directly through Parker, where a detached garage had most of its roof torn off, a storage trailer was flipped, and a truck wash had an exterior wall blown out. Numerous trees were snapped or uprooted, some of which landed on homes.						
EF0	SSE of Wayne	McClain	OK	34.9066°N 97.3133°W	22:50	0.2 mi (0.32 km)	20 yd (18 m)
EF0	A storm chaser observed a brief landspout tornado. No damage was reported.						
EF1	ENE of Commodore	Indiana	PA	40.714°N 78.924°W	23:55–22:57	0.27 mi (0.43 km)	50 yd (46 m)
EF1	A tornado uprooted and snapped several trees. A barn sustained minor shingle and roof damage as well.						

=== June 17 event ===
List of confirmed tornadoes – Monday, June 17, 2019
EF#	Location	County / Parish	State	Start Coord.	Time (UTC)	Path length	Max width
EFU	NW of Terril	Dickinson	IA	43.3249°N 95.0294°W	15:59–16:03	0.75 mi (1.21 km)	10 yd (9.1 m)
EFU	An emergency manager reported a landspout tornado over cropland. No damage occurred.						
EF1	WNW of Raymond	Hinds	MS	32.2739°N 90.4462°W	18:53–18:56	2.48 mi (3.99 km)	150 yd (140 m)
EF1	Multiple trees were snapped or uprooted. Two utility poles broke and a home sustained minor roof damage.						
EFU	SW of Chivington	Kiowa	CO	38.4°N 102.58°W	20:50–20:53	0.1 mi (0.16 km)	10 yd (9.1 m)
EFU	A storm chaser observed a tornado. No damage was reported.						
EF0	S of Owatonna	Steele	MN	44.046°N 93.2279°W	20:52–20:53	0.02 mi (0.032 km)	30 yd (27 m)
EF0	Law enforcement reported a landspout tornado over an open field.						
EF0	E of Encino	Torrance	NM	34.6493°N 105.4403°W	21:02–21:08	1.33 mi (2.14 km)	30 yd (27 m)
EF0	A traveler videoed a tornado. No damage occurred.						
EF0	WSW of Buckingham	Weld	CO	40.61°N 104.02°W	23:03–23:04	0.01 mi (0.016 km)	25 yd (23 m)
EF0	A storm chaser reported a tornado in a field. No damage occurred.						
EFU	SW of Haswell	Kiowa	CO	38.4°N 103.24°W	23:55–23:57	0.1 mi (0.16 km)	10 yd (9.1 m)
EFU	The public reported a brief tornado. No damage was observed.						

=== June 18 event ===
List of confirmed tornadoes – Tuesday, June 18, 2019
EF#	Location	County / Parish	State	Start Coord.	Time (UTC)	Path length	Max width
EF0	NW of Kinsley	Edwards	KS	38.0223°N 99.49°W	19:37–19:42	1.42 mi (2.29 km)	75 yd (69 m)
EF0	A storm chaser witnessed a tornado.						
EFU	N of Grand Marais	Cook	MN	47.89°N 90.3°W	19:45–19:46	0.1 mi (0.16 km)	5 yd (4.6 m)
EFU	Trees were damaged.						
EF0	NNE of Kingsmill	Gray	TX	35.5174°N 101.0515°W	01:10–01:12	0.96 mi (1.54 km)	20 yd (18 m)
EF0	A landspout tornado caused minimal damage.						

=== June 19 event ===
List of confirmed tornadoes – Wednesday, June 19, 2019
EF#	Location	County / Parish	State	Start Coord.	Time (UTC)	Path length	Max width
EF0	S of Harleton	Harrison	TX	32.6266°N 94.5798°W	11:03–11:04	0.18 mi (0.29 km)	70 yd (64 m)
EF0	Trees were uprooted.						
EF1	Northern Konawa	Seminole	OK	34.963°N 96.748°W	13:21–13:22	1 mi (1.6 km)	50 yd (46 m)
EF1	Numerous trees were downed and fell on homes in the northern part of Konawa, causing significant roof and siding damage.						
EF0	S of Hathaway	Jefferson Davis	LA	30.31°N 92.67°W	16:45	0.01 mi (0.016 km)	10 yd (9.1 m)
EF0	A brief landspout tornado was widely photographed. No damage occurred.						
EF0	W of Mission	Todd	SD	43.3011°N 100.7002°W	18:05	0.1 mi (0.16 km)	20 yd (18 m)
EF0	A landspout tornado caused minor damage to a residence and nearby trees.						
EF0	SSW of Southside	Montgomery	TN	36.3283°N 87.3259°W	23:10–23:12	1.25 mi (2.01 km)	100 yd (91 m)
EF0	Some homes sustained roof damage. A few trees and a carport were downed.						
EF1	Haworth	McCurtain	OK	33.8458°N 94.6576°W	23:24–23:26	0.38 mi (0.61 km)	75 yd (69 m)
EF1	Trees were damaged in town, one of which fell on a home and caused significant roof damage.						
EF0	W of Moweaqua	Christian	IL	39.6214°N 89.0559°W	23:40–23:41	0.1 mi (0.16 km)	10 yd (9.1 m)
EF0	Crops were damaged.						
EF1	SW of Buffalo	Johnson	WY	44.1539°N 107.0959°W	00:56–01:02	4.09 mi (6.58 km)	250 yd (230 m)
EF1	Numerous trees were snapped and uprooted. Several snow fences were torn apart and tossed in all directions.						
EF0	NW of Cartter	Marion	IL	38.574°N 88.938°W	00:22–00:23	0.08 mi (0.13 km)	25 yd (23 m)
EF0	A brief tornado remained over open field, causing no damage.						
EF0	N of Dunn	Moultrie	IL	39.6451°N 88.6948°W	00:22–00:23	0.11 mi (0.18 km)	10 yd (9.1 m)
EF0	Crops suffered minor damage.						
EF0	NE of Bill	Converse	WY	43.23°N 105.24°W	01:50–02:06	12.62 mi (20.31 km)	50 yd (46 m)
EF0	A manufactured home had its roof partially removed.						
EF2	NE of Benton	Bossier	LA	32.7561°N 93.6880°W	03:47–03:49	1.44 mi (2.32 km)	175 yd (160 m)
EF2	Most of the roof of a two-story home was torn off. Hundreds of trees were also downed, damaging additional homes.						

=== June 20 event ===
List of confirmed tornadoes – Thursday, June 20, 2019
EF#	Location	County / Parish	State	Start Coord.	Time (UTC)	Path length	Max width
EF1	SW of Ball	Rapides	LA	31.4115°N 92.404°W	08:14–08:16	0.94 mi (1.51 km)	100 yd (91 m)
EF1	Uprooted trees damaged several homes.						
EF1	NNW of Deville	Rapides	LA	31.3933°N 92.1697°W	08:30–08:33	1.76 mi (2.83 km)	250 yd (230 m)
EF1	Numerous trees were snapped or uprooted.						
EF1	NNW of Clements	Redwood	MN	44.4525°N 95.2105°W	22:18–22:37	5.39 mi (8.67 km)	550 yd (500 m)
EF1	Several farmsteads were impacted. Dozens of trees were snapped or uprooted. An open air building on a feedlot was destroyed, several machine sheds had their doors blown out, and tin was peeled off the portion of several roofs.						
EF0	S of Leavenworth	Brown	MN	44.2028°N 94.8309°W	23:27–23:31	2.03 mi (3.27 km)	50 yd (46 m)
EF0	Around one dozen trees were broken and several outbuildings suffered minor damage.						
EF0	SE of Godahl	Watonwan	MN	44.1049°N 94.6351°W	23:42–23:44	0.52 mi (0.84 km)	30 yd (27 m)
EF0	A tornado occurred in an open field.						

=== June 21 event ===
List of confirmed tornadoes – Friday, June 21, 2019
EF#	Location	County / Parish	State	Start Coord.	Time (UTC)	Path length	Max width
EF1	S of Gilbertsville	Marshall	KY	36.9905°N 88.297°W	22:42–22:43	0.76 mi (1.22 km)	50 yd (46 m)
EF1	Two piers at a marina near Kentucky Dam broke loose. Roofs and pier connections at the marina were also damaged.						
EF1	N of Golden Pond	Lyon, Trigg	KY	36.904°N 88.074°W	23:00–23:03	2.08 mi (3.35 km)	150 yd (140 m)
EF1	Hundreds of trees were either snapped or uprooted.						
EF0	SE of Fort Stockton	Pecos	TX	30.7163°N 102.6794°W	23:10–23:14	0.31 mi (0.50 km)	30 yd (27 m)
EF0	A brief tornado remained over rural areas without causing damage.						
EF1	E of Cadiz	Trigg	KY	36.8684°N 87.7779°W	23:22–23:27	4.35 mi (7.00 km)	200 yd (180 m)
EF1	Eight homes sustained minor roof damage. A barn was destroyed. Two hundred trees and several power lines were downed.						
EF1	SE of Gracey	Christian	KY	36.8023°N 87.6097°W	23:31–23:33	0.96 mi (1.54 km)	75 yd (69 m)
EF1	Three empty grain silos were destroyed. Many trees were snapped or uprooted. One home lost half of its roof.						
EF1	NE of Herndon	Christian	KY	36.7706°N 87.6551°W	23:31–23:41	7.59 mi (12.21 km)	175 yd (160 m)
EF1	Several homes sustained soffit and roofing damage. A guest house collapsed.						
EF0	S of Trenton	Todd	KY	36.6977°N 87.2622°W	23:57–00:01	2.81 mi (4.52 km)	60 yd (55 m)
EF0	Cornfields and trees were damaged by the tornado.						
EF1	Hillsdale	Simpson	KY	36.7953°N 86.4819°W	00:35–00:46	0.6 mi (0.97 km)	75 yd (69 m)
EF1	Hardwood trees were snapped and uprooted.						
EF1	N of Mount Aerial	Allen	KY	36.7726°N 86.3893°W	00:39–00:43	4.6 mi (7.4 km)	125 yd (114 m)
EF1	Numerous trees were snapped or uprooted. A well-built barn was uplifted and removed from its foundation. Corn was flattened and twisted. Large, heavy fuel tanks were rolled in two different directions. Several barns and outbuildings suffered roof damage.						
EF0	SW of Green Hill	Davidson	TN	36.1824°N 86.6572°W	01:00–01:02	2 mi (3.2 km)	200 yd (180 m)
EF0	Downed trees damaged homes.						
EF0	NNW of La Vergne	Davidson	TN	36.0783°N 86.6076°W	01:04–01:06	1.25 mi (2.01 km)	50 yd (46 m)
EF0	Significant roof and siding damage was inflicted in several homes. Uprooted trees also fell onto homes, causing additional minor damage.						
EF1	SE of Amos	Allen	KY	36.6484°N 86.0819°W	01:04–01:05	1.44 mi (2.32 km)	125 yd (114 m)
EF1	A tornado snapped or uprooted numerous trees, inflicted severe roof damage to several barns, and impaled about a dozen 2x4s into the ground. Some homes were damaged by fallen trees. The tornado was embedded within a very large downburst which caused severe straight-line wind damage to surrounding areas.						
EF1	NNE of Lafayette	Macon	TN	36.617°N 86.0216°W	01:07–01:09	2.92 mi (4.70 km)	300 yd (270 m)
EF1	Hundreds of trees were snapped and uprooted along the path, a few homes were damaged by falling trees, and several barns and outbuildings were damaged. The path of this tornado was adjusted, widened and extended in June 2021 based on newly available high-resolution satellite imagery.						
EF1	E of Allardt	Fentress	TN	36.3802°N 84.7994°W	02:24–02:27	3 mi (4.8 km)	150 yd (140 m)
EF1	A number of barns and outbuildings were damaged along with hundreds of trees.						

=== June 22 event ===
List of confirmed tornadoes – Saturday, June 22, 2019
EF#	Location	County / Parish	State	Start Coord.	Time (UTC)	Path length	Max width
EFU	N of Kimball	Kimball	NE	41.38°N 103.66°W	01:10–01:12	0.29 mi (0.47 km)	30 yd (27 m)
EFU	A storm chaser sighted a landspout tornado over open fields. No damage occurred.						
EFU	N of Pritchett	Baca	CO	37.63°N 102.88°W	02:30–02:32	0.1 mi (0.16 km)	10 yd (9.1 m)
EFU	A storm chaser reported a tornado. No damage was seen.						
EF0	SE of Goodnight	Armstrong	TX	34.9992°N 101.1359°W	03:43–03:49	2.45 mi (3.94 km)	50 yd (46 m)
EF0	A center pivot irrigation system and a home's roof were damaged.						
EF0	E of Goodnight	Armstrong	TX	35.0339°N 101.0967°W	03:55–04:04	2.08 mi (3.35 km)	200 yd (180 m)
EF0	The roofing deck of a cabin was damaged. Several vacant truck containers were thrown by the tornado, damaging a power pole.						

=== June 23 event ===
List of confirmed tornadoes – Sunday, June 23, 2019
EF#	Location	County / Parish	State	Start Coord.	Time (UTC)	Path length	Max width
EF0	SE of Paris	Logan	AR	35.2624°N 93.6835°W	07:36–07:37	0.06 mi (0.097 km)	25 yd (23 m)
EF0	A mobile home was damaged.						
EFU	SE of Attica	Harper	KS	37.2°N 98.21°W	08:20–08:22	0.81 mi (1.30 km)	50 yd (46 m)
EFU	Local law enforcement reported a tornado. No damage occurred.						
EFU	SSW of Harper	Harper	KS	37.27°N 98.03°W	08:37–08:38	0.56 mi (0.90 km)	50 yd (46 m)
EFU	Local law enforcement reported a tornado. No damage occurred.						
EF0	SE of Paris	Logan	AR	35.2559°N 93.6632°W	10:49–10:50	0.07 mi (0.11 km)	25 yd (23 m)
EF0	Trees were uprooted.						
EF1	NW of Bardwell	Carlisle	KY	36.8967°N 89.0372°W	21:20–21:21	0.93 mi (1.50 km)	100 yd (91 m)
EF1	The tornado snapped and uprooted trees.						
EF1	SE of Blandville	Carlisle	KY	36.9294°N 88.944°W	21:27–21:28	0.15 mi (0.24 km)	150 yd (140 m)
EF1	The tornado snapped and uprooted trees.						
EF1	SW of Lovelaceville	McCracken	KY	36.9611°N 88.8435°W	21:33–21:53	17.28 mi (27.81 km)	150 yd (140 m)
EF1	A strip mall in Paducah had its windows blown out, with extensive damage nearby. Large and mature trees were downed.						
EF1	Smithland	Livingston	KY	37.1348°N 88.4056°W	22:02–22:03	0.5 mi (0.80 km)	140 yd (130 m)
EF1	The roofs of homes and a gas station canopy in Smithland sustained minor damage. A church had its roof peeled back, and a mobile home was destroyed by this high-end EF1 tornado.						
EF1	NE of Smithland	Livingston	KY	37.1798°N 88.3594°W	22:07–22:08	0.79 mi (1.27 km)	125 yd (114 m)
EF1	Several trees were uprooted or snapped.						
EF1	NW of Golconda	Pope	IL	37.402°N 88.523°W	22:10–22:15	2.8 mi (4.5 km)	120 yd (110 m)
EF1	One home sustained shingle damage.						
EF1	ESE of Birmingham	Marhsall	KY	36.9166°N 88.2194°W	22:13–22:14	0.23 mi (0.37 km)	50 yd (46 m)
EF1	A section of marina at a resort along Kentucky Lake was twisted. The entirety of the marina was dislodged from the shore.						
EF0	ESE of Gulivoire Park	St. Joseph	IN	41.5929°N 86.2050°W	00:32–00:36	0.48 mi (0.77 km)	10 yd (9.1 m)
EF0	A brief and narrow tornado caused minor tree damage and tore siding and shingles from a detached garage.						
EF0	ENE of Gulivoire Park	St. Joseph	IN	41.6211°N 86.2140°W	00:38–00:48	2.01 mi (3.23 km)	250 yd (230 m)
EF0	A daycare center was severely damaged, sustaining major roof damage and some loss of exterior walls.						

=== June 24 event ===
List of confirmed tornadoes – Monday, June 24, 2019
EF#	Location	County / Parish	State	Start Coord.	Time (UTC)	Path length	Max width
EF0	WSW of Brodenax	Morehouse	LA	32.5525°N 91.8706°W	06:45–06:48	1.24 mi (2.00 km)	75 yd (69 m)
EF0	Trees were snapped.						
EF1	N of Edwards	Warren, Yazoo	MS	32.4969°N 90.5844°W	08:45–08:50	3.28 mi (5.28 km)	440 yd (400 m)
EF1	Trees throughout Big Black River were heavily damaged.						
EF1	W of Raymond	Hinds	MS	32.2773°N 90.5044°W	08:56–09:04	5.33 mi (8.58 km)	250 yd (230 m)
EF1	Multiple trees were snapped and uprooted. Several buildings belonging to a private school had their roofs damaged.						
EF0	SSE of Raleigh, Mississippi	Smith	MS	31.9619°N 89.4895°W	10:57–10:59	0.78 mi (1.26 km)	50 yd (46 m)
EF0	Some trees were snapped or uprooted.						
EF1	Adams Mills	Brown	OH	40.134°N 81.931°W	20:50–20:51	0.14 mi (0.23 km)	50 yd (46 m)
EF1	Several hardwood trees were snapped or uprooted.						
EF0	Minerva, KY to Ripley, OH	Mason (KY), Brown (OH)	KY, OH	38.6774°N 83.9150°W	21:13–21:20	5.8 mi (9.3 km)	75 yd (69 m)
EF0	In Kentucky, trees were downed, roof paneling was stripped from barns and outbuildings. The tornado crossed into Ohio and struck the town of Ripley, where tree and shingle damage occurred.						
EF1	Latham	Adams, Pike	OH	39.0436°N 83.3705°W	21:55–22:08	9.3 mi (15.0 km)	300 yd (270 m)
EF1	Numerous trees were downed, and homes sustained roof and siding damage.						
EF1	E of Latham	Pike	OH	39.0468°N 82.9083°W	22:28–22:35	4.3 mi (6.9 km)	200 yd (180 m)
EF1	Several shingles were torn from the roof of a home and a nearby barn was destroyed. Two other buildings sustained partial damage to roofs.						
EF1	SW of Alum Creek to Charleston	Kanawha	WV	38.2896°N 81.7655°W	22:51–22:59	7.85 mi (12.63 km)	350 yd (320 m)
EF1	Tornado caused minor roof damage and felled trees.						
EF0	E of Charleston	Kanawha	WV	38.3574°N 81.6059°W	23:02–23:04	0.83 mi (1.34 km)	75 yd (69 m)
EF0	Part of the roof was blown off an office building, a steeple was blown off a church, and several trees were toppled.						
EFU	WSW of Eden	Concho	TX	31.1466°N 100.1096°W	23:02–23:04	0.1 mi (0.16 km)	250 yd (230 m)
EFU	A storm chaser videoed a cone tornado over open country.						

=== June 25 event ===
List of confirmed tornadoes – Tuesday, June 25, 2019
EF#	Location	County / Parish	State	Start Coord.	Time (UTC)	Path length	Max width
EF1	ENE of New Haven (1st tornado)	Crook	WY	44.7721°N 104.721°W	01:56–02:05	5.28 mi (8.50 km)	60 yd (55 m)
EF1	Trees were snapped and uprooted.						
EF1	ENE of New Haven (2nd tornado)	Crook	WY	44.7699°N 104.7214°W	02:02–02:15	5.37 mi (8.64 km)	80 yd (73 m)
EF1	Trees were snapped and uprooted. A grain bin was pushed off its foundation.						

=== June 27 event ===
List of confirmed tornadoes – Thursday, June 27, 2019
EF#	Location	County / Parish	State	Start Coord.	Time (UTC)	Path length	Max width
EF0	NE of Benchland	Judith Basin	MT	47.1°N 109.98°W	23:10	0.25 mi (0.40 km)	400 yd (370 m)
EF0	A brief tornado caused damage to a small barn and ancillary structures in a rural area. An outhouse was flipped and roof paneling with removed.						
EF0	W of Judith Gap	Wheatland	MT	46.68°N 110°W	23:38	0.39 mi (0.63 km)	50 yd (46 m)
EF0	A brief tornado occurred in the foothills of the Little Belt Mountains.						
EF0	SE of Zortman	Phillips	MT	47.8593°N 108.4338°W	01:10–01:13	0.11 mi (0.18 km)	20 yd (18 m)
EF0	Tree tops and power poles were snapped.						

=== June 29 event ===
List of confirmed tornadoes – Saturday, June 29, 2019
EF#	Location	County / Parish	State	Start Coord.	Time (UTC)	Path length	Max width
EF1	SW of Allen	Bennett	SD	43.243°N 101.97°W	20:35–21:15	5.82 mi (9.37 km)	720 yd (660 m)
EF1	This long-lived tornado remained nearly stationary throughout its entire existence. A house and a barn were damaged. A couple of grain bins were toppled. Large trees and two power poles were snapped, corn was ripped from fields, several deer were killed, and grain bags were carried. It was an unusual tornado, described as a "hybrid" between a landspout and a typical supercell-spawned tornado.						

=== June 30 event ===
List of confirmed tornadoes – Sunday, June 30, 2019
EF#	Location	County / Parish	State	Start Coord.	Time (UTC)	Path length	Max width
EFU	SE of Gilman	Iroquois	IL	40.7549°N 87.9614°W	19:39–19:41	0.15 mi (0.24 km)	25 yd (23 m)
EFU	A landspout tornado was photographed. No damage occurred.						
EF0	NW of Lucas	Gregory	SD	43.2991°N 99.2389°W	21:23–21:36	0.65 mi (1.05 km)	25 yd (23 m)
EF0	A soybean field and some trees along a shelter belt were damaged.						

== July ==
Confirmed tornadoes by Enhanced Fujita rating
EFU	EF0	EF1	EF2	EF3	EF4	EF5	Total
14	58	27	1	0	0	0	100

=== July 1 event ===
List of confirmed tornadoes – Monday, July 1, 2019
EF#	Location	County / Parish	State	Start Coord.	Time (UTC)	Path length	Max width
EF0	E of Hollandale	Freeborn	MN	43.76°N 93.17°W	22:05–22:06	0.01 mi (0.016 km)	25 yd (23 m)
EF0	A storm chaser witnessed a brief tornado in an open field.						
EF0	NNE of Portland	Multnomah	OR	45.56°N 122.650°W	00:24–00:32	1.6 mi (2.6 km)	40 yd (37 m)
EF0	Shingles were torn off of roofs along four streets. Large branches were also downed by the tornado with shallow-rooted trees uprooted.						

=== July 3 event ===
List of confirmed tornadoes – Wednesday, July 3, 2019
EF#	Location	County / Parish	State	Start Coord.	Time (UTC)	Path length	Max width
EF0	WNW of Swett	Bennett	SD	43.237°N 102.09°W	22:06	0.01 mi (0.016 km)	7 yd (6.4 m)
EF0	An emergency manager reported a tornado over pasture land. No known damage occurred.						
EF0	W of Allen	Bennett	SD	43.27°N 102.11°W	22:19	0.01 mi (0.016 km)	7 yd (6.4 m)
EF0	An emergency manager reported a tornado over pasture land. No known damage occurred.						
EF0	SSE of Newcastle	Weston (WY), Custer (SD)	WY, SD	43.507°N 104.079°W	22:28–22:44	4.67 mi (7.52 km)	50 yd (46 m)
EF0	A storm chaser reported a tornado. No damage occurred.						
EFU	NE of Riverview	Niobrara	WY	43.5°N 104.06°W	22:30–22:31	0.02 mi (0.032 km)	50 yd (46 m)
EFU	A storm chaser reported a tornado. No damage occurred.						
EF0	WSW of Allen	Bennett	SD	43.244°N 102.01°W	22:37	0.01 mi (0.016 km)	7 yd (6.4 m)
EF0	An emergency manager sighted a tornado over pasture land. No damage occurred.						

=== July 4 event ===
List of confirmed tornadoes – Thursday, July 4, 2019
EF#	Location	County / Parish	State	Start Coord.	Time (UTC)	Path length	Max width
EF0	SW of Ladysmith	Rusk	WI	45.3167°N 91.3458°W	22:39–22:53	7.59 mi (12.21 km)	100 yd (91 m)
EF0	Numerous trees were downed or uprooted, and a few landed on lake cabins causing considerable damage.						
EFU	SW of Chugwater	Platte	WY	41.6929°N 105.0926°W	22:46	0.01 mi (0.016 km)	10 yd (9.1 m)
EFU	A brief tornado touchdown was observed by the local fire department.						
EFU	SW of Chugwater	Platte	WY	41.6833°N 104.8932°W	23:16–23:30	2.03 mi (3.27 km)	200 yd (180 m)
EFU	A widely observed cone tornado was observed over open ranch land.						
EF1	SSW of Deerfield	Pennington	SD	43.86°N 103.945°W	02:17–02:20	1.66 mi (2.67 km)	250 yd (230 m)
EF1	Trees, a water tank, and a tent were damaged.						
EF1	W of Rochford	Pennington	SD	44.138°N 103.86°W	02:21–02:22	0.3 mi (0.48 km)	200 yd (180 m)
EF1	Trees were damaged.						
EF1	ENE of Deerfield	Pennington	SD	44.034°N 103.742°W	02:29–02:31	1.22 mi (1.96 km)	200 yd (180 m)
EF1	Trees were damaged.						
EF0	SW of Holyoke	Phillips	CO	40.54°N 102.36°W	04:41–04:51	0.01 mi (0.016 km)	25 yd (23 m)
EF0	Law enforcement reported a tornado in an open field. No damage was observed.						

=== July 5 event ===
List of confirmed tornadoes – Friday, July 5, 2019
EF#	Location	County / Parish	State	Start Coord.	Time (UTC)	Path length	Max width
EF0	ESE of Friend (1st tornado)	Finney	KS	38.2387°N 100.7875°W	21:45–21:51	0.3 mi (0.48 km)	50 yd (46 m)
EF0	Law enforcement reported a landspout tornado.						
EF0	ESE of Friend (2nd tornado)	Finney	KS	38.2202°N 100.8179°W	21:48–21:52	0.34 mi (0.55 km)	50 yd (46 m)
EF0	A storm chaser sighted a landspout tornado.						
EF0	SSW of Amy	Lane	KS	38.3577°N 100.6502°W	22:03–22:06	0.33 mi (0.53 km)	50 yd (46 m)
EF0	An emergency manager reported a landspout tornado.						
EF0	SW of Mount Dora	Union	NM	36.4445°N 103.5881°W	22:05–22:25	2.14 mi (3.44 km)	50 yd (46 m)
EF0	A rancher and storm chasers reported a landspout tornado.						
EF0	NNW of Henderson	Sibley	MN	44.5843°N 93.9426°W	22:45–22:46	0.16 mi (0.26 km)	25 yd (23 m)
EF0	A storm chaser videoed a tornado in an open field.						
EF0	NNE of Alexander	Rush	KS	38.5221°N 99.5149°W	00:24–00:29	0.4 mi (0.64 km)	50 yd (46 m)
EF0	A storm chaser sighted a landspout tornado.						
EF0	WSW of Kilkenny	Le Sueur	MN	44.2999°N 93.6969°W	00:40–00:41	0.1 mi (0.16 km)	25 yd (23 m)
EF0	Multiple storm chasers videoed a tornado in a field.						

=== July 6 event ===
List of confirmed tornadoes – Saturday, July 6, 2019
EF#	Location	County / Parish	State	Start Coord.	Time (UTC)	Path length	Max width
EF0	Mount Laurel	Burlington	NJ	39.9417°N 74.9462°W	18:07–18:08	0.07 mi (0.11 km)	5 yd (4.6 m)
EF0	Surveillance footage showed a short-lived tornado overturning a car in a parking lot and causing minor roof damage at an adjacent warehouse.						
EF1	S of Bosler	Albany	WY	41.5556°N 105.7349°W	00:10–00:19	3.98 mi (6.41 km)	500 yd (460 m)
EF1	Wooden power poles were snapped. A pole barn was demolished. Large pieces of warped metal were tossed several hundred yards.						
EFU	ESE of Chugwater	Goshen	WY	41.7175°N 104.621°W	01:49–01:58	3.61 mi (5.81 km)	20 yd (18 m)
EFU	A storm chaser captured spectacular footage of this tornado, using a remote-controlled drone, one of the first of its kind. The tornado stayed in hilly, remote areas, causing no damage.						

=== July 8 event ===
List of confirmed tornadoes – Monday, July 8, 2019
EF#	Location	County / Parish	State	Start Coord.	Time (UTC)	Path length	Max width
EF0	NW of Hazen	Mercer	ND	47.3164°N 101.652°W	18:52–18:54	0.61 mi (0.98 km)	50 yd (46 m)
EF0	A tornado caused very minor damage.						
EF0	WSW of Martin	Sheridan	ND	47.7666°N 100.3466°W	19:46–19:48	0.53 mi (0.85 km)	50 yd (46 m)
EF0	A tornado caused very minor damage.						
EF0	E of Cando	Towner	ND	48.49°N 99°W	21:06–21:07	0.2 mi (0.32 km)	50 yd (46 m)
EF0	A trained storm spotter reported a tornado.						
EF0	S of Calio	Cavalier	ND	48.55°N 98.94°W	21:32–21:35	3.06 mi (4.92 km)	200 yd (180 m)
EF0	Trees and crops were damaged.						
EF0	S of Roseland	Adams	NE	40.4266°N 98.55°W	23:38	0.01 mi (0.016 km)	25 yd (23 m)
EF0	A brief tornado was reported. No damage occurred.						

=== July 9 event ===
List of confirmed tornadoes – Tuesday, July 9, 2019
EF#	Location	County / Parish	State	Start Coord.	Time (UTC)	Path length	Max width
EF1	NW of Walcott	Richland	ND	46.57°N 97.01°W	22:19–22:24	1.5 mi (2.4 km)	100 yd (91 m)
EF1	A short-lived tornado snapped multiple trees.						
EF0	WSW of Wahpeton	Richland	ND	46.2300°N 96.75°W	22:30–22:31	0.2 mi (0.32 km)	50 yd (46 m)
EF0	A brief tornado was observed near Interstate 29; no known damage occurred.						
EF1	N of Breckenridge	Wilkin	MN	46.31°N 96.59°W	22:57–23:03	2 mi (3.2 km)	100 yd (91 m)
EF1	A tornado with twin funnels caused extensive tree damage.						
EF0	S of Rustad	Clay	MN	46.70°N 96.74°W	22:58–23:00	0.5 mi (0.80 km)	75 yd (69 m)
EF0	A tornado with twin funnels caused extensive tree damage.						
EF1	NE of Breckenridge	Wilkin	MN	46.37°N 96.42°W	23:20–23:23	0.95 mi (1.53 km)	150 yd (140 m)
EF1	Several trees were snapped.						
EF0	WSW of Hawley	Clay	MN	46.84°N 96.45°W	23:30–23:38	3 mi (4.8 km)	150 yd (140 m)
EF0	A partially rain-wrapped tornado downed numerous trees.						
EF1	Erhard	Otter Tail	MN	46.47°N 96.14°W	23:45–23:51	2 mi (3.2 km)	150 yd (140 m)
EF1	A tornado snapped or uprooted numerous trees in and around Erhard.						
EFU	S of Plainview	Scott	IA	41.64°N 90.7967°W	00:08–00:09	0.06 mi (0.097 km)	10 yd (9.1 m)
EFU	Iowa state troopers observed a tornado. No damage occurred.						
EFU	SSE of Donahue	Scott	IA	41.6682°N 90.6625°W	00:41–00:42	0.04 mi (0.064 km)	10 yd (9.1 m)
EFU	A trained storm spotter observed a tornado in an open field. No damage occurred.						

=== July 10 event ===
Event was associated with Hurricane Barry.

List of confirmed tornadoes – Wednesday, July 10, 2019
EF#	Location	County / Parish	State	Start Coord.	Time (UTC)	Path length	Max width
EF1	N of French Quarter	Orleans	LA	30.0136°N 90.0821°W	13:26	0.2 mi (0.32 km)	50 yd (46 m)
EF1	One house had a large part of its roof ripped off while several others suffered minor damage from wind-blown debris. A couple of trees were snapped.						

=== July 11 event ===
List of confirmed tornadoes – Thursday, July 11, 2019
EF#	Location	County / Parish	State	Start Coord.	Time (UTC)	Path length	Max width
EF1	Mount Laurel	Burlington	NJ	39.9309°N 74.9411°W	23:18–23:21	1.27 mi (2.04 km)	150 yd (140 m)
EF1	The tornado caused extensive tree damage across the town. One home and several apartment buildings had minor soffit and gutter damage.						

=== July 12 event ===
List of confirmed tornadoes – Friday, July 12, 2019
EF#	Location	County / Parish	State	Start Coord.	Time (UTC)	Path length	Max width
EFU	N of Sydney	Cheyenne	NE	41.2339°N 102.9801°W	00:02–00:09	1.18 mi (1.90 km)	20 yd (18 m)
EFU	A tornado was reported by a storm chaser. No damage occurred.						
EF1	NNW of Mott	Hettinger	ND	46.4003°N 102.3448°W	03:24–03:32	2.9 mi (4.7 km)	200 yd (180 m)
EF1	Farm bins and a home's attached garage were shifted off their foundations, the roof was ripped off a storage facility, and a shed was destroyed.						

=== July 14 event ===
Event was associated with Hurricane Barry.

List of confirmed tornadoes – Sunday, July 14, 2019
EF#	Location	County / Parish	State	Start Coord.	Time (UTC)	Path length	Max width
EF0	NW of Macedonia	Forrest	MS	31.4122°N 89.1959°W	11:25–11:27	0.48 mi (0.77 km)	25 yd (23 m)
EF0	A brief tornado touched down and mostly damaged trees before dissipating.						

=== July 15 event ===
List of confirmed tornadoes – Monday, July 15, 2019
EF#	Location	County / Parish	State	Start Coord.	Time (UTC)	Path length	Max width
EF0	WNW of St. Benedict	Scott	MN	44.5962°N 93.6957°W	00:04–00:06	0.29 mi (0.47 km)	100 yd (91 m)
EF0	A farm was damaged and several trees were uprooted.						

=== July 16 event ===
List of confirmed tornadoes – Tuesday, July 16, 2019
EF#	Location	County / Parish	State	Start Coord.	Time (UTC)	Path length	Max width
EF0	NW of Red Banks	Marshall	MS	34.8162°N 89.6456°W	17:17–17:25	5.29 mi (8.51 km)	75 yd (69 m)
EF0	Several structures sustained minor roof damage. Trees were uprooted, some of which fell on homes. Power lines were downed as well.						
EFU	NW of Cumberland	Cass	IA	41.3122°N 94.9708°W	20:38–20:43	1.41 mi (2.27 km)	30 yd (27 m)
EFU	A tornado was photographed and videoed. No damage occurred.						
EF0	NNE of Hancock	Waushara	WI	44.1736°N 89.4987°W	22:35–22:36	0.15 mi (0.24 km)	10 yd (9.1 m)
EF0	A few small tree branches were lofted in the air.						
EF0	E of Rozet	Campbell	WY	44.2704°N 105.1142°W	01:34–01:44	1.19 mi (1.92 km)	10 yd (9.1 m)
EF0	A trained storm spotter reported a tornado over open areas. No damage occurred.						

=== July 17 event ===
List of confirmed tornadoes – Wednesday, July 17, 2019
EF#	Location	County / Parish	State	Start Coord.	Time (UTC)	Path length	Max width
EFU	NNW of Vetal	Bennett	SD	43.34°N 101.45°W	07:23	0.01 mi (0.016 km)	2 yd (1.8 m)
EFU	Electric linemen observed a brief tornado. No damage occurred.						
EF1	N of Tripp	Hutchinson	SD	43.2559°N 97.9773°W	10:22–10:27	1.69 mi (2.72 km)	50 yd (46 m)
EF1	A tornado damaged three farmsteads; two barns sustained severe damage and the second floor of a home was destroyed.						
EF0	ENE of Gates Corner	Beltrami	MN	48.4800°N 95.2200°W	21:05–21:10	0.25 mi (0.40 km)	25 yd (23 m)
EF0	The public observed a funnel cloud descend very nearly to tree tops within the Red Lake Wildlife Management Area.						
EF1	S of Faunce to S of Baudette	Lake of the Woods	MN	48.5500°N 94.9500°W	21:40–22:10	15 mi (24 km)	100 yd (91 m)
EF1	A tornado tracked intermittently through the Beltrami Island State Forest and caused significant tree damage. However, much of the tornado's path was inaccessible to surveyors.						
EFU	NE of Lusk	Niobrara	WY	42.99°N 104.15°W	00:05–00:08	0.27 mi (0.43 km)	20 yd (18 m)
EFU	Law enforcement reported a tornado. No damage occurred.						
EFU	ESE of Story	Sioux	NE	42.91°N 103.88°W	00:25–00:28	0.94 mi (1.51 km)	20 yd (18 m)
EFU	A trained storm spotter observed a tornado. No damage occurred.						
EF2	W of Four Corners	Weston	WY	44.09°N 104.187°W	00:45–00:58	1.4 mi (2.3 km)	100 yd (91 m)
EF2	Large pine trees were snapped or uprooted.						
EF1	N of Kabetogama, MN	St. Louis (MN), Rainy River (ON)	MN, ON	48.5411°N 92.9993°W	00:49–01:10	4.72 mi (7.60 km)	690 yd (630 m)
EF1	A tornado moved through Voyageurs National Park and crossed the border into Canada causing damage to numerous trees.						
EF1	SE of Orr	St. Louis	MN	47.996°N 92.8542°W	01:01–01:16	5.73 mi (9.22 km)	420 yd (380 m)
EF1	High-resolution satellite imagery and photographs from a storm chaser were used to document a tornado.						
EF0	E of Orr	St. Louis	MN	48.0519°N 92.6779°W	01:23–01:37	5.72 mi (9.21 km)	500 yd (460 m)
EF0	Sporadic tree damage was observed.						

=== July 18 event ===
List of confirmed tornadoes – Thursday, July 18, 2019
EF#	Location	County / Parish	State	Start Coord.	Time (UTC)	Path length	Max width
EFU	NE of Meraux	St. Bernard	LA	30°N 89.86°W	18:55	0.1 mi (0.16 km)	100 yd (91 m)
EFU	An emergency manager reported a large waterspout.						
EF1	WSW of Barnes	Douglas	WI	46.3076°N 91.6082°W	19:29–19:35	1.3 mi (2.1 km)	160 yd (150 m)
EF1	A tornado snapped or uprooted numerous trees.						
EF0	W of Crooks	Minnehaha	SD	43.6463°N 96.8718°W	22:15–22:18	0.41 mi (0.66 km)	5 yd (4.6 m)
EF0	A brief tornado damaged the roof of a barn.						
EF0	E of Witoka	Winona	MN	43.9355°N 91.5095°W	03:33–03:34	0.27 mi (0.43 km)	20 yd (18 m)
EF0	A brief tornado damaged one home and a few trees.						
EF0	NE of Westby	Vernon	WI	43.6952°N 90.7599°W	04:42–04:45	0.48 mi (0.77 km)	25 yd (23 m)
EF0	A tornado destroyed a barn and flipped a trailer. Scattered tree damage occurred.						

=== July 19 event ===
List of confirmed tornadoes – Friday, July 19, 2019
EF#	Location	County / Parish	State	Start Coord.	Time (UTC)	Path length	Max width
EF1	NE of Ridgeway	Carter	MT	45.50°N 104.45°W	06:44	0.5 mi (0.80 km)	100 yd (91 m)
EF1	A farmstead suffered significant damage. A small garage was destroyed, three buildings had significant roof damage, and trees were snapped or uprooted.						
EF0	NW of Turtle Lake	Polk	WI	45.4928°N 92.3098°W	22:28–22:29	0.89 mi (1.43 km)	75 yd (69 m)
EF0	Dozens of trees were downed, some on houses, sheds, and vehicles. A machine shed saw its roof partially removed.						
EF1	E of Balsam Lake to E of Turtle Lake	Polk, Barron	WI	45.4482°N 92.3575°W	22:28–22:48	13.9 mi (22.4 km)	600 yd (550 m)
EF1	Many hundreds of trees were downed, some of which landed on houses, garages, outbuildings, and vehicles. Sheds were collapsed and the roofs were ripped off barns and outbuildings.						
EF0	S of Tripoli	Lincoln	WI	45.551°N 90.0356°W	23:47–00:00	6.52 mi (10.49 km)	50 yd (46 m)
EF0	Scattered trees were damaged.						
EF0	W of Withee	Clark	WI	44.9599°N 90.6797°W	00:17–00:19	0.23 mi (0.37 km)	30 yd (27 m)
EF0	The roof was partially torn off a barn and the top of a silo was ripped off. A pole barn and 15–20 trees were damaged.						
EF1	NWW of Withee	Clark	WI	44.9858°N 90.6116°W	00:24–00:26	0.28 mi (0.45 km)	40 yd (37 m)
EF1	Trees were toppled onto a mobile home. Numerous power poles were snapped or bent.						
EF0	WNW of Pelican Lake	Oneida	WI	45.5377°N 89.3897°W	00:49–00:58	5.42 mi (8.72 km)	50 yd (46 m)
EF0	Scattered tree damage was observed.						
EF1	S of Mosinee	Marathon	WI	44.7499°N 89.7883°W	01:20–01:30	8.97 mi (14.44 km)	100 yd (91 m)
EF1	Dozens of trees and the roof of an outbuilding were damaged. An old barn was demolished.						

=== July 20 event ===
List of confirmed tornadoes – Saturday, July 20, 2019
EF#	Location	County / Parish	State	Start Coord.	Time (UTC)	Path length	Max width
EF0	W of North Bend	Trempealeau	WI	44.0991°N 91.183°W	14:10–14:12	0.86 mi (1.38 km)	50 yd (46 m)
EF0	A brief tornado damaged a corn field and some trees.						
EF0	NE of North Bend	Jackson	WI	44.1071°N 91.0826°W	14:14–14:18	1.63 mi (2.62 km)	50 yd (46 m)
EF0	A brief tornado damaged a corn field and some trees.						
EF1	NW of Weyauwega	Waupaca	WI	44.3332°N 89.0561°W	15:55–16:03	7.55 mi (12.15 km)	80 yd (73 m)
EF1	An apartment complex, in addition to the siding and shingles of six homes, were damaged. The garage door of a newer house was blown in, damaging the roof; another home had a small part of its roof heavily damaged. Numerous trees were also damaged.						
EF0	Southern Weyauwega	Waupaca	WI	44.3115°N 88.9345°W	16:00–16:02	1.35 mi (2.17 km)	50 yd (46 m)
EF0	Several trees were damaged in the southern part of Weyauwega.						
EF1	S of New London	Waupaca, Outagamie	WI	44.3547°N 88.761°W	16:09–16:20	7.54 mi (12.13 km)	90 yd (82 m)
EF1	A storage shed and part of a wooden deck were destroyed. Shingles and siding were ripped off a house, a power pole fell on a car, and trees were heavily damaged.						
EF1	E of Hortonville	Outagamie	WI	44.3294°N 88.5767°W	16:18–16:22	3.51 mi (5.65 km)	75 yd (69 m)
EF1	The carport of an outbuilding was destroyed while two outbuildings themselves were partially damaged. Siding was ripped off a couple of houses. Trees and three power poles were damaged.						
EF0	NE of Greenville	Outagamie	WI	44.3158°N 88.4978°W	16:22–16:23	0.72 mi (1.16 km)	50 yd (46 m)
EF0	Shingles and siding were ripped off a house. A power pole and a few tree limbs were damaged.						
EF0	NE of Kaukauna	Outagamie	WI	44.3026°N 88.2129°W	16:36–16:38	1.11 mi (1.79 km)	50 yd (46 m)
EF0	A silo and the roof of a barn were damaged.						

=== July 21 event ===
List of confirmed tornadoes – Sunday, July 21, 2019
EF#	Location	County / Parish	State	Start Coord.	Time (UTC)	Path length	Max width
EFU	E of Ashkum	Iroquois	IL	40.8531°N 87.8112°W	18:31–18:34	0.4 mi (0.64 km)	25 yd (23 m)
EFU	A tornado was reported. No damage occurred.						

=== July 22 event ===
List of confirmed tornadoes – Monday, July 22, 2019
EF#	Location	County / Parish	State	Start Coord.	Time (UTC)	Path length	Max width
EF0	Westcliffe	Custer	CO	38.2°N 105.46°W	23:30–23:35	0.5 mi (0.80 km)	20 yd (18 m)
EF0	A tornado caused significant damage to canopies, carports, RVs, and gazebos. A few houses lost their shingles, had their metal roofing peeled up, or saw their windows broken by flying debris. One carport awning was carried 100 yd (91 m) and dropped on a roof.						

=== July 23 event ===
List of confirmed tornadoes – Tuesday, July 23, 2019
EF#	Location	County / Parish	State	Start Coord.	Time (UTC)	Path length	Max width
EF1	W of Kalmus	Barnstable	MA	41.6354°N 70.2841°W	15:57–16:07	5.52 mi (8.88 km)	250 yd (230 m)
EF1	A waterspout moved onshore. A Mesonet station observed winds up to 91 mph (146 km/h) during the tornado's passage. In West Yarmouth, a motel had its roof torn completely off. Extensive tree damage occurred just southwest of Dennis-Yarmouth Regional High School with some trees snapped.						
EF1	West Yarmouth	Barnstable	MA	41.6464°N 70.2435°W	16:00–16:01	0.25 mi (0.40 km)	50 yd (46 m)
EF1	A brief tornado touched down in a residential neighborhood, causing damage mainly to trees.						
EF1	Harwich	Barnstable	MA	41.6851°N 70.0789°W	16:10–16:15	2.77 mi (4.46 km)	250 yd (230 m)
EF1	A waterspout moved onshore south-southwest of Harwich, moving through the community and through Harwich Center. Approximately 150 hardwood trees were snapped or uprooted and several homes lost shingles.						
EF0	Willow Springs	Wake	NC	35.5943°N 78.7405°W	18:34–18:36	1.24 mi (2.00 km)	175 yd (160 m)
EF0	A brief tornado snapped or uprooted several trees. One home suffered minor siding and shingle damage.						
EF1	SW of Clayton	Johnston	NC	35.5915°N 78.5383°W	19:00–19:01	0.22 mi (0.35 km)	100 yd (91 m)
EF1	A brief tornado caused minor shingle damage to several homes and snapped softwood trees. A few pieces of lawn furniture were lofted significant distances.						

=== July 25 event ===
List of confirmed tornadoes – Thursday, July 25, 2019
EF#	Location	County / Parish	State	Start Coord.	Time (UTC)	Path length	Max width
EF0	S of Christiansted	Saint Croix	USVI	17.7212°N 64.7151°W	13:57	0.5 mi (0.80 km)	5 yd (4.6 m)
EF0	A tornado was observed by a member of the public.						
EF0	Haverhill	Palm Beach	FL	26.6892°N 80.1264°W	19:49–19:52	0.1 mi (0.16 km)	5 yd (4.6 m)
EF0	Tree limbs were downed and a mailbox was broken.						

=== July 26 event ===
List of confirmed tornadoes – Friday, July 26, 2019
EF#	Location	County / Parish	State	Start Coord.	Time (UTC)	Path length	Max width
EF0	NE of Port Isabel	Cameron	TX	26.1064°N 97.1635°W	20:15	0.01 mi (0.016 km)	15 yd (14 m)
EF0	Beach umbrellas and tents were displaced by a waterspout that moved onshore.						

=== July 27 event ===
List of confirmed tornadoes – Saturday, July 27, 2019
EF#	Location	County / Parish	State	Start Coord.	Time (UTC)	Path length	Max width
EF0	NNE of Lajas	Lajas	PR	18.0397°N 67.0164°W	01:15	0.5 mi (0.80 km)	1 yd (0.91 m)
EF0	A plantain farm, a poultry house, and the roof of a home were damaged; animals were reported missing from the poultry house. An electrical pole and a tree were downed.						

=== July 28 event ===
List of confirmed tornadoes – Thursday, July 28, 2019
EF#	Location	County / Parish	State	Start Coord.	Time (UTC)	Path length	Max width
EF1	W of Michigan	Nelson	ND	48.02°N 98.25°W	19:23–19:32	3.82 mi (6.15 km)	100 yd (91 m)
EF1	A small pole shed was destroyed, shingles were ripped off a roof at a farmstead, and a couple of trees were snapped.						
EF0	NW of Biscay	McLeod	MN	44.8053°N 94.3299°W	20:17–20:26	3.99 mi (6.42 km)	200 yd (180 m)
EF0	Corn was flatted along the path and some trees were uprooted.						
EF0	SSE of Silver Lake	McLeod	MN	44.8555°N 94.1804°W	20:32–20:33	0.28 mi (0.45 km)	25 yd (23 m)
EF0	Some trees were damaged.						
EF1	SE of Silver Lake	McLeod	MN	44.8828°N 94.1691°W	20:36–20:42	2.63 mi (4.23 km)	440 yd (400 m)
EF1	Corn was flattened, a few outbuildings were destroyed, and many trees were damaged.						
EF1	E of Forest Lake	Washington, Chisago	MN	45.2478°N 92.9020°W	21:28–21:47	8.16 mi (13.13 km)	440 yd (400 m)
EF1	Numerous trees were snapped or uprooted, a few of which caused roof damage. Corn was flattened and a storage shed had its roof blown off. A solar panel farm, an outdoor wedding venue, and a farm shed damaged. An outbuilding was destroyed.						
EF0	ESE of Balsam Lake	Polk	WI	45.5195°N 92.3955°W	22:31–22:38	4.78 mi (7.69 km)	100 yd (91 m)
EF0	Hundreds of trees were downed, some of which landed on houses, sheds, and vehicles. The roofs were ripped off a barn, a machine shed, and outbuildings. A silo was knocked over.						
EF0	ENE of Hillsdale	Barron	WI	45.329°N 91.7909°W	23:41–23:42	0.43 mi (0.69 km)	25 yd (23 m)
EF0	A large storage shed saw part of its roof ripped off and garage doors blown in. A few trees were knocked over.						
EFU	NW of Lake Andes	Charles Mix	SD	43.1938°N 98.6163°W	01:53–01:56	1.24 mi (2.00 km)	10 yd (9.1 m)
EFU	Law enforcement reported a tornado in open fields. No damage occurred.						
EF0	ESE of Butte	Boyd	NE	42.91°N 98.81°W	02:10	0.04 mi (0.064 km)	30 yd (27 m)
EF0	A brief tornado occurred in an open field. No damage was observed.						

=== July 30 event ===
List of confirmed tornadoes – Saturday, July 30, 2019
EF#	Location	County / Parish	State	Start Coord.	Time (UTC)	Path length	Max width
EF0	Chandler	Maricopa	AZ	33.26°N 111.82°W	23:30–23:32	0.95 mi (1.53 km)	50 yd (46 m)
EF0	A very weak landspout was observed on video.						

== August ==
Confirmed tornadoes by Enhanced Fujita rating
EFU	EF0	EF1	EF2	EF3	EF4	EF5	Total
11	45	21	0	1	0	0	78

=== August 2 event ===
List of confirmed tornadoes – Friday, August 2, 2019
EF#	Location	County / Parish	State	Start Coord.	Time (UTC)	Path length	Max width
EF0	E of Rupert	Cassia	ID	42.6165°N 113.5521°W	19:55–20:05	1 mi (1.6 km)	10 yd (9.1 m)
EF0	An NWS employee photographed a tornado over open lands. No damage occurred.						

=== August 4 event ===
List of confirmed tornadoes – Sunday, August 4, 2019
EF#	Location	County / Parish	State	Start Coord.	Time (UTC)	Path length	Max width
EF0	Cudjoe Key	Monroe	FL	24.6483°N 81.4806°W	23:20–23:21	0.09 mi (0.14 km)	20 yd (18 m)
EF0	A small piece of vinyl siding was ripped from a waterfront home. A few palm fronds were downed.						

=== August 5 event ===
List of confirmed tornadoes – Monday, August 5, 2019
EF#	Location	County / Parish	State	Start Coord.	Time (UTC)	Path length	Max width
EF0	Surf City	Pender	NC	34.4299°N 77.5491°W	14:13–14:14	0.1 mi (0.16 km)	20 yd (18 m)
EF0	Two RVs suffered minor damage, and two property owners were injured.						
EF1	WSW of Dubuque	Dubuque	IA	42.3863°N 90.7796°W	03:07–03:08	0.3 mi (0.48 km)	50 yd (46 m)
EF1	A brie caused damage to corn, trees and houses along its path. Two houses sustained partial roof removal, and another was damaged by a fallen tree.						

=== August 6 event ===
List of confirmed tornadoes – Tuesday, August 6, 2019
EF#	Location	County / Parish	State	Start Coord.	Time (UTC)	Path length	Max width
EF1	Southern Norwalk	Huron	OH	41.2226°N 82.6106°W	21:20–21:21	1.5 mi (2.4 km)	50 yd (46 m)
EF1	The tornado damaged or downed multiple trees in the southern part of Norwalk.						
EF1	Burke	Gregory	SD	43.1833°N 99.2911°W	03:25–03:33	3.82 mi (6.15 km)	75 yd (69 m)
EF1	Several buildings at a lumber yard in Burke were demolished, a civic center was destroyed, and a school sustained significant damage. A garage collapsed, injuring two people who were moving vehicles to cover. Numerous power poles and lines were toppled. One home suffered severe roof damage, while others sustained lesser damage. Up to 3,000 trees were damaged.						

=== August 7 event ===
List of confirmed tornadoes – Wednesday, August 7, 2019
EF#	Location	County / Parish	State	Start Coord.	Time (UTC)	Path length	Max width
EF0	Springfield	Union	NJ	40.6844°N 74.3299°W	18:47–18:48	0.1 mi (0.16 km)	100 yd (91 m)
EF0	Metal scaffolding was ripped from a three-story roof. The roof of a commercial building sustained major damage. Solar panels, bricks, several cars, an air conditioner, and a large transformer were damaged as well.						
EF0	SW of Hampstead	Pender	NC	34.33°N 77.75°W	19:45–19:46	0.1 mi (0.16 km)	20 yd (18 m)
EF0	A brief tornado caused minor tree damage.						
EF0	Hightstown	Mercer	NJ	40.2139°N 74.5485°W	20:33–20:34	0.33 mi (0.53 km)	25 yd (23 m)
EF0	The glass roof of a greenhouse was shattered, with shards of glass blown for hundreds of yards and cleanly pierced through the doors and walls of a nearby barn. A few metal support beams were tossed up to 200 yd (180 m). Shards of glass, flower planters, and support beams were also scattered from a barn. Several tree limbs were snapped, and one woman was injured by flying glass.						
EF0	Millville	Cumberland	NJ	39.3759°N 75.0332°W	22:40–22:41	0.1 mi (0.16 km)	10 yd (9.1 m)
EF0	A couple of trees and several rows of solar panels were damaged, and one tree was snapped.						
EF0	SSE of Green Bay to Bellevue	Brown	WI	44.4952°N 87.988°W	22:48–22:57	6.2 mi (10.0 km)	90 yd (82 m)
EF0	Three power poles and a business sign were heavily damaged. A poorly constructed carport had a portion of its metal roof ripped off, and a nearby house lost a couple of shingles. At least 100 trees were damaged.						

=== August 8 event ===
List of confirmed tornadoes – Thursday, August 8, 2019
EF#	Location	County / Parish	State	Start Coord.	Time (UTC)	Path length	Max width
EFU	Black Forest	El Paso	CO	38.98°N 104.61°W	22:29–22:36	0.5 mi (0.80 km)	10 yd (9.1 m)
EFU	Storm chasers observed a tornado; no damage was reported.						

=== August 9 event ===
List of confirmed tornadoes – Friday, August 9, 2019
EF#	Location	County / Parish	State	Start Coord.	Time (UTC)	Path length	Max width
EF0	NW of Delaplaine	Clay	AR	36.2767°N 90.7434°W	18:22–18:25	0.19 mi (0.31 km)	50 yd (46 m)
EF0	A crop duster pilot sighted a landspout tornado. No damage occurred.						
EF0	WNW of Fort Thompson	Lyman	SD	44.07°N 99.78°W	21:58–21:59	0.09 mi (0.14 km)	10 yd (9.1 m)
EF0	A storm chaser reported a brief tornado; no damage occurred.						
EF0	N of Darling	Quitman	MS	34.3776°N 90.2788°W	23:00–23:02	0.09 mi (0.14 km)	50 yd (46 m)
EF0	A landspout tornado was reported by the public. No damage occurred.						
EF1	Bella Vista	Pulaski	VA	37.102°N 80.780°W	00:10–00:11	0.25 mi (0.40 km)	50 yd (46 m)
EF1	A brief tornado snapped or uprooted numerous trees within a larger area of straight-line wind damage. Multiple outbuildings and a large equipment shed were destroyed, including vehicles inside the shed.						

=== August 10 event ===
List of confirmed tornadoes – Saturday, August 10, 2019
EF#	Location	County / Parish	State	Start Coord.	Time (UTC)	Path length	Max width
EF0	N of Three Points	Pima	AZ	32.1153°N 111.3196°W	20:00–20:03	0.17 mi (0.27 km)	10 yd (9.1 m)
EF0	A storm chaser sighted a landspout tornado.						
EF0	Windom	Cottonwood	MN	43.8698°N 95.1275°W	23:06–23:14	1.42 mi (2.29 km)	50 yd (46 m)
EF0	Trees in town, as well as the roof of a barn, were damaged. A small metal shed was displaced, and a small corn crib holding aluminum cans for recycling was overturned.						
EF0	SE of Fairmont	Martin	MN	43.61°N 94.41°W	23:36–23:37	0.02 mi (0.032 km)	25 yd (23 m)
EF0	A storm spotter reported a brief tornado; no damage occurred.						

=== August 11 event ===
List of confirmed tornadoes – Sunday, August 11, 2019
EF#	Location	County / Parish	State	Start Coord.	Time (UTC)	Path length	Max width
EFU	S of Hillsdale	Laramie	WY	41.16°N 104.48°W	20:54–20:58	1.3 mi (2.1 km)	50 yd (46 m)
EFU	A landspout tornado knocked over a wind break fence.						
EF0	NE of Akron	Washington	CO	40.1897°N 103.1425°W	21:04–21:05	0.01 mi (0.016 km)	25 yd (23 m)
EF0	A storm chaser reported a tornado that did not cause damage.						
EF0	NE of Akron	Washington	CO	40.2274°N 103.0929°W	21:26–21:27	0.01 mi (0.016 km)	25 yd (23 m)
EF0	A trained storm spotter reported a tornado. No damage occurred.						
EF0	E of Otis	Washington	CO	40.1598°N 102.9227°W	21:59–22:00	0.01 mi (0.016 km)	25 yd (23 m)
EF0	A trained storm spotter sighted a tornado. No damage occurred.						
EF0	E of Otis	Washington	CO	40.1589°N 102.883°W	22:03–22:04	0.01 mi (0.016 km)	25 yd (23 m)
EF0	A trained storm spotter observed a tornado in an open field. No damage occurred.						
EFU	S of Clarkville	Yuma	CO	40.2819°N 102.6236°W	22:04	0.01 mi (0.016 km)	50 yd (46 m)
EFU	A brief tornado was observed. No damage occurred.						
EF0	NNW of Hyde	Washington	CO	40.165°N 102.8515°W	22:09–22:10	0.01 mi (0.016 km)	25 yd (23 m)
EF0	A trained storm spotter sighted a tornado in an open field. No damage occurred.						
EF1	NW of Yuma	Washington, Yuma	CO	40.1836°N 102.7939°W	22:10–22:20	0.12 mi (0.19 km)	200 yd (180 m)
EF1	A few power lines were snapped.						
EF1	WSW of Wauneta	Yuma	CO	40.2481°N 102.3616°W	22:59–23:01	1.58 mi (2.54 km)	100 yd (91 m)
EF1	A tornado snapped or uprooted several trees.						
EFU	NW of Parks	Dundy	NE	40.1523°N 101.8538°W	00:33	0.01 mi (0.016 km)	50 yd (46 m)
EFU	A storm chaser reported a brief tornado.						
EF1	SE of Wheeler	Cheyenne	KS	39.6813°N 101.6576°W	00:47–00:52	1.23 mi (1.98 km)	175 yd (160 m)
EF1	A sturdy farm outbuilding and several lean-to shelters collapsed. Farm machinery was damaged either from flying debris, being tossed, or tornadic winds. Many fences were toppled, and a grain bin was blown more than 0.1 mi (0.16 km) away. Trees were snapped and uprooted.						
EFU	S of Beardsley	Rawlins	KS	39.7754°N 101.2539°W	01:57–01:59	0.95 mi (1.53 km)	50 yd (46 m)
EFU	A storm chaser reported a tornado.						

=== August 12 event ===
List of confirmed tornadoes – Monday, August 12, 2019
EF#	Location	County / Parish	State	Start Coord.	Time (UTC)	Path length	Max width
EF1	NW of Graysville	Sullivan	IN	39.1347°N 87.6159°W	16:44–16:47	1.72 mi (2.77 km)	100 yd (91 m)
EF1	Multiple corn fields and areas of trees were damaged.						
EF1	W of Topsfield	Washington	ME	45.417°N 67.955°W	21:43–21:44	0.21 mi (0.34 km)	200 yd (180 m)
EF1	Approximately 120 trees were snapped or uprooted.						
EF0	W of Max	McLean	ND	47.82°N 101.48°W	00:40–00:41	0.45 mi (0.72 km)	30 yd (27 m)
EF0	Tree branches were broken.						
EF1	ESE of Edinburg	Christian	IL	39.6475°N 89.3382°W	02:08–02:21	6.25 mi (10.06 km)	200 yd (180 m)
EF1	An extensive area of corn was flattened. Half the roof was ripped off a machine shed, and the roof of a house was damaged too. Numerous trees were damaged or snapped. Two semi-trailers were tipped over.						
EF0	N of Assumption	Christian, Shelby	IL	39.5356°N 89.0517°W	02:40–02:44	1.91 mi (3.07 km)	75 yd (69 m)
EF0	Several large tree limbs were broken, one of which punctured the roof of a home. Significant crop damage was observed.						

=== August 13 event ===
List of confirmed tornadoes – Tuesday, August 13, 2019
EF#	Location	County / Parish	State	Start Coord.	Time (UTC)	Path length	Max width
EF0	S of Henning	Otter Tail	MN	46.28°N 95.44°W	19:25	0.25 mi (0.40 km)	100 yd (91 m)
EF0	Hay was tossed onto power lines.						
EF0	SE of Abarr	Yuma	CO	39.785°N 102.656°W	19:55–20:05	2.18 mi (3.51 km)	100 yd (91 m)
EF0	A trained storm spotter observed two simultaneous tornadoes.						
EF0	SE of Abarr	Yuma	CO	39.771°N 102.609°W	20:00–20:15	3.53 mi (5.68 km)	100 yd (91 m)
EF0	A trained storm spotter observed two simultaneous tornadoes.						
EF0	NE of Stratton	Kit Carson	CO	39.436°N 102.523°W	20:46–21:05	5.27 mi (8.48 km)	100 yd (91 m)
EF0	A storm chaser reported a rain-wrapped tornado.						
EF0	S of Lemond	Steele	MN	43.9761°N 93.3639°W	21:24–21:34	5.89 mi (9.48 km)	25 yd (23 m)
EF0	A soybean field suffered minor damage. A portable hoop barn was tossed across a field.						
EF0	SSE of Farmington	Dakota	MN	44.5721°N 93.1216°W	22:03–22:04	0.32 mi (0.51 km)	25 yd (23 m)
EF0	A few trees were snapped or uprooted.						

=== August 15 event ===
List of confirmed tornadoes – Thursday, August 15, 2019
EF#	Location	County / Parish	State	Start Coord.	Time (UTC)	Path length	Max width
EF0	S of Lake City	Marshall	SD	45.6903°N 97.4166°W	22:19–22:21	0.3 mi (0.48 km)	75 yd (69 m)
EF0	A waterspout formed over Roy Lake and quickly moved ashore, flipping a pontoon and causing minor tree damage. One outbuilding sustained minor damage. A piece of lawn furniture was tossed over 150 yd (140 m).						
EFU	E of Ogden	Riley	KS	39.1097°N 96.6804°W	00:34–00:36	1.37 mi (2.20 km)	25 yd (23 m)
EFU	A storm chaser reported a tornado.						
EFU	WNW of Volland	Geary, Wabaunsee	KS	38.965°N 96.5074°W	01:05–01:15	3.8 mi (6.1 km)	50 yd (46 m)
EFU	Storm chasers reported a tornado. Minor tree damage was reported, but it may have been the result of non-tornadic winds.						
EF1	NE of Alta Vista	Wabaunsee	KS	38.9226°N 96.3442°W	01:34–01:53	6.73 mi (10.83 km)	150 yd (140 m)
EF1	Well-constructed renovated barns were damaged.						
EFU	SE of Volland	Wabaunsee	KS	38.8793°N 96.314°W	01:41–01:48	1.6 mi (2.6 km)	25 yd (23 m)
EFU	Law enforcement reported two small tornadoes over open pastureland.						
EFU	E of Alta Vista	Wabaunsee	KS	38.8676°N 96.3757°W	02:25–02:29	2.55 mi (4.10 km)	25 yd (23 m)
EFU	Law enforcement reported two small tornadoes over open pastureland.						

=== August 17 event ===
List of confirmed tornadoes – Saturday, August 17, 2019
EF#	Location	County / Parish	State	Start Coord.	Time (UTC)	Path length	Max width
EF1	W of Rock Rapids	Lyon	IA	43.4212°N 96.2725°W	03:34–03:43	6.95 mi (11.18 km)	75 yd (69 m)
EF1	A silo was flattened, a grain bin and large trees sustained significant damage, and roofing was ripped from a home and two livestock sheds. Several power transmission poles were broken.						
EF1	N of Hadley	Murray	MN	43.9877°N 95.8831°W	03:54–04:01	3.94 mi (6.34 km)	75 yd (69 m)
EF1	Two garages and a barn were destroyed. A metal outbuilding had its roof ripped off. A home had its door blown in and a 2x4 driven through its siding. The door was also blown in at a metal outbuilding which had its roof damaged. Numerous trees and a power transmission pole were damaged.						
EF0	S of Iona	Murray	MN	43.9071°N 95.7834°W	03:59–04:01	0.79 mi (1.27 km)	50 yd (46 m)
EF0	A brief tornado flattened corn stalks, snapped three trees, and toppled several headstones at a cemetery.						
EF0	N of Reading	Nobles	MN	43.7162°N 95.7486°W	03:59–04:03	4.01 mi (6.45 km)	40 yd (37 m)
EF0	A tornado caused minor roof damage to one home and snapped branches off of multiple trees.						
EF0	W of Lake Shetek	Murray	MN	44.1095°N 95.7834°W	04:08–04:10	0.93 mi (1.50 km)	50 yd (46 m)
EF0	A brief tornado flattened corn stalks, damaged trees, and destroyed an old barn.						
EF0	NW of Currie	Murray	MN	44.1313°N 95.7583°W	04:14–04:16	1.15 mi (1.85 km)	50 yd (46 m)
EF0	A brief tornado flattened corn stalks and damaged the metal roofing panels of three farm outbuildings.						
EF0	W of Windom	Cottonwood	MN	43.86°N 95.2617°W	04:25–04:26	0.51 mi (0.82 km)	20 yd (18 m)
EF0	A brief tornado flattened corn stalks.						

=== August 18 event ===
List of confirmed tornadoes – Sunday, August 18, 2019
EF#	Location	County / Parish	State	Start Coord.	Time (UTC)	Path length	Max width
EF0	SSW of Grand Mound	Clinton	IA	41.7858°N 90.6632°W	10:40–10:41	0.1 mi (0.16 km)	20 yd (18 m)
EF0	A brief tornado developed within a convergent downburst. One home had minor roofing and siding damage. One tree was uprooted on the property.						

=== August 20 event ===
List of confirmed tornadoes – Tuesday, August 20, 2019
EF#	Location	County / Parish	State	Start Coord.	Time (UTC)	Path length	Max width
EF1	S of Van Meter	Madison	IA	41.4857°N 93.9316°W	10:21–10:23	1.24 mi (2.00 km)	150 yd (140 m)
EF1	A brief tornado produced minor to moderate damage to trees and one residence.						
EF3	NW of Lacona	Warren	IA	41.2582°N 93.5239°W	10:55–11:00	5.4 mi (8.7 km)	710 yd (650 m)
EF3	A tornado touched down near a farm, displacing a grain bin and causing minor tree damage. It tracked generally east-southeast and struck the Iowa Operator Engineers Training Facility. There, multiple large metal warehouse buildings with I-beam construction were completely destroyed, with debris strewn 0.25 mi (0.40 km) away. In some instances, metal floor footings were pulled out from concrete. Thereafter, the tornado tracked through predominantly rural areas, causing minor damage to several farmsteads.						
EF1	SSE of Harvey	Marion	IA	41.2693°N 92.9008°W	11:21–11:23	1.58 mi (2.54 km)	120 yd (110 m)
EF1	Trees, crops, and buildings suffered minor damage.						

=== August 21 event ===
List of confirmed tornadoes – Wednesday, August 21, 2019
EF#	Location	County / Parish	State	Start Coord.	Time (UTC)	Path length	Max width
EF0	Northern Johnstown	Fulton	NY	43.02°N 74.38°W	18:24–18:27	0.51 mi (0.82 km)	150 yd (140 m)
EF0	A brief tornado uprooted trees in the northern part of Johnstown.						
EF1	E of Saratoga Springs	Saratoga	NY	43.082°N 73.742°W	19:35–19:38	0.38 mi (0.61 km)	75 yd (69 m)
EF1	A brief tornado caused extensive tree damage and tore the roof off a barn.						
EF1	Windham	Windham	VT	43.19°N 72.73°W	21:05–21:10	0.75 mi (1.21 km)	350 yd (320 m)
EF1	A brief tornado caused shingle and siding damage to multiple homes in Windham. Debris and outdoor furniture were tossed hundreds of yards, and numerous trees were snapped or uprooted.						
EF0	SW of Decatur	Macon	IL	39.8181°N 89.0091°W	00:59–01:00	0.13 mi (0.21 km)	10 yd (9.1 m)
EF0	A few tree branches were damaged.						

=== August 22 event ===
List of confirmed tornadoes – Thursday, August 22, 2019
EF#	Location	County / Parish	State	Start Coord.	Time (UTC)	Path length	Max width
EF0	NW of Roggen	Weld	CO	40.19°N 104.40°W	21:34–21:40	0.02 mi (0.032 km)	50 yd (46 m)
EF0	A storm chaser reported a weak tornado over an open field. No damage occurred.						

=== August 23 event ===
List of confirmed tornadoes – Friday, August 23, 2019
EF#	Location	County / Parish	State	Start Coord.	Time (UTC)	Path length	Max width
EF0	N of Bar Nunn	Natrona	WY	42.93°N 106.35°W	22:22–22:25	0.83 mi (1.34 km)	30 yd (27 m)
EF0	Local law enforcement reported a brief landspout tornado over open country. No damage occurred.						
EF0	E of Beaver	Beaver	OK	36.7969°N 100.3509°W	01:10–01:20	1.93 mi (3.11 km)	50 yd (46 m)
EF0	The roofs of a barn and a house, in addition to the porch of the home, were damaged. An outbuilding was destroyed. Significant tree damage was observed.						
EF0	SW of Kit Carson	Cheyenne	CO	38.69°N 102.8°W	01:31–01:33	0.01 mi (0.016 km)	10 yd (9.1 m)
EF0	A trained spotter reported a brief landspout tornado.						

=== August 24 event ===
List of confirmed tornadoes – Saturday, August 24, 2019
EF#	Location	County / Parish	State	Start Coord.	Time (UTC)	Path length	Max width
EFU	N of Claflin	Barton	KS	38.64°N 98.54°W	02:24–02:25	0.67 mi (1.08 km)	25 yd (23 m)
EFU	Local law enforcement reported a brief tornado in open country; no damage occurred.						

=== August 26 event ===
List of confirmed tornadoes – Monday, August 26, 2019
EF#	Location	County / Parish	State	Start Coord.	Time (UTC)	Path length	Max width
EFU	WNW of Kentland	Newton	IN	40.7855°N 87.4889°W	20:59–21:00	0.41 mi (0.66 km)	50 yd (46 m)
EFU	A storm chaser reported a brief tornado in a field. No damage occurred.						
EF0	ESE of Hillman	Mille Lacs	MN	45.9851°N 93.7478°W	23:43–23:52	2.97 mi (4.78 km)	50 yd (46 m)
EF0	A tornado shifted a garage off its foundation, pushed over a barn, and caused minor tree damage.						
EF0	N of Bennettville	Aitkin	MN	46.4339°N 93.7791°W	00:05–00:12	1.8 mi (2.9 km)	30 yd (27 m)
EF0	A waterspout moved across shorelines of Farm Island Lake, damaging docks, several boats, and trees.						
EF1	ESE of Milaca	Mille Lacs	MN	45.7307°N 93.5849°W	00:39–00:48	2.31 mi (3.72 km)	50 yd (46 m)
EF1	A tornado destroyed a large pole barn and ripped about half the roof decking from a home. Dozens of trees were snapped or uprooted.						
EF1	NW of Mulhall	Logan	OK	36.105°N 97.443°W	01:12–01:19	2.2 mi (3.5 km)	50 yd (46 m)
EF1	A shop building was destroyed and trees were damaged.						
EF1	SSW of Seward	Logan, Oklahoma	OK	35.771°N 97.496°W	01:55–02:01	3.52 mi (5.66 km)	500 yd (460 m)
EF1	One home had a large portion of its roof removed and multiple trees were snapped or uprooted.						

=== August 29 event ===
List of confirmed tornadoes – Thursday, August 29, 2019
EF#	Location	County / Parish	State	Start Coord.	Time (UTC)	Path length	Max width
EF1	WNW of Hayes Center	Hayes	NE	40.56°N 101.16°W	22:25–22:26	0.1 mi (0.16 km)	20 yd (18 m)
EF1	A brief tornado damaged trees and a metal garage.						
EF0	W of Hayes Center	Hayes	NE	40.5101°N 101.1751°W	22:30–22:35	1.3 mi (2.1 km)	20 yd (18 m)
EF0	A brief tornado caused minor tree damage.						
EF0	ENE of Hamlet	Hayes	NE	40.43°N 101.09°W	22:45	0.1 mi (0.16 km)	20 yd (18 m)
EF0	A brief tornado occurred over open fields; no damage occurred.						
EF0	S of New Lothrop	Shiawassee	MI	43.103°N 83.971°W	01:23–01:25	2.49 mi (4.01 km)	125 yd (114 m)
EF0	A tornado destroyed a pole barn and a garage, while two homes suffered shingle damage and a third sustained structural damage. A propane tank was also moved.						

== See also ==
- Tornadoes of 2019
- List of United States tornadoes in May 2019
- List of United States tornadoes from September to October 2019
