= Gilmer Park, Indiana =

- Unincorporated community
- Location within Indiana Location within the United States
- Coordinates: 41°36′52″N 86°14′58″W
- Country: United States
- State: Indiana
- County: St. Joseph
- Township: Centre
- Elevation: 840 ft (260 m)
- Time zone: UTC-5 (Eastern (EST))
  - Summer (DST): UTC-4 (EDT)
- ZIP code: 46614
- Area code: 574
- GNIS feature ID: 2830522

Gilmer Park is an unincorporated community in Centre Township, St. Joseph County, in the U.S. state of Indiana.

The community is a subdivision of the nearby CDP of Gulivoire Park, and is part of the South Bend–Mishawaka IN-MI, Metropolitan Statistical Area.

== Demographics ==
The United States Census Bureau first delineated Gilmer Park as a census designated place in the 2022 American Community Survey.
