= Evergreen Hill =

- U.S. National Register of Historic Places
- U.S. Historic district
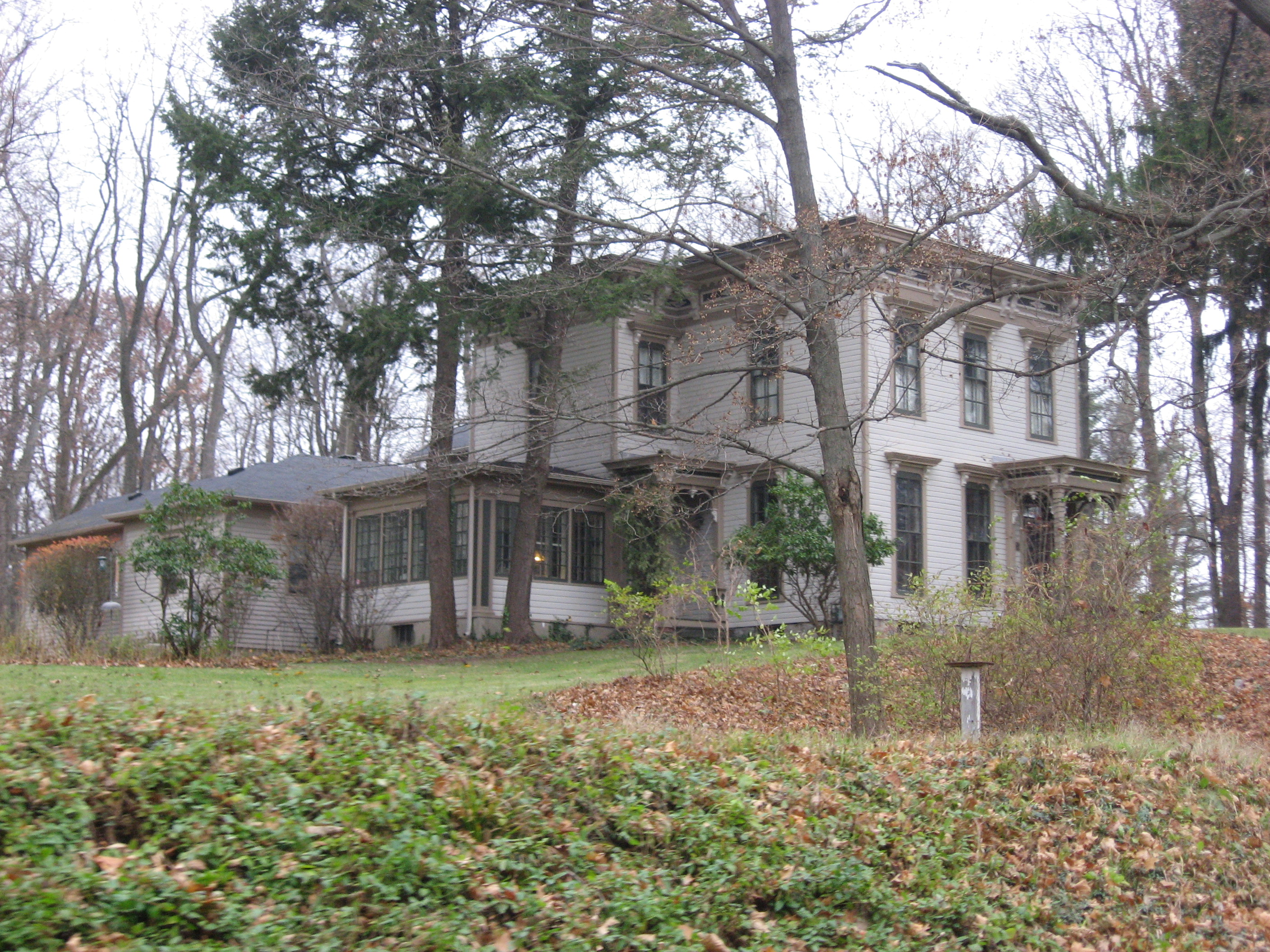
- Evergreen Hill farmhouse, November 2013

- Location within Indiana Location within the United States
- Location: 59449 Keria Trail, south of South Bend in Centre Township, St. Joseph County, Indiana
- Coordinates: 41°37′52″N 86°16′11″W
- Area: 38 acres (15 ha)a
- Built: 1873, 1875, 1918
- Architectural style: Italianate
- NRHP reference No.: 01000410
- Added to NRHP: April 25, 2001

Evergreen Hill is a historic home and farm and national historic district located in Centre Township, St. Joseph County, Indiana. The house was built in 1873, and is a two-story, Italianate style balloon frame dwelling with a 1 1/2-story kitchen addition. A sunroom was added in 1918. It has a low-pitched hipped roof and is sheathed in clapboard siding. Also on the property are the contributing large frame shed, smokehouse, English barn, garage, and small family cemetery.

It was listed on the National Register of Historic Places in 2001.
