= Centre Township, St. Joseph County, Indiana =

Centre Township
- Township
- Seal

- Location in St. Joseph County
- Coordinates: 41°37′31″N 86°15′01″W
- Country: United States
- State: Indiana
- County: St. Joseph
- Organized: 1831

Government
  - Type: Indiana township
  - Trustee: Judith Galloway

Area
  - Total: 19.35 sq mi (50.11 km^{2})
  - Land: 19.33 sq mi (50.07 km^{2})
  - Water: 0.012 sq mi (0.03 km^{2}) 0.06%
- Elevation: 827 ft (252 m)

Population (2020)
  - Total: 14,368
  - Density: 736/sq mi (284.3/km^{2})
- Time zone: UTC-5 (Eastern (EST))
  - Summer (DST): UTC-4 (EDT)
- ZIP code: 46614
- Area code: 574
- GNIS feature ID: 452853
- Website: centretownshipin.gov

Centre Township is one of thirteen townships in St. Joseph County, in the U.S. state of Indiana. As of the 2020 census, its population was 14,368, up from 14,350 at the 2010 census.

== Geography ==
According to the United States Census Bureau, Centre Township covers an area of 19.35 square miles (50.1 km^{2}); of this, 19.33 square miles (50.1 km^{2}) (99.92 percent) is land and 0.01 square miles (0.026 km^{2}) (0.06 percent) is water.

=== Cities, towns, villages ===
- Gulivoire Park
- South Bend (partial)

=== Unincorporated towns ===
- Crest Manor Addition at 41.616437°N 86.233339°W
- Gilmer Park at 41.61977°N 86.251673°W
- Miami Trails Addition at 41.598937°N 86.236117°W
- Orchard Heights Addition at 41.601715°N 86.239728°W

(This list is based on USGS data and may include former settlements.)

=== Adjacent townships ===
- Portage Township (north)
- Penn Township (east)
- Madison Township (southeast)
- Union Township (south)
- Greene Township (west)

=== Cemeteries ===
The township contains these four cemeteries: Mount Calvary, Southlawn, Southlawn and Van Buskirk.

=== Major highways ===
- US 20
- US 31

=== Landmarks ===
- Erskine Plaza
- Evergreen Hill was listed on the National Register of Historic Places in 2001.

== School districts ==
- South Bend Community School Corporation

== Political districts ==
- Indiana's 2nd congressional district
- State House District 6
- State House District 7
- State Senate District 9
