= Gulivoire Park, Indiana =

CDP of Gulivoire Park, Indiana
- Census-designated place
- Location in the state of Indiana
- Coordinates: 41°36′52″N 86°14′58″W
- Country: United States
- State: Indiana
- County: St. Joseph
- Township: Centre

Area
  - Total: 1.4 sq mi (3.5 km^{2})
  - Land: 1.4 sq mi (3.5 km^{2})
  - Water: 0 sq mi (0.0 km^{2})
- Elevation: 830 ft (250 m)

Population (2000)
  - Total: 2,974
  - Density: 2,171/sq mi (838.2/km^{2})
- Time zone: UTC-5 (Eastern (EST))
  - Summer (DST): UTC-4 (EDT)
- ZIP code: 46614
- Area code: 574
- FIPS code: 18-30230
- GNIS feature ID: 2830522

Gulivoire Park is a census-designated place (CDP) in Centre Township, St. Joseph County, in the U.S. state of Indiana. The population was 2,974 at the 2000 census. It is part of the South Bend–Mishawaka, IN-MI, Metropolitan Statistical Area.

== Geography ==
According to the United States Census Bureau, the CDP has a total area of 1.4 square miles (3.6 km^{2}), all land.

== Demographics ==
Historical population
Census	Pop.	Note	%±
1990	2,788		—
2000	2,974		6.7%

As of the census of 2000, there were 2,974 people, 1,235 households, and 887 families residing in the CDP. The population density was 2,165.4 inhabitants per square mile (836.1/km^{2}). There were 1,275 housing units at an average density of 928.4 per square mile (358.5/km^{2}). The racial makeup of the CDP was 97.65% White, 0.64% African American, 0.67% Asian, 0.30% from other races, and 0.74% from two or more races. Hispanic or Latino of any race were 1.18% of the population.

There were 1,235 households, out of which 26.8% had children under the age of 18 living with them, 63.1% were married couples living together, 6.3% had a female householder with no husband present, and 28.1% were non-families. 24.8% of all households were made up of individuals, and 12.6% had someone living alone who was 65 years of age or older. The average household size was 2.41 and the average family size was 2.87.

In the CDP, the population was spread out, with 22.5% under the age of 18, 6.1% from 18 to 24, 24.8% from 25 to 44, 25.6% from 45 to 64, and 21.0% who were 65 years of age or older. The median age was 43 years. For every 100 females, there were 93.5 males. For every 100 females age 18 and over, there were 93.5 males.

The median income for a household in the CDP was $46,156, and the median income for a family was $51,908. Males had a median income of $39,521 versus $26,827 for females. The per capita income for the CDP was $20,432. About 2.6% of families and 3.9% of the population were below the poverty line, including 3.7% of those under age 18 and none of those age 65 or over.

== Subdivisions ==
Gulivoire Park is made up of multiple subdivisions including Hartman Place, Forest Park, Highland View, Gilmer Park, Swanson Heights, Southmoor, Farmington Estates, Orchard Heights, Miami Trails, Miami Meadows, Dixie Gardens, Jewelwood, Cuyahoga Hills, Jewel Park and Hidden Creek.

Located in the Highland View subdivision is St. Jude Catholic Church & School. This school is home to kindergarten to 8th grade students and their athletic sport teams are known as the St. Jude Falcons.

Located in the Southmoor subdivision is New Beginnings Community Fellowship Church of the Nazarene.

Located in the Forest Park subdivision is Forest G. Hay School. This public school is a primary center which consists of kindergarten to 4th grade students and their athletic sport teams are known as the Hay Hawks. Also located in the Forest Park subdivision is Forest Park Playground which has tennis courts, picnic tables, swing sets and a merry-go-round.
