= Deerfield, South Dakota =

Unincorporated community in South Dakota, U.S.

Coordinates: 44°01′02″N 103°50′03″W

Deerfield is an unincorporated community in Pennington County, in the U.S. state of South Dakota.

== History ==
A post office called Deerfield was established in 1892, and remained in operation until 1954. The community was so named on account of the area being a favorite hunting ground for deer.

== Climate ==
Climate data for Deerfield 3 SE, South Dakota, 1981–2010 normals, extremes 1948–2003: 6,060 ft (1,847 m)
Month	Jan	Feb	Mar	Apr	May	Jun	Jul	Aug	Sep	Oct	Nov	Dec	Year
Record high °F (°C)	58 (14)	62 (17)	68 (20)	78 (26)	84 (29)	98 (37)	97 (36)	95 (35)	90 (32)	82 (28)	72 (22)	63 (17)	98 (37)
Mean maximum °F (°C)	52.2 (11.2)	54.0 (12.2)	60.4 (15.8)	68.9 (20.5)	76.6 (24.8)	83.3 (28.5)	88.2 (31.2)	87.0 (30.6)	82.1 (27.8)	71.7 (22.1)	58.5 (14.7)	53.2 (11.8)	88.1 (31.2)
Mean daily maximum °F (°C)	32.8 (0.4)	34.2 (1.2)	41.3 (5.2)	48.7 (9.3)	58.8 (14.9)	68.5 (20.3)	76.8 (24.9)	75.5 (24.2)	65.8 (18.8)	52.8 (11.6)	40.8 (4.9)	32.3 (0.2)	52.4 (11.3)
Daily mean °F (°C)	19.1 (−7.2)	19.3 (−7.1)	27.4 (−2.6)	35.4 (1.9)	45.1 (7.3)	54.2 (12.3)	60.9 (16.1)	59.0 (15.0)	49.3 (9.6)	38.3 (3.5)	26.8 (−2.9)	18.7 (−7.4)	37.8 (3.2)
Mean daily minimum °F (°C)	5.4 (−14.8)	4.5 (−15.3)	13.6 (−10.2)	22.2 (−5.4)	31.5 (−0.3)	39.9 (4.4)	44.9 (7.2)	42.6 (5.9)	32.9 (0.5)	23.8 (−4.6)	12.9 (−10.6)	5.0 (−15.0)	23.3 (−4.8)
Mean minimum °F (°C)	−17.2 (−27.3)	−18.0 (−27.8)	−10.8 (−23.8)	1.6 (−16.9)	17.1 (−8.3)	27.7 (−2.4)	34.1 (1.2)	32.0 (0.0)	18.1 (−7.7)	5.2 (−14.9)	−7.1 (−21.7)	−18.2 (−27.9)	−28.7 (−33.7)
Record low °F (°C)	−40 (−40)	−42 (−41)	−34 (−37)	−22 (−30)	6 (−14)	14 (−10)	23 (−5)	20 (−7)	5 (−15)	−16 (−27)	−29 (−34)	−45 (−43)	−45 (−43)
Average precipitation inches (mm)	0.53 (13)	0.66 (17)	1.05 (27)	2.04 (52)	3.53 (90)	2.95 (75)	2.95 (75)	2.43 (62)	1.70 (43)	1.57 (40)	0.87 (22)	0.58 (15)	20.86 (531)
Average snowfall inches (cm)	9.8 (25)	12.1 (31)	13.9 (35)	20.3 (52)	2.6 (6.6)	0.0 (0.0)	0.0 (0.0)	0.0 (0.0)	1.4 (3.6)	10.9 (28)	12.3 (31)	11.7 (30)	95 (242.2)
Average precipitation days (≥ 0.01 in)	6.3	6.1	8.1	10.3	12.7	13.3	12.9	10.3	7.2	7.3	6.8	5.7	107
Average snowy days (≥ 0.1 in)	5.2	5.1	6.1	5.5	1.0	0.2	0.0	0.0	0.7	2.9	4.6	5.4	36.7
Source 1: NOAA
Source 2: XMACIS2

Blind Park is a SNOTEL weather station 7.8 miles (12.6 km) northwest of Deerfield, at an altitude of 6890 ft (2100 m).

Climate data for Blind Park, South Dakota, 1991–2020 normals, extremes 1990–present: 6890ft (2100m)
Month	Jan	Feb	Mar	Apr	May	Jun	Jul	Aug	Sep	Oct	Nov	Dec	Year
Record high °F (°C)	62 (17)	61 (16)	66 (19)	73 (23)	85 (29)	88 (31)	91 (33)	92 (33)	88 (31)	79 (26)	65 (18)	58 (14)	92 (33)
Mean maximum °F (°C)	50.8 (10.4)	51.4 (10.8)	59.5 (15.3)	66.0 (18.9)	74.7 (23.7)	81.3 (27.4)	86.0 (30.0)	84.8 (29.3)	80.2 (26.8)	70.2 (21.2)	57.5 (14.2)	48.7 (9.3)	87.1 (30.6)
Mean daily maximum °F (°C)	31.4 (−0.3)	33.6 (0.9)	42.1 (5.6)	47.3 (8.5)	55.8 (13.2)	66.3 (19.1)	74.5 (23.6)	73.4 (23.0)	64.0 (17.8)	49.5 (9.7)	38.5 (3.6)	30.9 (−0.6)	50.6 (10.3)
Daily mean °F (°C)	20.9 (−6.2)	21.6 (−5.8)	29.7 (−1.3)	35.6 (2.0)	44.3 (6.8)	53.9 (12.2)	60.9 (16.1)	59.6 (15.3)	51.0 (10.6)	38.2 (3.4)	28.1 (−2.2)	20.7 (−6.3)	38.7 (3.7)
Mean daily minimum °F (°C)	10.3 (−12.1)	9.6 (−12.4)	17.4 (−8.1)	23.8 (−4.6)	32.6 (0.3)	41.3 (5.2)	47.4 (8.6)	45.8 (7.7)	38.1 (3.4)	27.2 (−2.7)	17.7 (−7.9)	10.4 (−12.0)	26.8 (−2.9)
Mean minimum °F (°C)	−13.5 (−25.3)	−13.7 (−25.4)	−2.6 (−19.2)	7.3 (−13.7)	19.6 (−6.9)	30.7 (−0.7)	38.4 (3.6)	35.1 (1.7)	25.2 (−3.8)	8.6 (−13.0)	−2.7 (−19.3)	−11.2 (−24.0)	−22.5 (−30.3)
Record low °F (°C)	−37 (−38)	−35 (−37)	−21 (−29)	−11 (−24)	9 (−13)	21 (−6)	30 (−1)	25 (−4)	8 (−13)	−12 (−24)	−17 (−27)	−33 (−36)	−37 (−38)
Average precipitation inches (mm)	1.77 (45)	1.73 (44)	1.79 (45)	2.89 (73)	4.08 (104)	3.10 (79)	2.57 (65)	1.72 (44)	1.58 (40)	2.45 (62)	1.80 (46)	1.49 (38)	26.97 (685)
Source 1: XMACIS2
Source 2: NOAA (Precipitation)
