= Gates Corner, Beltrami County, Minnesota =

Gates Corner
- Unincorporated community
- Location within Minnesota Location within the United States
- Coordinates: 48°27′10″N 95°19′09″W
- Country: United States
- State: Minnesota
- County: Beltrami
- Elevation: 1,247 ft (380 m)
- Time zone: UTC-6 (Central (CST))
  - Summer (DST): UTC-5 (CDT)
- Area code: 218
- GNIS feature ID: 654720

Gates Corner is an unincorporated community in Beltrami County, Minnesota, United States.
