= Bella Vista, Virginia =

Unincorporated community in Virginia, US

Coordinates: 37°06′24″N 80°47′12″W

Bella Vista is an unincorporated community in Pulaski County, in the U.S. state of Virginia.
