= Abarr, Colorado =

Unincorporated community in Yuma County, Colorado, United States

- unincorporated community
- Location of Abarr, Colorado. Abarr (Colorado)
- Coordinates: 39°51′02″N 102°42′26″W
- Country: United States
- State: Colorado
- County: Yuma

Government
  - Type: unincorporated community
  - Body: Yuma County
- Elevation: 4,242 ft (1,293 m)
- Time zone: UTC−7 (MST)
  - Summer (DST): UTC−6 (MDT)
- Area code: 970
- GNIS pop ID: 204724

Abarr is an unincorporated community in Yuma County, Colorado, United States.

== History ==
Abarr was originally called Brownsville, and under the latter name was platted in 1922. The present name "Abarr" was adopted in 1923. The Abarr post office operated from February 26, 1923, until November 30, 1947. Abarr was named after the maiden name of Ethel Hoffman, the wife of Silas Hoffman, a couple who owned a postal office there.

== Geography ==
Abarr is located in western Yuma County, Colorado.

== See also ==
- List of populated places in Colorado
- List of post offices in Colorado
