= Wertz–Bestle Farm =

- U.S. National Register of Historic Places
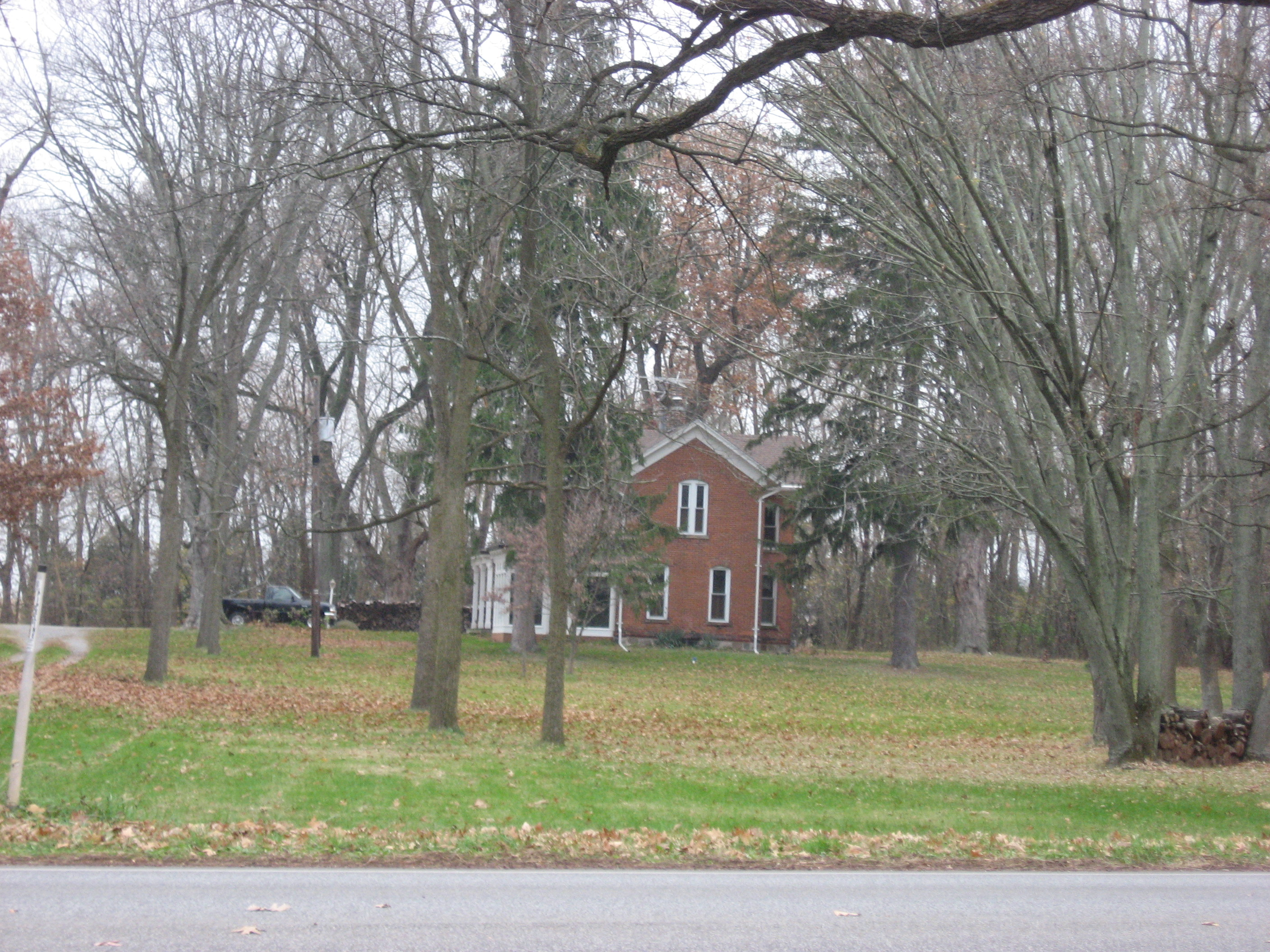
- The Wertz–Bestle farmhouse, November 2013

- Location within Indiana Location within the United States
- Location: 51387 Portage Rd., north of South Bend in German Township, St. Joseph County, Indiana
- Coordinates: 41°44′46″N 86°18′00″W
- Area: 12.7 acres (5.1 ha)
- Built: 1872
- Architectural style: Italianate, Schweitzer barn
- NRHP reference No.: 01000356
- Added to NRHP: April 12, 2001

Wertz–Bestle Farm is a historic home and farm located in German Township, St. Joseph County, Indiana. The house was built about 1872, and is a two-story, "T"-plan, Italianate style brick dwelling with a 1 1/2-story kitchen wing. It sits on a fieldstone foundation and has bracketed eaves and segmental arched windows. Also on the property is the contributing 3 1/2-story, two-level, Schweitzer barn.

It was listed on the National Register of Historic Places in 2001.
