= List of Art Deco architecture in Indiana =

The following buildings are examples of the Art Deco architectural style in Indiana, United States.

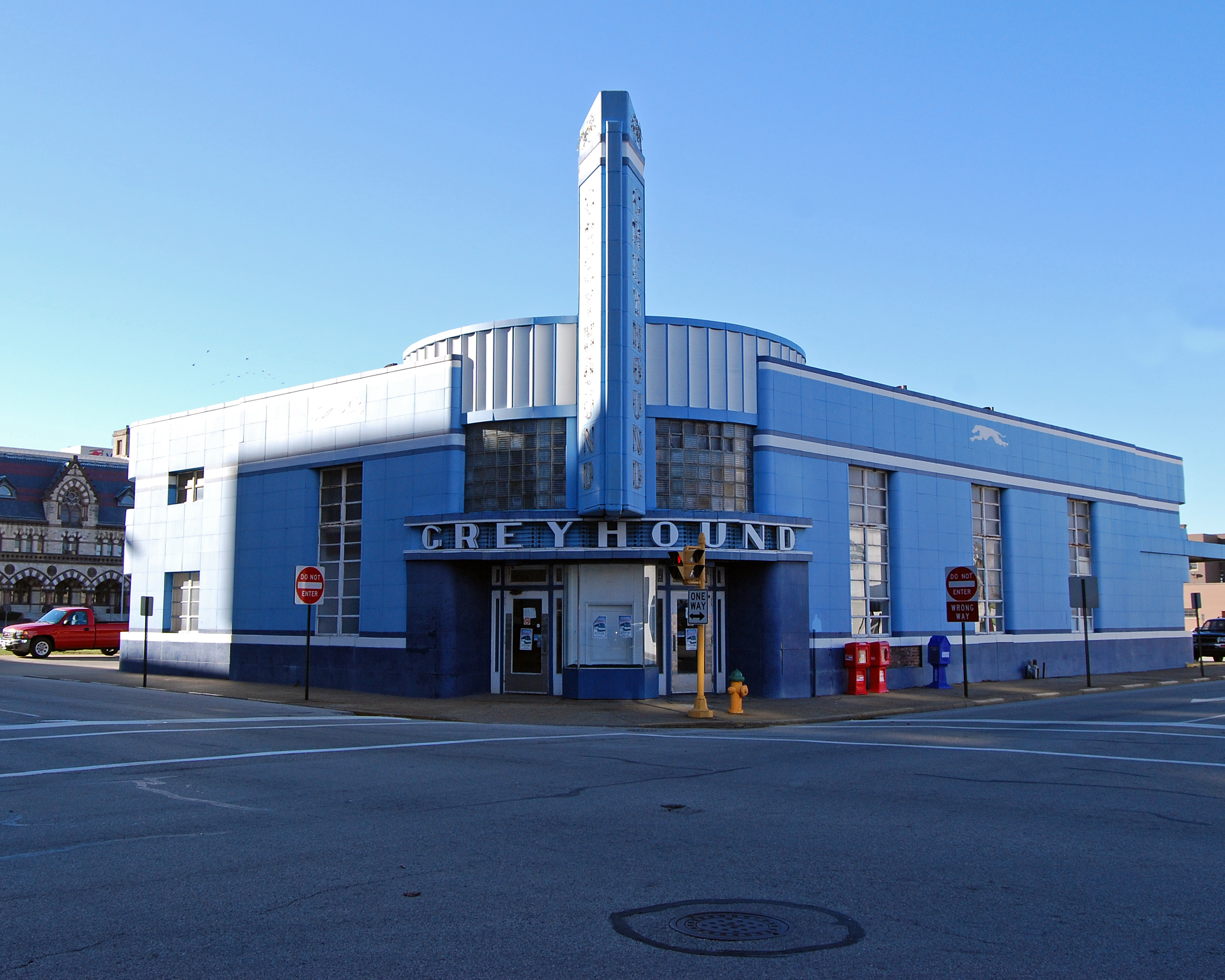
Greyhound Bus Terminal, Evansville

== Evansville ==
- 325 Main Street (former J. H. Schultz Shoes), Evansville, 1909 and 1940s
- Bosse Field, Evansville, 1915
- Cambridge Arms Apartments, Evansville, 1920
- Children's Museum of Evansville, Evansville, 1931
- Evansville Civic Theatre (former Columbia Theatre), Evansville, 1910 and 1939
- Firestone Tire and Rubber Store, Evansville, 1930
- Greyhound Bus Terminal, Evansville, 1938
- Hulman Building, Evansville, 1928
- Indiana Bell Building, Evansville, 1929
- Lincoln School, Evansville, 1928
- Lynch School (now law offices), Evansville, 1930
- Old Fellwock Auto Company, Evansville, 1922
- Vectren Power Substation (former SIGECO substation), Evansville, 1935
- Zuki Restaurant (former a bank), Evansville, 1940

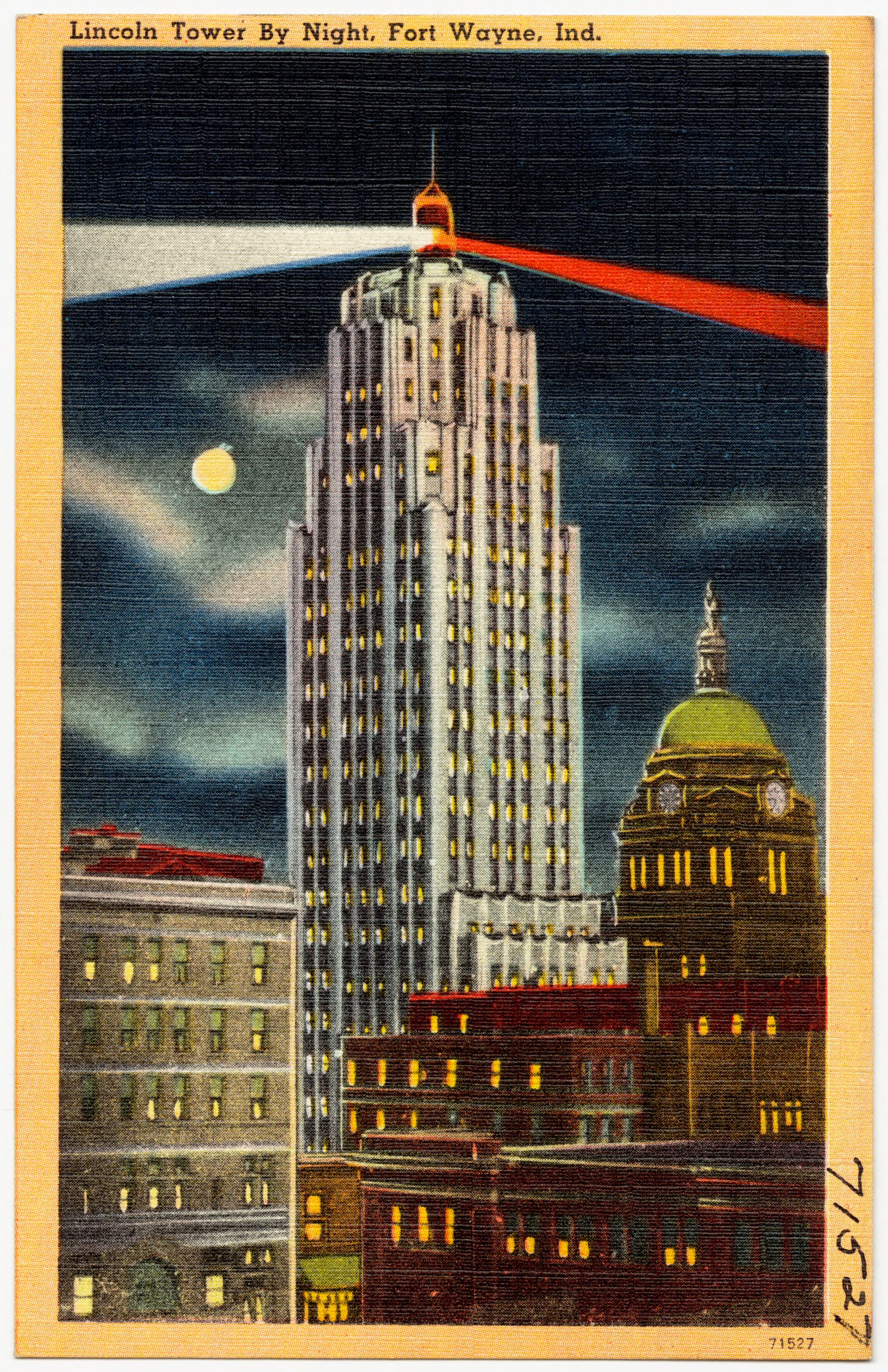
Lincoln Bank Tower, Fort Wayne

== Fort Wayne ==
- 3414 Fairfield, Fort Wayne, 1940
- AT&T Building (former Indiana Bell Telephone Company Exchange Building), Fort Wayne, 1932
- E. Ross Adair Federal Building and United States Courthouse, Fort Wayne, 1932
- Goodrich Silvertown Tire and Service Station, Fort Wayne, 1930
- Harry L. Soshea House, 930 Prange, Fort Wayne, 1936
- Indiana State Highway Garage, Fort Wayne, 1938, 1968
- Lewis Bakeries (former Holsum Bakery Company), Fort Wayne, 1928 and 1948
- Lincoln Bank Tower, Fort Wayne, Indiana, 1930
- MacDougal Memorial Chapel, Fort Wayne
- North Manufacturing Building, 730 Growth, Fort Wayne, 1923
- REA Magnet Wire Company (former INCA Company Building), Fort Wayne, 1928
- Strebig Construction Building, Fort Wayne, 1958
- Trinity Hall, University of Saint Francis, Fort Wayne, 1948
- Zollner Piston Company, Fort Wayne, 1931

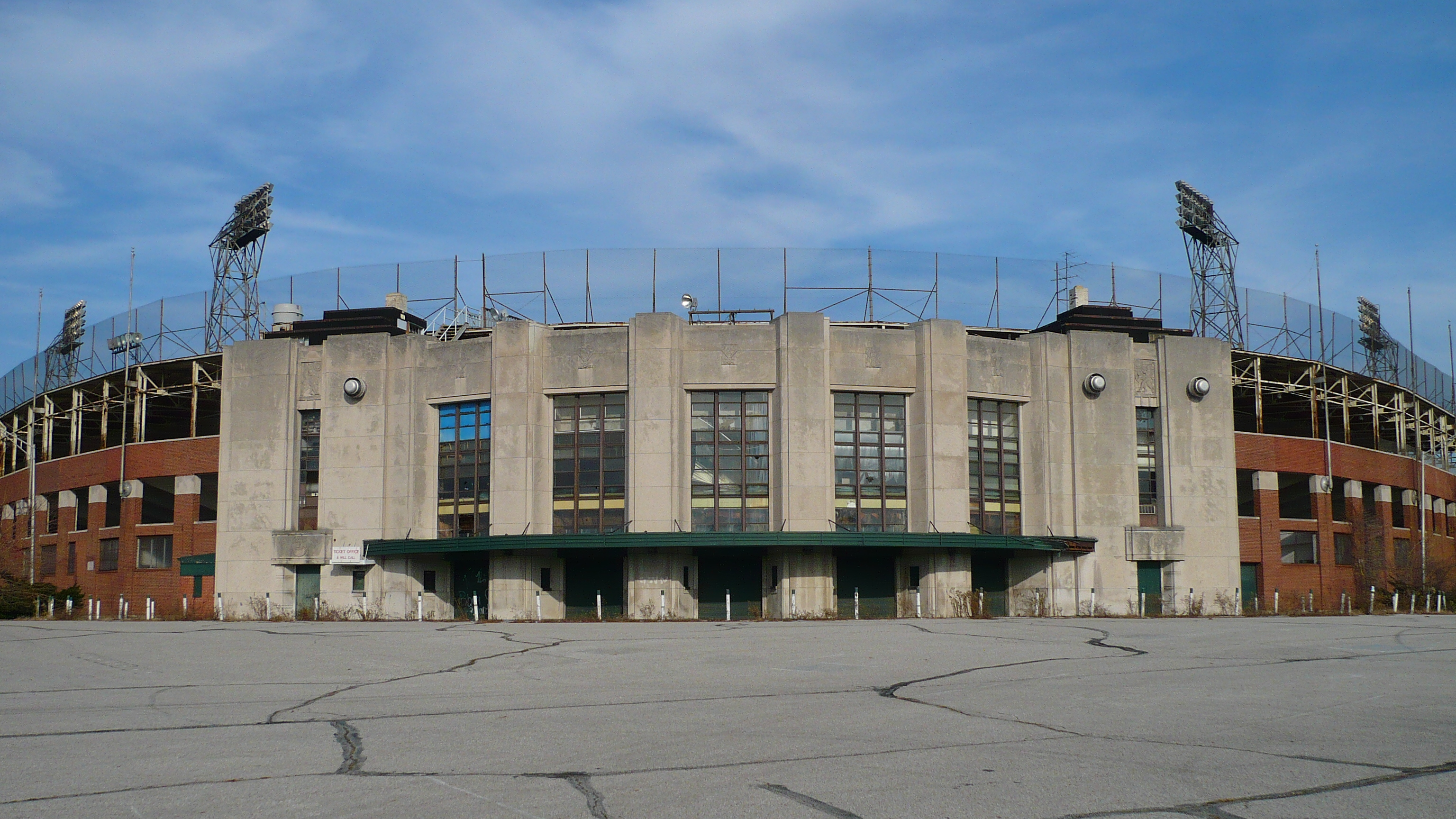
Bush Stadium, Indianapolis

== Indianapolis ==
- 333 Penn (former Architects and Builders Building), Indianapolis, 1912 and 1929
- 3762 North Meridian Street, Shortridge–Meridian Street Apartments Historic District, Indianapolis, 1948
- The Admiral, Indianapolis, 1929
- The Alameda, Indianapolis, 1925
- Bauer Apartments, Shortridge–Meridian Street Apartments Historic District, Indianapolis, 1937
- Bush Stadium, Indianapolis, 1931
- Circle Tower, Indianapolis, 1930
- Clinical Building, Indiana University, Indianapolis, 1936
- Coca-Cola Bottling Company of Indianapolis (now Bottleworks Hotel), Indianapolis, 1920, 1949
- Cole Motor Car Company Building, Indianapolis, 1913
- The Garage Food Hall, Indianapolis, 1949
- H. P. Wasson and Company, Indianapolis, 1937
- Indiana Oxygen Company building, Indianapolis, 1930
- Indiana State Library and Historical Bureau, Indianapolis, 1934
- Indiana World War Memorial Plaza, Indianapolis, 1924
- Kassebaum Building, Indianapolis, 1928
- Madam Walker Legacy Center, Indianapolis, 1927
- The McKay, Indianapolis, 1924
- Old Trails Automobile Insurance Association, Indianapolis, 1928
- Sears, Roebuck & Co. Building, Indianapolis, 1929
- Shortridge Apartments, Shortridge–Meridian Street Apartments Historic District, Indianapolis, 1938
- Willow Marketing Building, Shortridge–Meridian Street Apartments Historic District, Indianapolis, 1958

== New Haven ==
- 621 Broadway Street, New Haven, 1925
- Navy Club (former Arrington Theatre, Broadway Theatre), New Haven, 1930 and 1945
- New Haven Adams Township Fire Department Station 1, New Haven

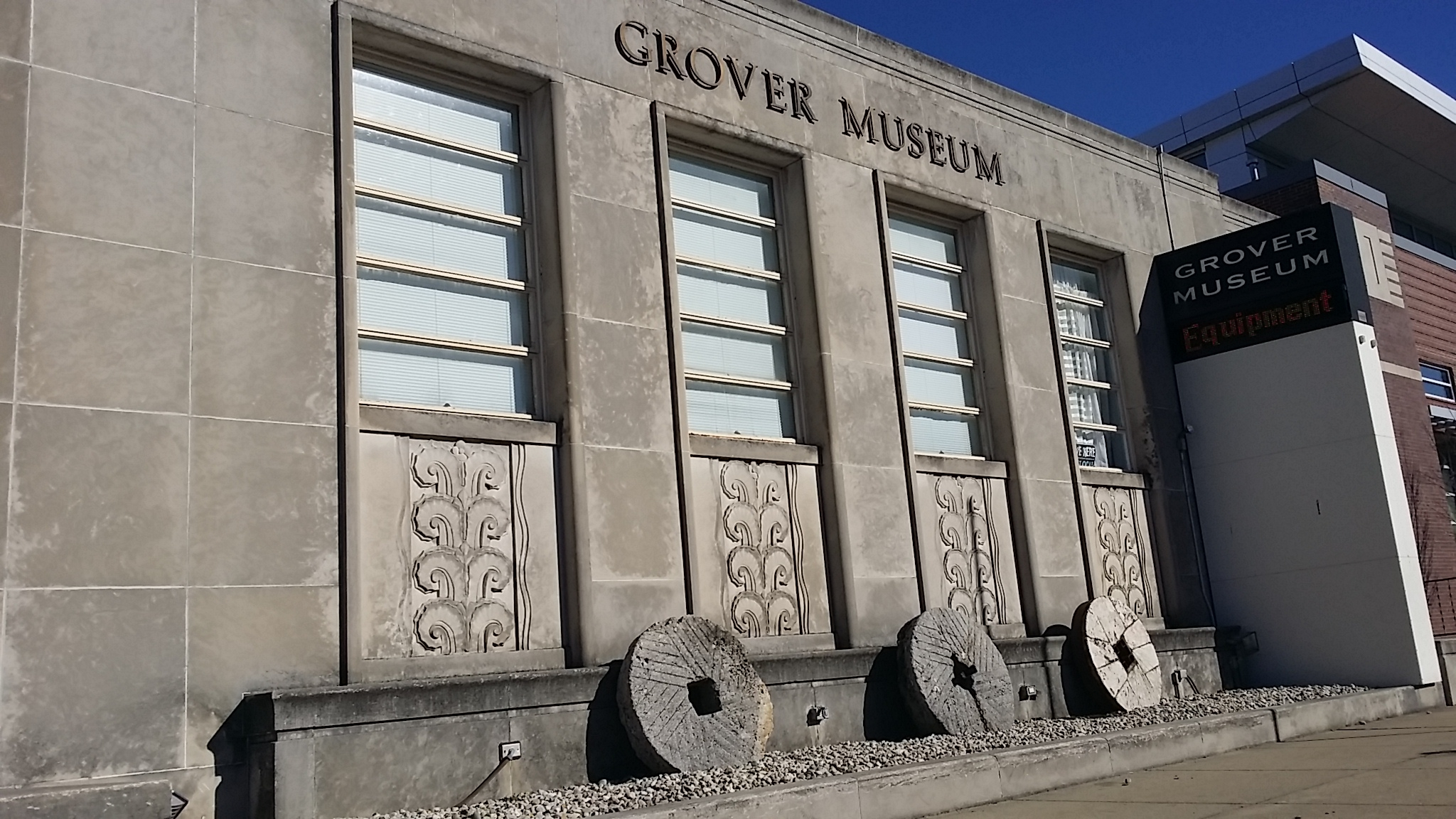
Grover Center Museum and Historical Society, Shelbyville

== Shelbyville ==
- Coca-Cola Bottling Company, Shelbyville, 1930
- First United Methodist Church, Shelbyville, 1920
- Grover Center Museum and Historical Society (former Elk's Lodge), Shelbyville, 1940
- Lora B. Pearson School, Shelbyville, 1939
- Porter Pool Bathhouse, Shelbyville, 1930
- Shelby County Courthouse, Shelbyville, 1937
- Shelby Tire & Auto Care, Shelbyville

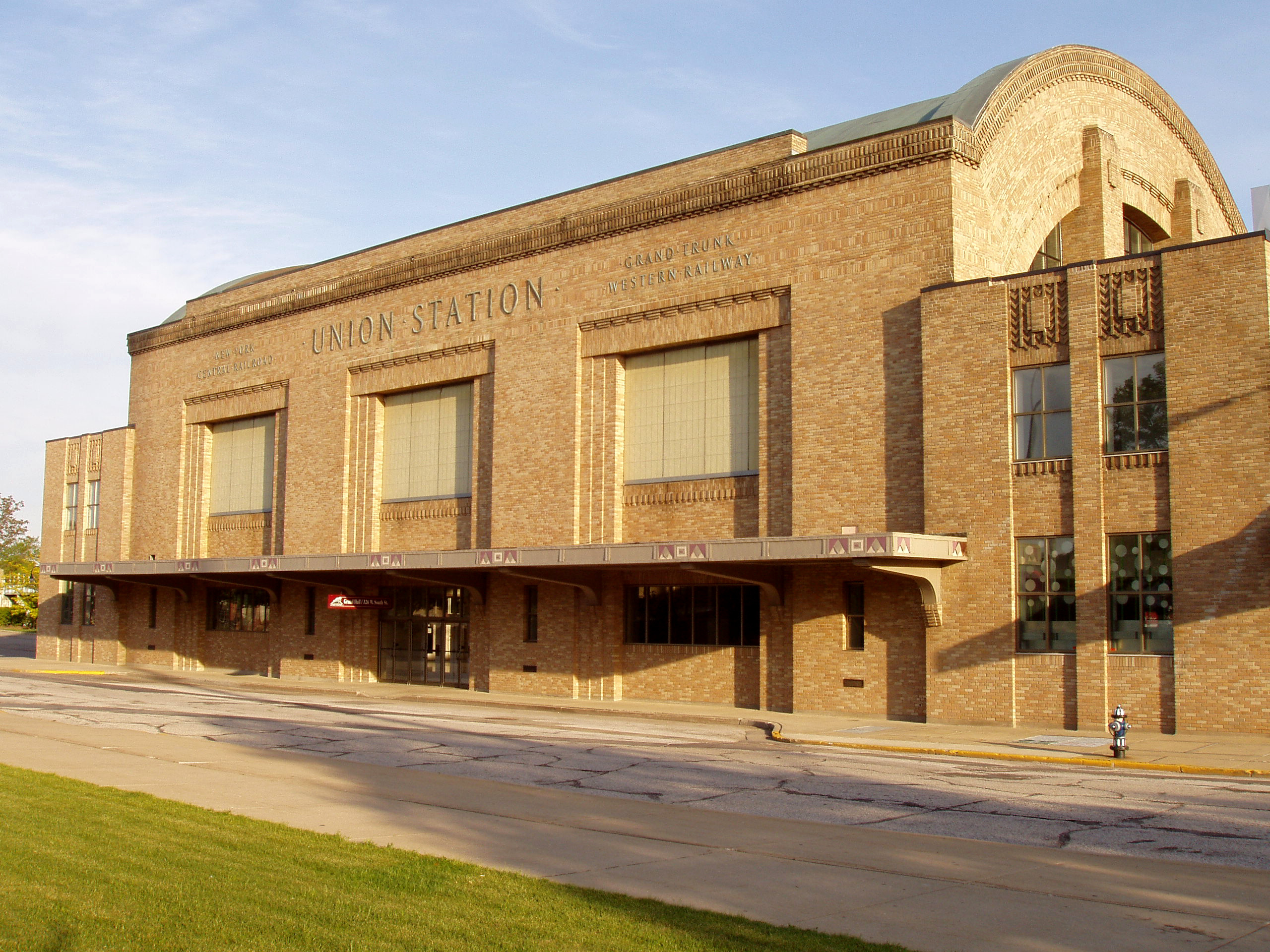
Union Station, South Bend

== South Bend ==
- 1000 Sample Street (former Wilson Brothers), South Bend, 1920
- 1008 Lincolnway East, South Bend, 1925
- 1011 Main Street, South Bend, 1924
- 1237 Western Avenue, South Bend, 1914
- 303 Chapin Street, South Bend, 1922
- 407 Lincolnway West Apartments, South Bend, 1930
- Farmers Security Building, 133 South Main Street, South Bend, 1915
- Fire Station No. 4, South Bend, 1920
- Hoffman Hotel Apartments, South Bend, 1930
- I & M Building, South Bend, 1929
- Indiana Fencing Academy/Escrime du Lac Fencing Club, South Bend, 1950
- Jefferson Place, South Bend, 1920
- John Adams High School, South Bend, 1940
- Kaniewski Building, 1201 Western Avenue, South Bend, 1914
- Marquette School, South Bend, 1937
- NIPSCO Gas Building, South Bend, 1940
- PTL Tire Company, South Bend, 1930
- Robert A. Grant Federal Building and U.S. Courthouse, South Bend, 1933
- Rozplochowski Furniture, 1237 Western Avenue, South Bend, 1914
- South Bend Chocolate Company (former John Baungarth Company), South Bend, 1929
- South Bend Tribune Building, South Bend, 1922
- State Theatre, South Bend, 1934
- That Church Downtown (former Salvation Army), South Bend, 1946
- Twin City Building, South Bend, 1928
- Union Station, South Bend, 1929
- W. R. Hinkle and Company, South Bend, 1922

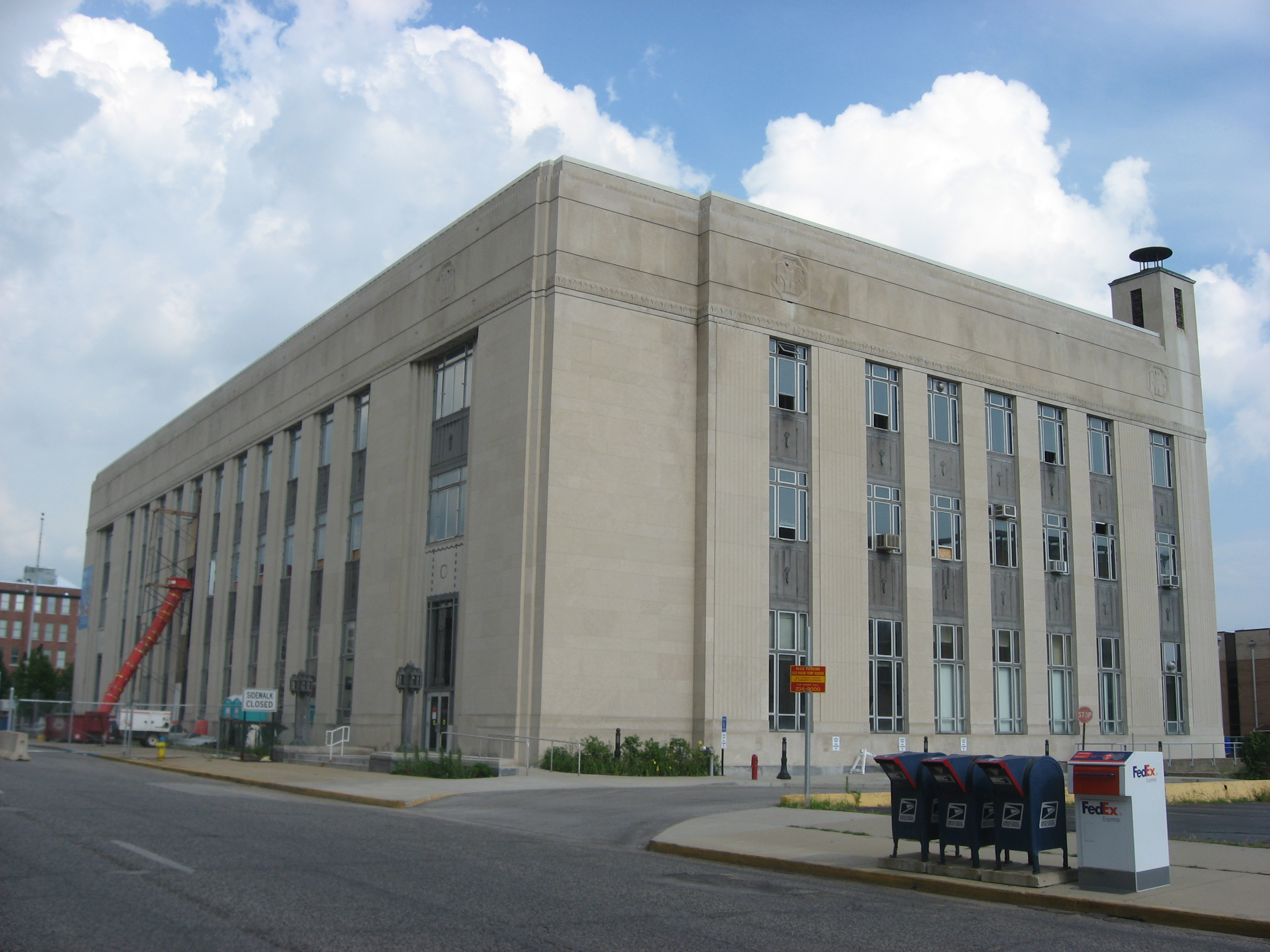
Terre Haute Post Office and Federal Building, Terre Haute

== Terre Haute ==
- 1246 Maple Avenue, Twelve Points Historic District, Terre Haute, c. 1925
- AT&T Building (former Indiana Bell Building), Wabash Avenue–East Historic District, Terre Haute, 1940
- Citizens' Trust Company Building, Terre Haute, 1922
- Columbian Enameling and Stamping Company, Terre Haute, 1940
- Indiana Landmarks Western Regional Office (former Terre Haute Mutual Savings Association), Terre Haute, 1941
- McCalister Brothers Construction (former Merchants Freight company), Terre Haute, 1945
- National Building, Terre Haute, 1934
- RiverFront Lofts (former American Can Company, Pillsbury), Terre Haute, 1930
- Stalker Hall (now College of Arts and Sciences, Indiana State University), Terre Haute, 1954
- Swope Art Museum, Terre Haute, 1942
- Terre Haute Post Office and Federal Building, Terre Haute, 1933

== Versailles ==
- Gibson Theatre, Versailles, 1921 and 1929
- Tyson United Methodist Church, Versailles, 1937
- Versailles School and Tyson Auditorium, Versailles, 1938

== Other sites ==
- 210 East Washington Street, Hartford City Courthouse Square Historic District, Hartford City, 1940
- American Steam Laundry Building, Washington Commercial Historic District, Washington, 1930
- Anderson Bank Building, Anderson, 1928
- Armco-Ferro House, Century of Progress Architectural District, Beverly Shores, 1933
- Artcraft Theatre, Franklin, 1922
- Astra Theatre, Jasper, 1936
- Auburn Cord Duesenberg Automobile Museum, Auburn, 1930
- Buskirk-Chumley Theatre, Bloomington, 1934
- Central Fire Station, Columbus, 1941
- Coca-Cola Bottling Plant, Bloomington, 1924
- Colgate Factory, Jeffersonville, 1921
- Cooper Theater, Brazil Downtown Historic District, Brazil, 1947
- The Crump Theatre, Columbus, 1889 and 1941
- Decatur Township Junior High School, Decatur, 1938
- Devon Theater, Attica Downtown Historic District, Attica, 1938
- Eger Grocery Building, Rensselaer Courthouse Square Historic District, Rensselaer, 1930
- Forest Hill Cemetery Abbey, Greencastle, 1931
- Fountain County Courthouse, Covington, 1937
- Fowler Theatre, Fowler, 1940
- Haggar Hall, Saint Mary's College, Notre Dame, 1936
- Honeywell Center, Wabash, 1941–1952
- Howard County Courthouse, Kokomo Courthouse Square Historic District, Kokomo, 1937
- L. Fish Furniture Building, State Street Commercial Historic District, Hammond, 1927
- Peabody Memorial Tower, North Manchester, 1937
- Peru High School, Peru High School Historic District, Peru, 1939
- Pickwick Theatre, Syracuse, 1947
- Riley Hall, University of Notre Dame, Notre Dame, 1920
- Salvation Army, Bedford, 1930s
- Scheidler Theatre, Hartford City Courthouse Square Historic District, Hartford City, 1947
- Sowers & Gough Drugstore, Hartford City Courthouse Square Historic District, Hartford City, 1910 and 1940
- Temple Theatre, Mishawaka, 1916
- Times Theatre (former Char-Belle Theatre), Rochester, 1924
- Tower Hotel, Anderson, 1930
- Wigwam Mineola Tribe No. 86 Building, Franklin, 1920s

== See also ==
- List of Art Deco architecture
- List of Art Deco architecture in the United States
