= East Washington Street Historic District =

East Washington Street Historic District may refer to:

- East Washington Street Historic District (Martinsville, Indiana), listed on the National Register of Historic Places in Morgan County, Indiana
- East Washington Street Historic District (South Bend, Indiana), listed on the National Register of Historic Places in St. Joseph County, Indiana
