= Austin & Shambleau =

American architectural practice

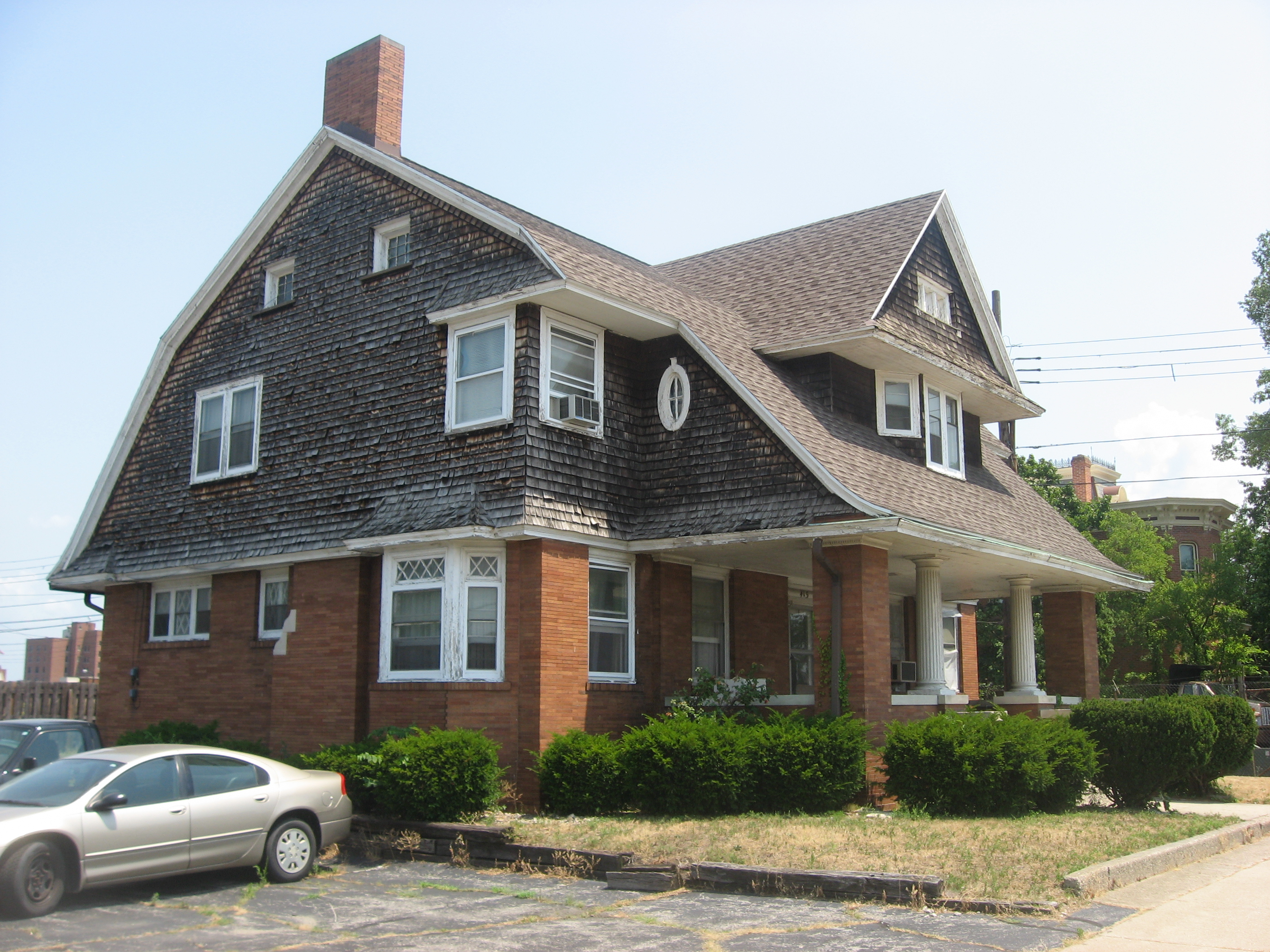
- Hager House, South Bend, 1909.

Practice information
- Key architects: Ennis Raymond Austin; Norman Roy Shambleau
- Founded: 1909
- Dissolved: 1942
- Location: South Bend, Indiana, US

Austin & Shambleau was an American architectural partnership in South Bend, Indiana, in the United States. It was founded by Ennis R. Austin and N. Roy Shambleau and operated from 1909 to 1942. It has been described as "the most distinguished architectural firm in Northern Indiana" of the early twentieth century.

== Partner biographies ==
Ennis Raymond Austin was born August 30, 1863, in Owasco, New York, to John R. Austin. He attended public schools before entering Cornell University, graduating in 1886. For a year after his graduation he worked for Napoleon LeBrun & Sons, and then moved to the Tiffany Glass and Decorating Company, working under the supervision of John du Fais for four years. In 1892 he and a Tiffany colleague, Wilson B. Parker, moved west to South Bend to establish an architectural firm, Parker & Austin. In 1896 Austin became a member of the American Institute of Architects. Austin's partnership was dissolved in 1900 when he received an appointment as a construction superintendent in the Office of the Supervising Architect for the United States Treasury. In 1906 he returned to South Bend and formed the firm of Schneider & Austin with Walter W. Schneider. This partnership was dissolved in 1909, when he formed Austin & Shambleau with N. Roy Shambleau. This continued until its dissolution in 1942. He maintained a small private practice until his retirement in 1949. He died January 15, 1951.

Norman Roy Shambleau was born in 1888 in London, Ontario, to the carriage-maker P. E. Shambleau. At the age of eleven the family moved to Detroit, and at the age of seventeen Shambleau came to South Bend, entering the office of Wilson B. Parker. He worked for Parker and other South Bend architects until 1909, when he formed the partnership with Austin. After the firm was dissolved in 1942, Shambleau succeeded to the practice. He practiced independently at least through the late 1950s. He died in 1975.

== Legacy ==
A number of the firm's works are listed on the United States National Register of Historic Places, and others contribute to listed historic districts.

== Architectural works ==
Year	Building	Address	City	State	Notes	Image	Reference
1909	House for George L. Hager	415 W Wayne St	South Bend	Indiana	Listed on the National Register of Historic Places in 1985.		
1910	House for John M. Studebaker	904 E Jefferson Blvd	South Bend	Indiana	Listed on the National Register of Historic Places in 1999 as part of the Howard Park Historic District.		
1910	Indiana and Michigan Electric Company Power Station	401 E Colfax Ave	South Bend	Indiana	Listed on the National Register of Historic Places in 1999.		
1912	House for Dr. Merritt J. Keightley	1021 E Wayne St	South Bend	Indiana	Listed on the National Register of Historic Places in 1999 as part of the Howard Park Historic District.		
1916	House for Joseph de Lorenzi	812 E Jefferson Blvd	South Bend	Indiana	Listed on the National Register of Historic Places in 1999 as part of the Howard Park Historic District.		
1917	Mishawaka Trust and Savings Company Building	N Main St and Lincolnway W	Mishawaka	Indiana	Demolished.		
1919	Newman Building	127 E Main St	Niles	Michigan	Listed on the National Register of Historic Places in 2007 as part of the Niles Downtown Historic District.		
1919	South Bend Tribune Building	225 W Colfax Ave	South Bend	Indiana			
1919	"Twyckenham Park" for Albert Russel Erskine	1204 Honan Dr	South Bend	Indiana	Also known as Erskine Manor.		
1921	House for William C. Sibley	231 S Eddy St	South Bend	Indiana	Listed on the National Register of Historic Places in 1999 as part of the Howard Park Historic District.		
1922	House for Charles A. Lippincott	103 S Eddy St	South Bend	Indiana	Listed on the National Register of Historic Places in 1999 as part of the East Washington Street Historic District.		
1922	Knights of Pythias Lodge	224 W Jefferson Blvd	South Bend	Indiana	Designed in association with Austin's former partner, Walter W. Schneider. Listed on the National Register of Historic Places in 1985.		
1923	James Whitcomb Riley High School (former)	Fellows and Ewing Sts	South Bend	Indiana	Demolished.		
1927	Jefferson School	528 S Eddy St	South Bend	Indiana			
1928	Madison School	832 N Lafayette Blvd	South Bend	Indiana			
1929	House for Frederick G. Eberhart	536 Miami Club Ct	Mishawaka	Indiana			
1929	Indiana and Michigan Electric Company Building	220 W Colfax Ave	South Bend	Indiana	Listed on the National Register of Historic Places in 1985.		
1929	Tower Building	216 W Washington St	South Bend	Indiana	Listed on the National Register of Historic Places in 1985.		
1930	House for James A. Judie	1515 E Jefferson Blvd	South Bend	Indiana	Listed on the National Register of Historic Places in 1983.		
1932	United States Post Office and Courthouse	204 S Main St	South Bend	Indiana	Listed on the National Register of Historic Places in 2015.		
1936	Marquette School	1905 College St	South Bend	Indiana	Listed on the National Register of Historic Places in 2013.		
