= Neely House =

Neely House may refer to:

- Neely House (Martinsville, Indiana)
- Thompson-Neely House, Solebury Township, Pennsylvania
- Mallory–Neely House, Memphis, Tennessee
- John Neely House, Thompsons Station, Tennessee
