= Hager House (South Bend, Indiana) =

Historic house in Indiana, United States

- U.S. National Register of Historic Places
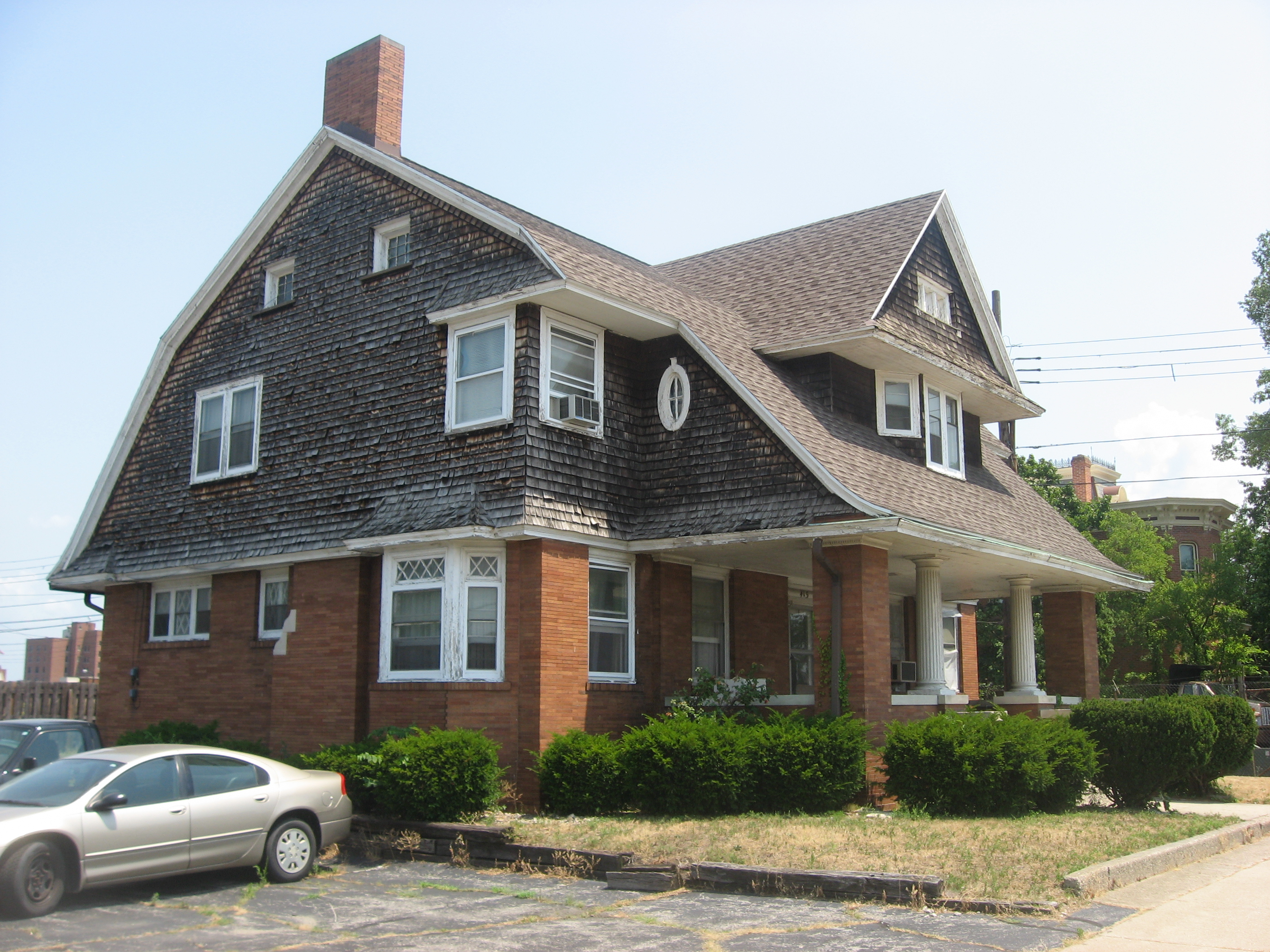
- Front and side of the house

- Location within Indiana Location within the United States
- Location: 415 W. Wayne, South Bend, Indiana
- Coordinates: 41°40′26″N 86°15′20″W
- Area: Less than 1 acre (0.40 ha)
- Built: 1910
- Architect: Austin & Shambleau
- Architectural style: Bungalow, American Craftsman, Shingle style
- MPS: Downtown South Bend Historic MRA
- NRHP reference No.: 85001212
- Added to NRHP: June 5, 1985

The Hager House is a historic home located at South Bend, Indiana. It was designed by architects Austin & Shambleau and built in 1910, and is a 2 1/2-story, Shingle Style dwelling. It has a gambrel roof with front eaves and a large gable roof dormer. It features a front porch with a bellcast roof supported by brick end piers and fluted Doric order columns.

It was listed on the National Register of Historic Places in 1985.
