= Howard Park Historic District =

Historic district in Indiana, United States

- U.S. National Register of Historic Places
- U.S. Historic district
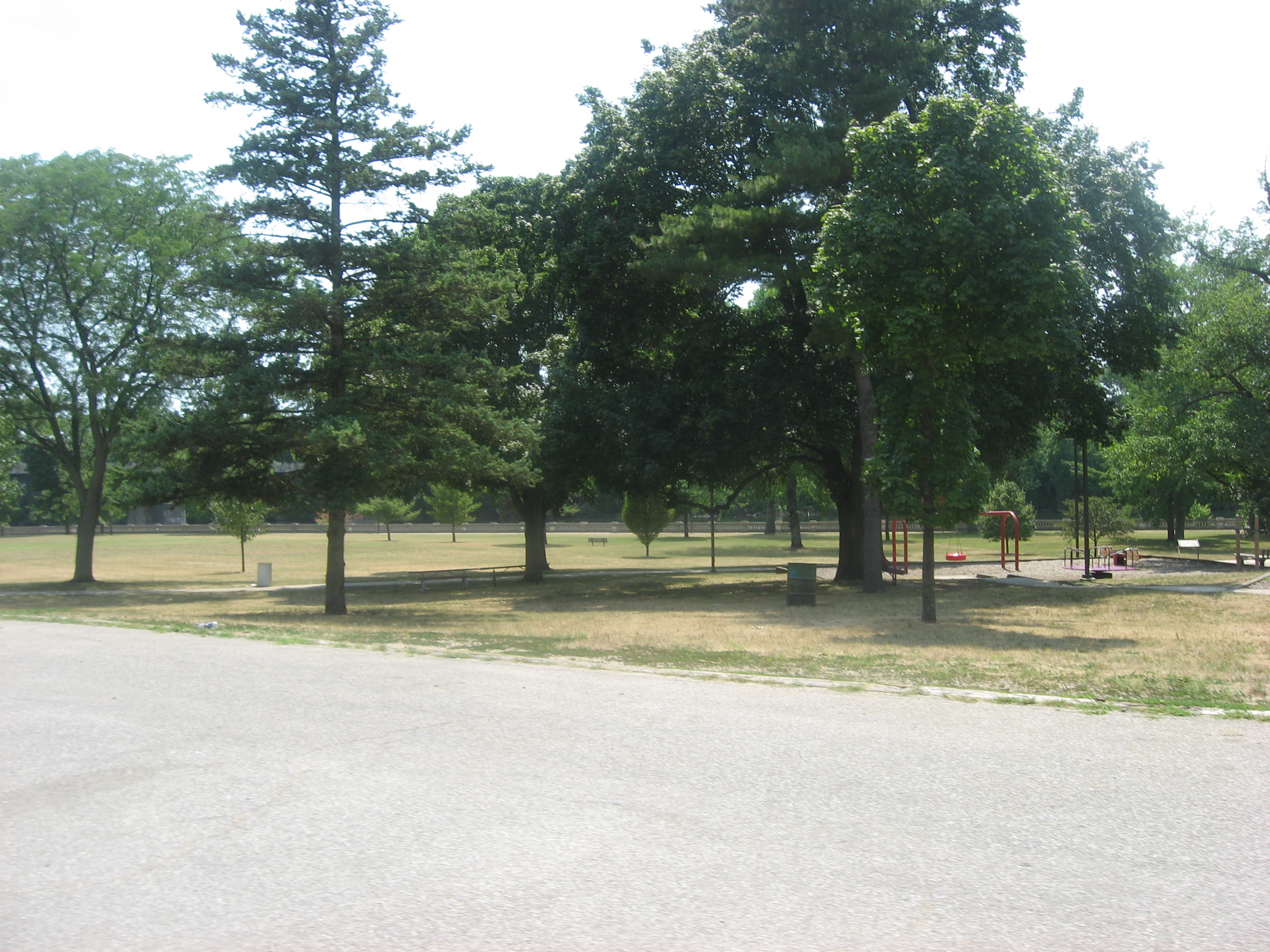
- Fields and a playground at the park

- Location within Indiana Location within the United States
- Location: Roughly between E. Jefferson and Wayne Sts., N. Eddy and the St. Joseph R., South Bend, Indiana
- Coordinates: 41°40′25″N 86°14′32″W
- Area: 27.6 acres (11.2 ha)
- Architect: Shambleau, N. Roy; Austin and Shambleau, et al.
- Architectural style: Queen Anne, Colonial Revival, Renaissance Revival
- MPS: East Bank MPS
- NRHP reference No.: 99000169
- Added to NRHP: February 18, 1999

The Howard Park Historic District is a national historic district located at South Bend, Indiana. It encompasses 27.6-acres and includes 51 contributing buildings, two additional contributing structures, and one further contributing site (Howard Park, named after state supreme justice Timothy Edward Howard). It developed between about 1880 and 1947, and includes notable examples of Queen Anne, Colonial Revival, Renaissance Revival, Prairie School, and Bungalow / American Craftsman style architecture and works by architects Austin & Shambleau. Notable buildings include the Sunnyside Apartments (1922), Studebaker / Johnson House (1907), Zion Evangelical Church (1888, 1930), the Works Progress Administration built Howard Park Administrative Building (1940), and Lister / Plotkin House (1882).

It was listed on the National Register of Historic Places in 1999.
