= Mass Ave Cultural Arts District =

Historic and cultural district in Indianapolis, Indiana, US

- Indianapolis Cultural District
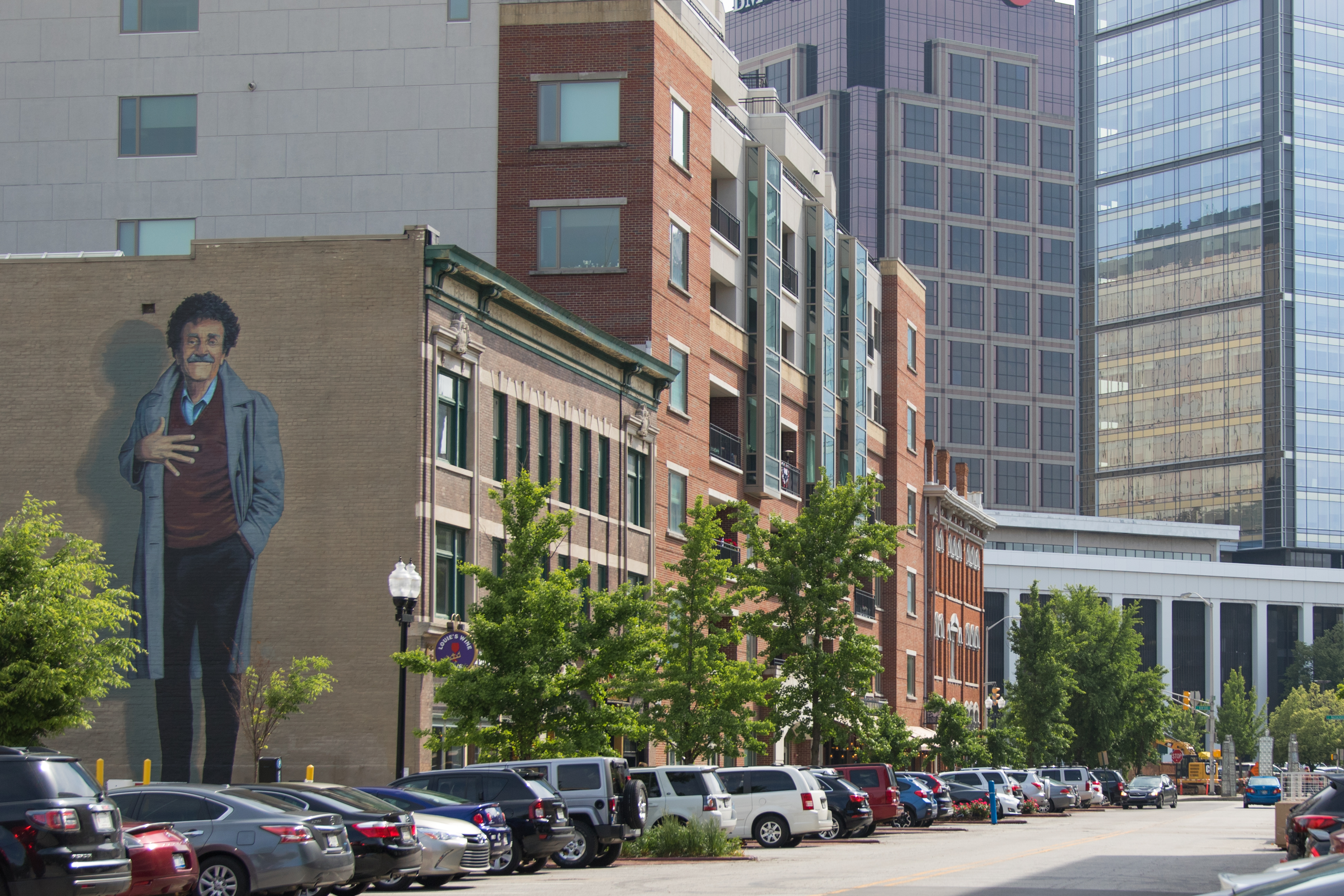
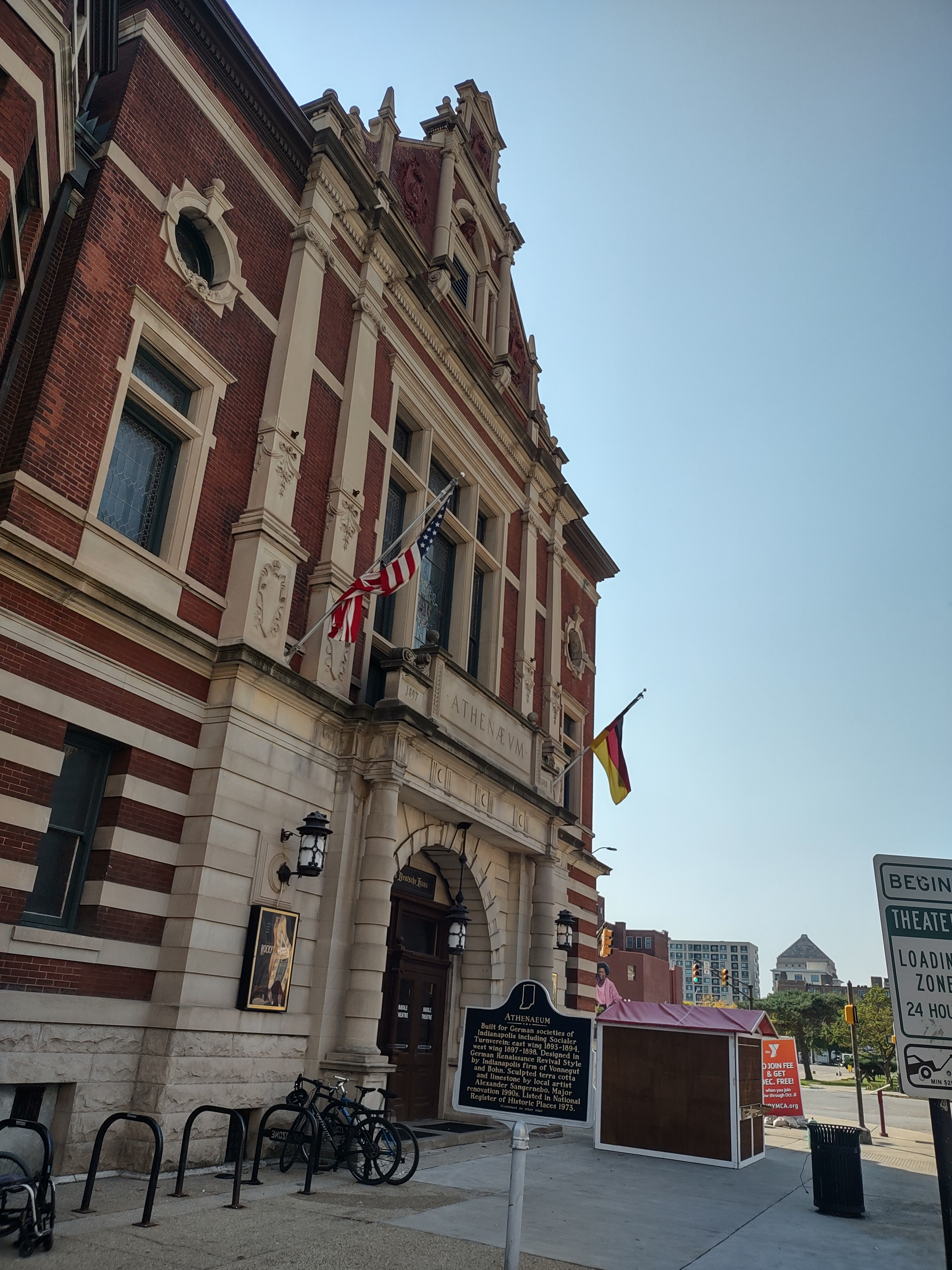
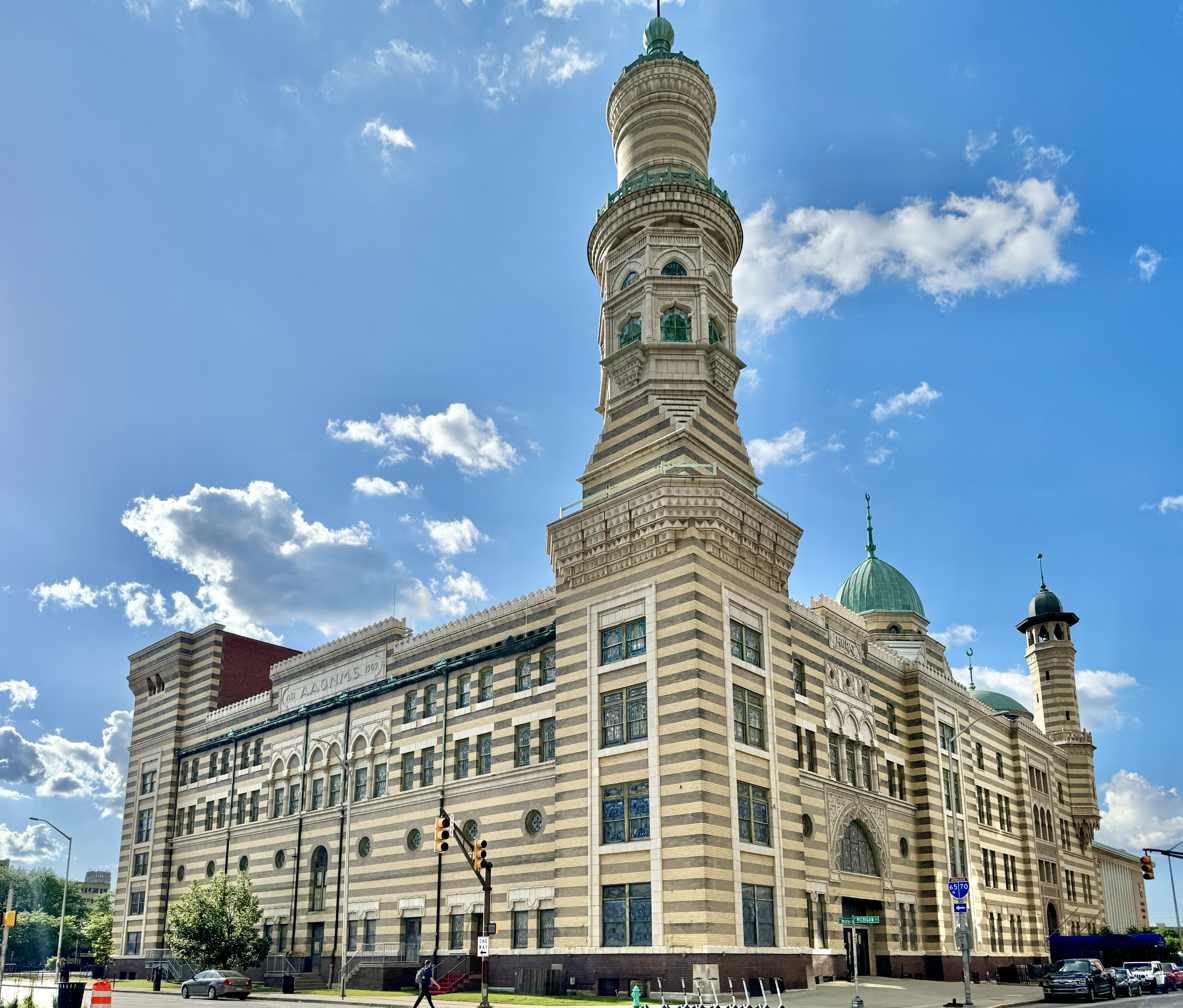
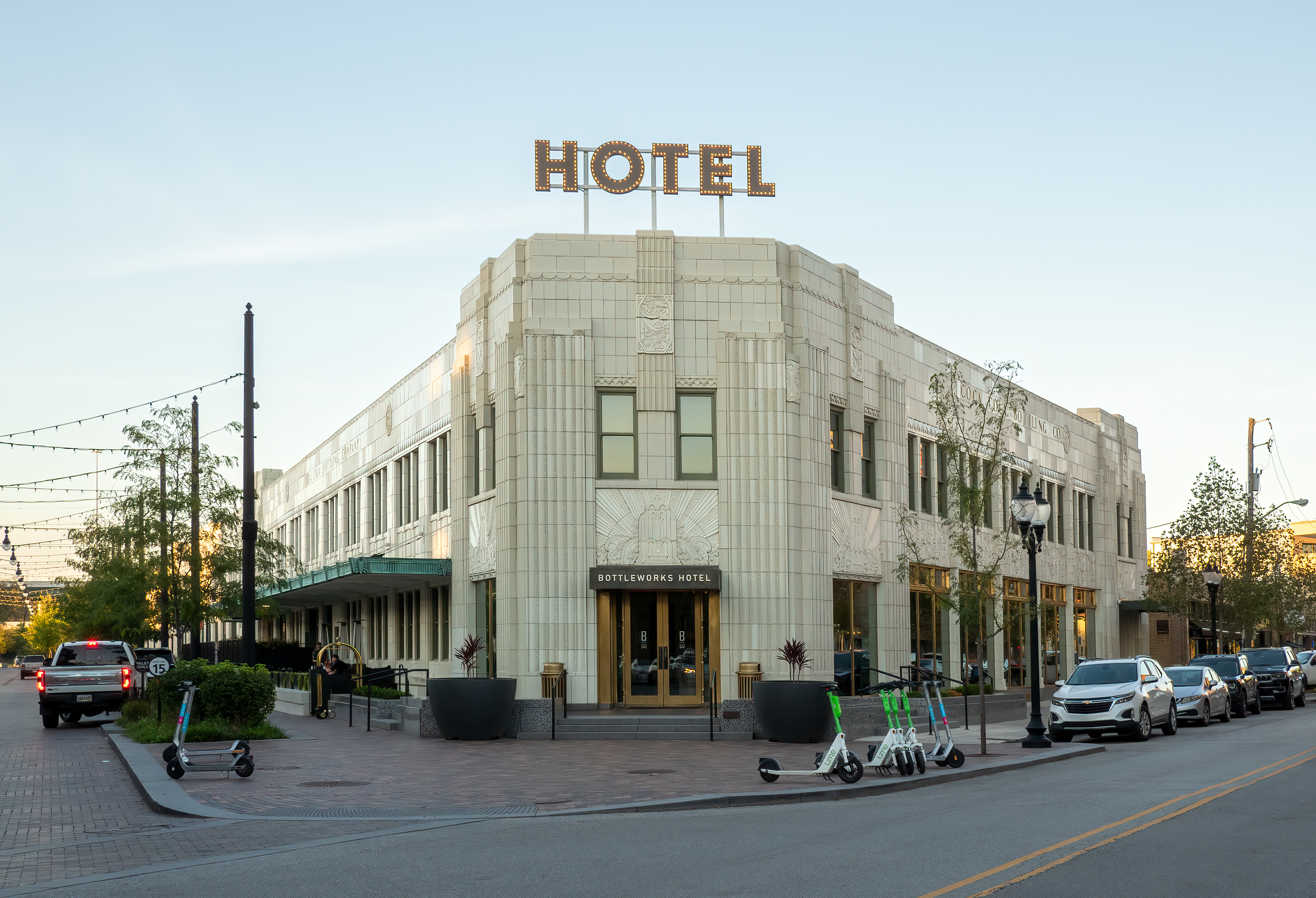
- 300 block of Massachusetts Avenue The Athenæum Old National Centre Bottleworks Hotel
- Interactive map of Mass Ave Cultural Arts District
- Coordinates: 39°46′30″N 86°8′55″W
- Country: United States
- State: Indiana
- County: Marion
- City: Indianapolis
- Area code: 317 / 463

The Mass Ave Cultural Arts District, colloquially known as Mass Ave, is a designated cultural district in Indianapolis, Indiana, United States. The district centers on 0.86 miles (1.38 km) of its namesake Massachusetts Avenue, from its southern terminus at New York and Delaware streets to its northern terminus at Bellefontaine Street. The avenue is one of the four original diagonal streets included in Alexander Ralston's plan of 1821. Mass Ave also contains the Massachusetts Avenue Commercial District, a historic district included on the National Register of Historic Places since 1982.

Beginning in the 1990s, redevelopment helped propel the area from squalor to one of the city's more fashionable addresses. Today it lies at the heart of the city's unofficial theater district, home to the Athenaeum and Old National Centre. Dozens of locally owned and operated boutiques, bars, restaurants, and commercial offices line the avenue. The district also encompasses portions of the Bottleworks District, a mixed-use redevelopment on the northeast side of the district.

== Massachusetts Avenue Commercial District ==
- Massachusetts Avenue Commercial District
- U.S. National Register of Historic Places
- U.S. Historic district
- Location within Indianapolis Location within Indiana Location within the United States
- Location: Roughly bounded by one block to either side of Massachusetts Ave. from Delaware St. to Interstate 65, Indianapolis, Indiana
- Architectural style: Art Deco, Islamic, Italianate, Modern Movement, Renaissance Revival, Romanesque
- NRHP reference No.: 82000064 (original); 100004725 (increase)

Significant dates
- Added to NRHP: December 2, 1982
- Boundary increase: December 4, 2019

== Landmarks ==
- Athenæum (Das Deutsche Haus) is a National Historic Landmark that houses the Rathskeller restaurant, the city's oldest in operation.
- Hammond Block (Budnick's Trading Mart) is a building on the National Register of Historic Places.
- Old National Centre is the headquarters of the Indianapolis Ancient Arabic Order of the Nobles of the Mystic Shrine.

== See also ==
- Indianapolis Cultural Districts
- List of gay villages
- List of shopping streets and districts by city
- National Register of Historic Places listings in Center Township, Marion County, Indiana
