= Tower Building (South Bend, Indiana) =

- U.S. National Register of Historic Places
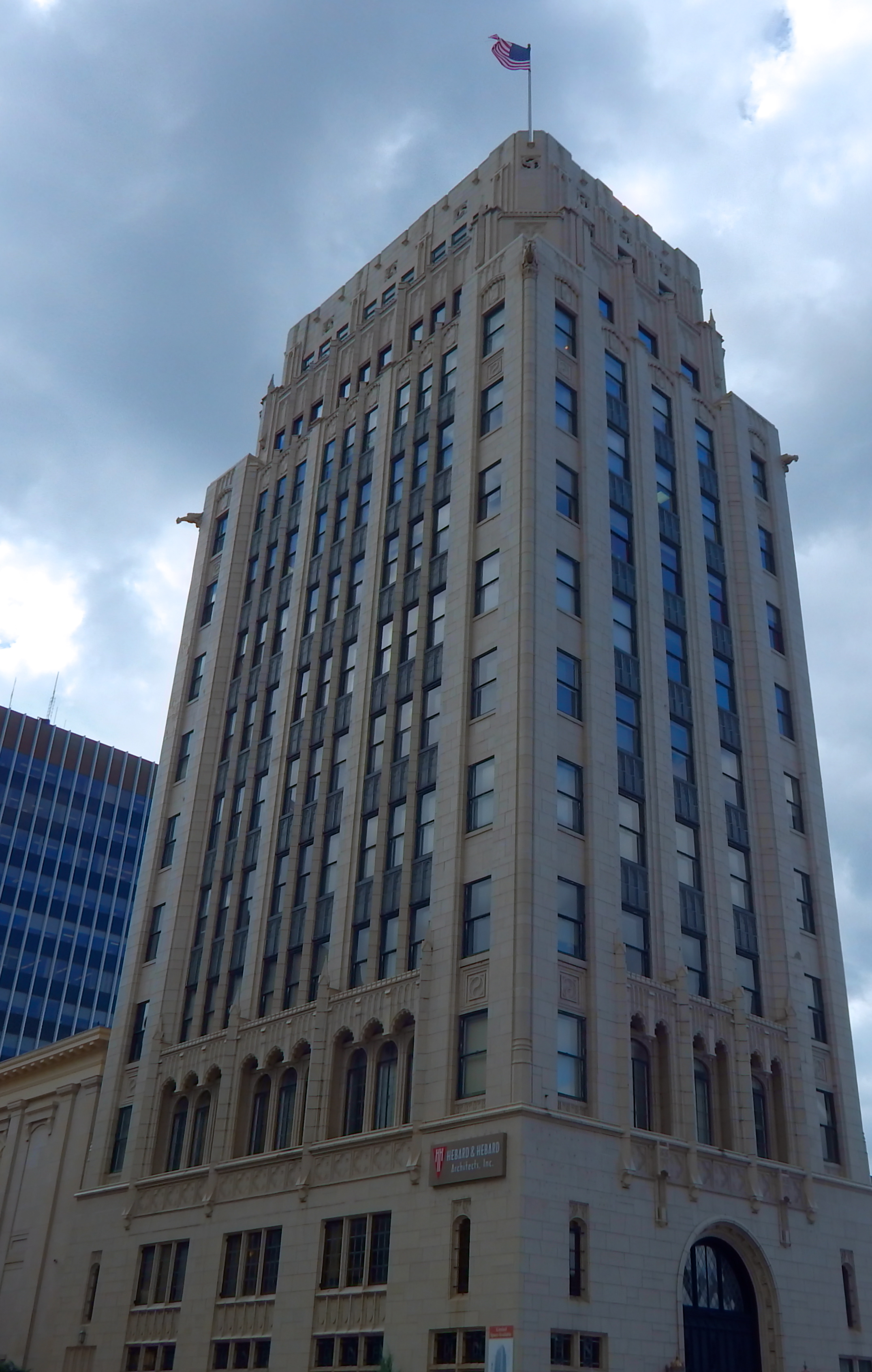
- Western side

- Location within Indiana Location within the United States
- Location: 216 W. Washington, South Bend, Indiana
- Coordinates: 41°40′34″N 86°15′10″W
- Area: Less than 1 acre (0.40 ha)
- Built: 1929
- Architect: Austin & Shambleau; H.G. Christman & Company
- Architectural style: Skyscraper Gothic
- MPS: Downtown South Bend Historic MRA
- NRHP reference No.: 85001244
- Added to NRHP: June 5, 1985

The Tower Building is a historic skyscraper in South Bend, Indiana, United States. The Tower Building is located at 216 West Washington Street, diagonally from the current St. Joseph County Courthouse, and beside the Old Courthouse. Designed by architects Austin & Shambleau, it was built in 1929. The Tower Building was originally to be built in two halves; but the western half was never built. The eastern half was completed during the Wall Street crash of 1929.

It was listed on the National Register of Historic Places in 1985 and is located in the West Washington Historic District.

The building today houses local businesses, such as Hebard & Hebard Architects, Inc., and Cullar & Associates, PC, CPAs.
