= Hammond Block (Budnick's Trading Mart) =

- U.S. National Register of Historic Places
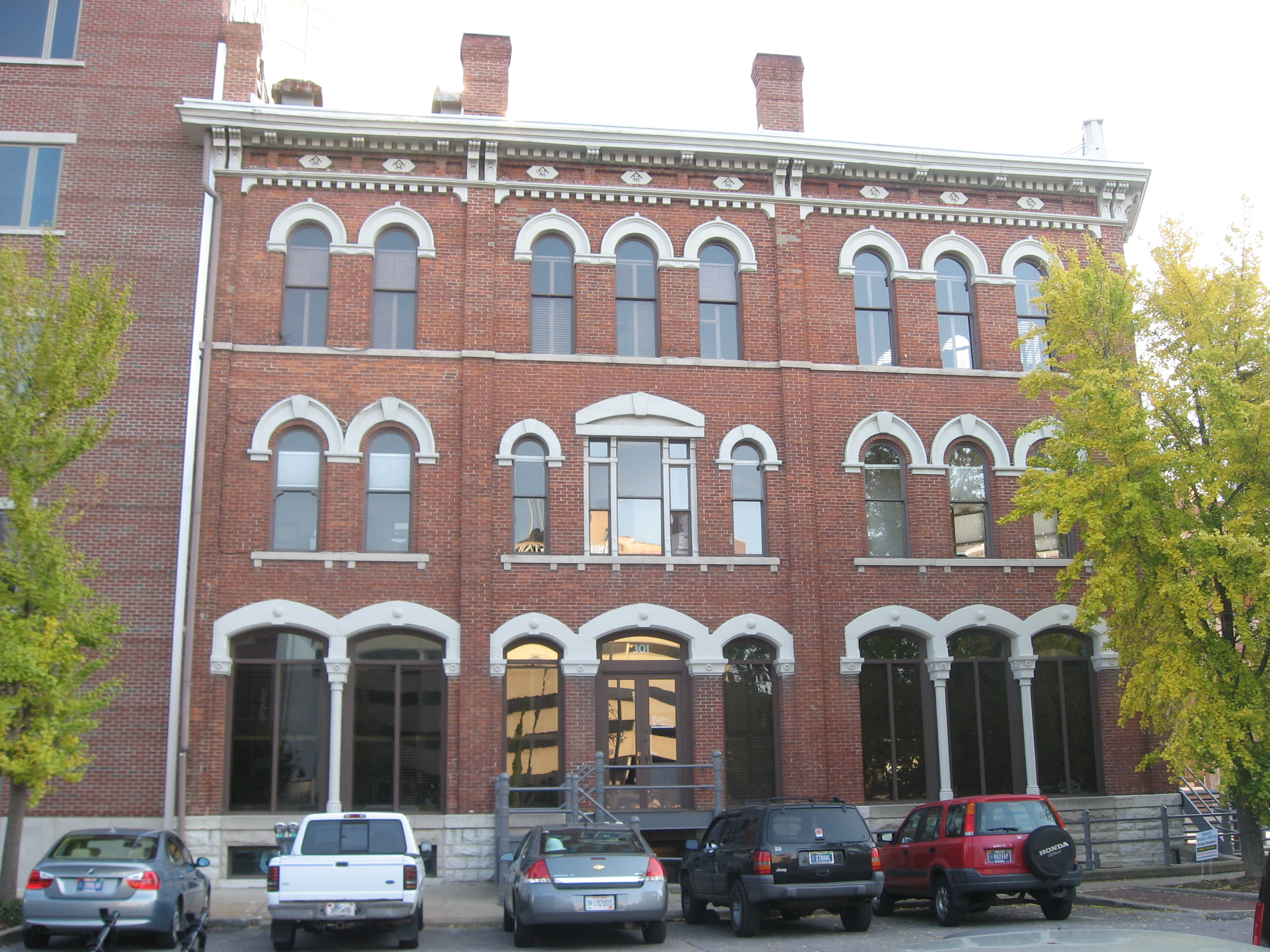
- Hammond Block (Budnick's Trading Mart), October 2010

- Location within Indianapolis Location within Indianapolis Location within Indiana Location within the United States
- Location: 301 Massachusetts Ave., Indianapolis, Indiana
- Coordinates: 39°46′17″N 86°9′13″W
- Area: less than one acre
- Built: 1874; 152 years ago
- Architectural style: Italianate, Gothic, Ruskinian Gothic
- NRHP reference No.: 79000034
- Added to NRHP: January 9, 1979

Hammond Block (Budnick's Trading Mart) is a historic commercial building in the Mass Ave Cultural Arts District of Indianapolis, Indiana, United States. It was built in 1874 and is a three-story, trapezoidal Italianate style red brick building on a limestone faced raised basement. It has a low hipped roof with a broad eave with a panelled frieze and bracketed cornice. It features cast iron decorative elements.

It was listed on the National Register of Historic Places in 1979.

== See also ==
- National Register of Historic Places listings in Center Township, Marion County, Indiana
