= Indiana Oxygen Company building =

Historic building in Indiana

- Indiana Oxygen Company
- U.S. National Register of Historic Places
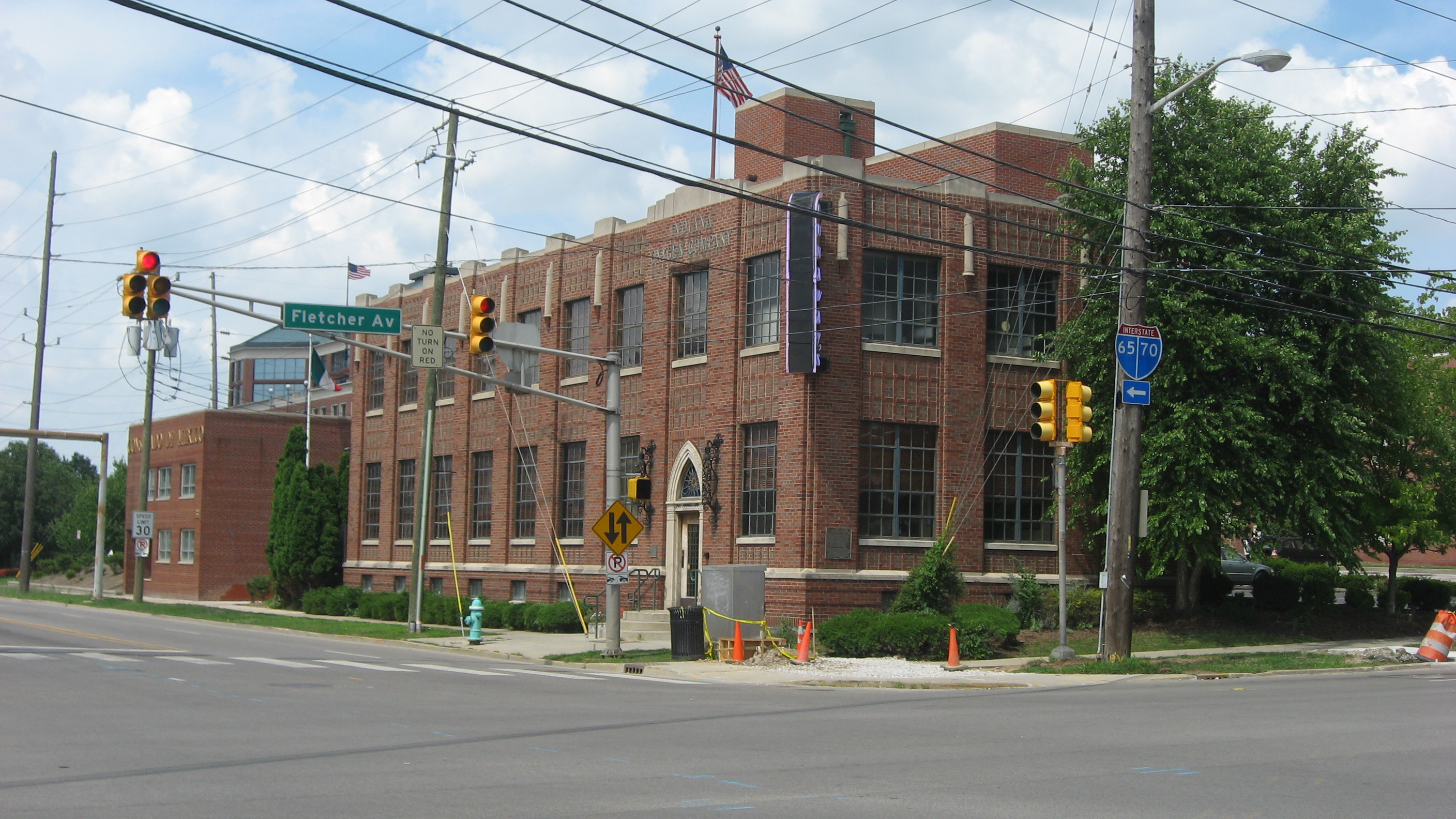
- Indiana Oxygen Company building, July 2011

- Location within Indianapolis Location within Indianapolis Location within Indiana Location within the United States
- Location: 351 South East St., Indianapolis, Indiana
- Coordinates: 39°45′41″N 86°8′56″W
- Area: less than one acre
- Built: 1930
- Built by: Fatout Building/Construction Co.; Fatout, Ray
- Architectural style: Art Deco
- NRHP reference No.: 87000545
- Added to NRHP: March 26, 1987

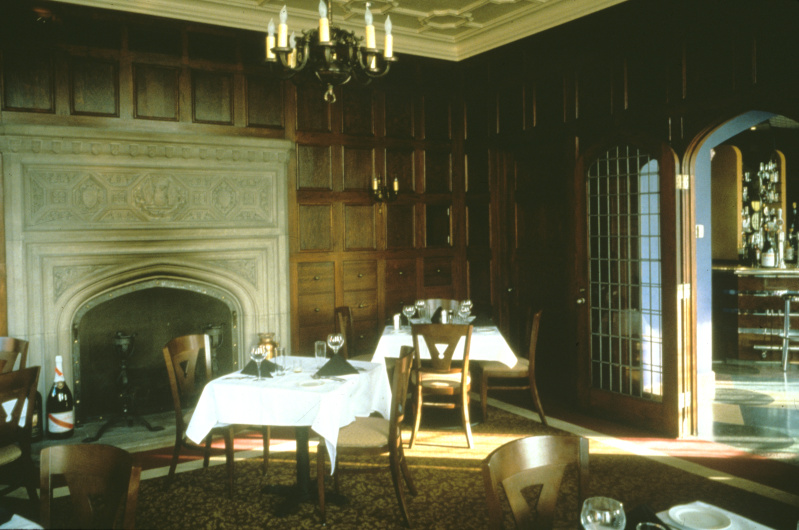
Indiana Oxygen Company Interior

The Indiana Oxygen Company Building is a historic industrial building located at Indianapolis, Indiana. It was built in 1930, and consists of a two-story, rectangular main building on a raised basement, with an attached one-story, U-shaped warehouse. Both building are constructed of brick. The main building features applied Art Deco style limestone and metal decoration.

It was listed on the National Register of Historic Places in 1987.

== See also ==
- List of Art Deco architecture in Indiana
- National Register of Historic Places listings in Center Township, Marion County, Indiana
