= Commercial Building (South Bend, Indiana) =

- U.S. National Register of Historic Places
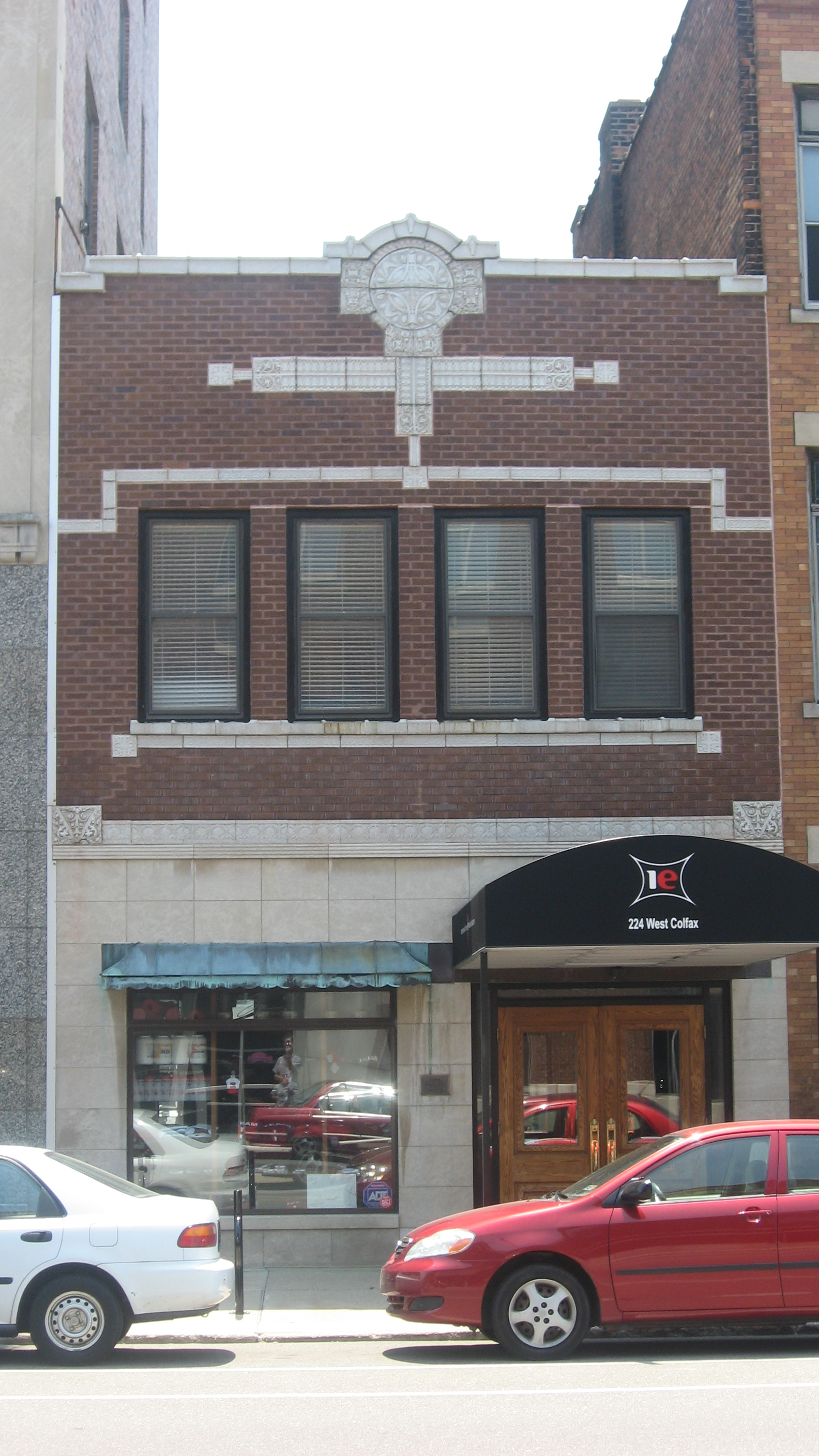
- Commercial Building, July 2012

- Location within Indiana Location within the United States
- Location: 226 W. Colfax, South Bend, Indiana
- Coordinates: 41°40′39″N 86°15′11″W
- Area: less than one acre
- Built: 1921-1922
- Architect: Schneider, Walter W.
- MPS: Downtown South Bend Historic MRA
- NRHP reference No.: 85001209
- Added to NRHP: June 5, 1985

Commercial Building is a historic commercial building located at South Bend, Indiana. It was built in 1921–1922, and is a small two-story, red brick building with terra cotta trim. The building has housed a number of small commercial enterprises. It is located between the Berteling Building and I&M Building.

It was listed on the National Register of Historic Places in 1985.
