= Bottleworks District =

Mixed-use redevelopment in Indianapolis, Indiana

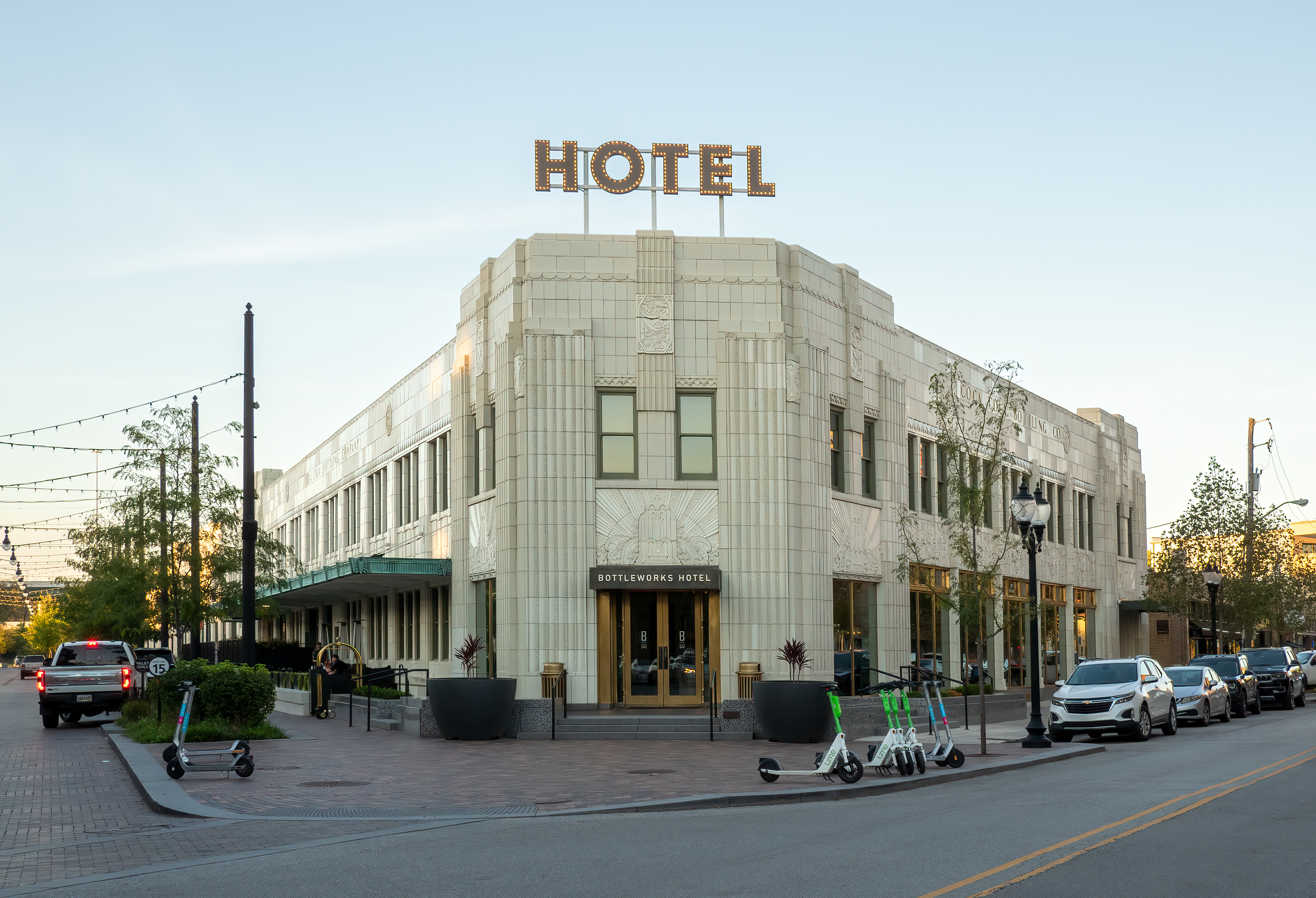
- Entrance to the Bottleworks Hotel, 2024

General information
- Status: Partially complete, additional phases planned
- Type: Retail center and mixed-use development
- Location: Indianapolis, Indiana, United States
- Coordinates: 39°46′47″N 86°08′37″W
- Owner: Hendricks Commercial Properties

Website
- https://www.bottleworksdistrict.com

The Bottleworks District is a mixed-use redevelopment district in downtown Indianapolis, Indiana, U.S. The site is located along the Mass Ave Cultural Arts District. The area formerly consisted of a large bottling plant owned by The Coca-Cola Company, alongside several smaller areas having other former uses. Construction on the district began in 2018 and it now houses multiple buildings, including a food hall, a hotel, and several retail and office spaces, as well as the headquarters and regional centers of multiple companies. The first phase of development opened in 2021, with a second phase opening four years later and two additional phases being planned.

== Background ==
The site of the Bottleworks District was initially the location of the Coca-Cola Bottling Company of Indianapolis, a bottling plant operated for The Coca-Cola Company. It was designed by the Indianapolis architectural firm Rubush & Hunter that had been responsible for several previous large-scale architectural projects across the city. The main building was constructed by the construction firm Jungclaus-Campbell Company in 1931. The facility was expanded multiple times in the 1940s, making it the largest Coca-Cola plant in the world, and at its peak, the plant employed around 300 workers and produced over two million bottles a week. The total size of the plant stood at nearly two blocks following the completion of all expansions, covering about 11 acres (4.5 ha).

In 1964, the factory was purchased by Tony Hulman, then-owner of the Indianapolis Motor Speedway. With the advent of aluminum can production, the plant fell into decline, and Hulman moved can-making operations to a nearby plant in Speedway, using the Bottleworks plant as a site for his vintage car collection. In 1968, the site was purchased by Indianapolis Public Schools, who used the former plant as a kitchen and a service center. In May 2016, IPS agreed to sell the building to allow for the redevelopment of the site.

A .78 acres (0.32 ha) portion of the site had various other previous uses, first as a residential neighborhood and auto facility, followed by a department store which ceased operations in the 1980s. In 1997, all standing buildings in the site were removed.

== Redevelopment ==
The planned redevelopment area is located on a site bounded roughly to the west by College Avenue, to the southeast by Massachusetts Avenue, to the east by Bellefontaine Avenue, and to the north by 10th Street. The site covers an area of approximately 12 acres (4.9 ha), and is located within the Mass Ave Cultural Arts District. The district contains pedestrian access to the Indianapolis Cultural Trail.

Redevelopment of the site began in 2017, when the city of Indianapolis approved the creation of a mixed-use site in what would become the Bottleworks District, with construction of the site being led by Hendricks Commercial Properties, a Wisconsin-based company. Ground testing found unusually high levels of impurities in the soil surrounding the plant, however this was not ruled a health risk to nearby neighborhoods. The expected cost of the redevelopment was around $300 million, with the first phase of construction beginning in 2018 and ending in 2021. Funding was partially provided through tax credits by the Indiana Economic Development Corporation, with significant private funding and remediation costs provided by the city of Indianapolis.

The project saw the construction of roughly 175,000 ft^{2} (16,300 m^{2}) of retail space, and 180,000 ft^{2} (17,000 m^{2}) of office space. The main building was converted into a 139-room hotel, dubbed the Bottleworks Hotel, with the design of the building mimicking the Art Deco fixtures of the old plant. The hotel opened to guests in late 2020, as part of the first phase of the project, and also contains a clubroom and several on-site dining locations. The stairwell of the hotel is designed to resemble a soda fountain, while the ceiling resembles soda fizz. The hotel is owned and operated by Geronimo Hospitality Group, a company based in Wisconsin.

In January 2021, a 36,000 ft^{2} (3,300 m^{2}) food hall, The Garage, opened as part of the redevelopment, with an expansion of that venue occurring in spring of the same year. The building occupies the former garage spaces of the plant, and upon opening housed over 20 food vendors, mostly of regionally-based companies. An eight-screen movie theater, the Living Room Theaters, was also part of the initial redevelopment.

The second phase of the project called for the construction of about 250,000 ft^{2} (23,000 m^{2}) of development that was initially planned to be mixed-use residential and office space alongside a five-story mixed-use building. However, most of the planned residential space was instead converted to office space in the final design. The expected cost of the second phase was around $100 million. Construction of the second phase, initially planned for late 2020, was delayed to the following year due to the COVID-19 pandemic and began in early 2022. Phase II was completed in mid-2025. Phase III of the project involves the construction of an 11-story, 85,000 ft^{2} (7,900 m^{2}) office building, which will become the new headquarters of law firm Ice Miller. The building will replace the site of an old parking lot. Phase III is expected to be completed in 2028. A fourth phase, which involves the addition of a mixed-use residential space by the Garage Food Hall, is also planned.

== Impact ==
The construction of the district significantly improved traffic flow and access for pedestrians, as the project reconnected several streets with the larger grid networks. Multiple corporations have also relocated their operations to areas within the Bottleworks District. In 2024, Indiana Members Credit Union, an organization with over 160,000 members, relocated their headquarters to an office within the district. In July 2025, Ernst & Young announced it would move its Indianapolis office to the Bottleworks District. In 2023, the site won the Cook Cup for Outstanding Restoration from Indiana Landmarks, a preservation agency. In 2024, the Bottleworks Hotel was nominated for "Best Boutique Hotel" by newspaper agency USA Today.

== See also ==
- List of Art Deco architecture in Indiana
- List of attractions and events in Indianapolis
- List of Coca-Cola buildings and structures
