= James A. Judie House =

Historic house in Indiana, United States

- U.S. National Register of Historic Places
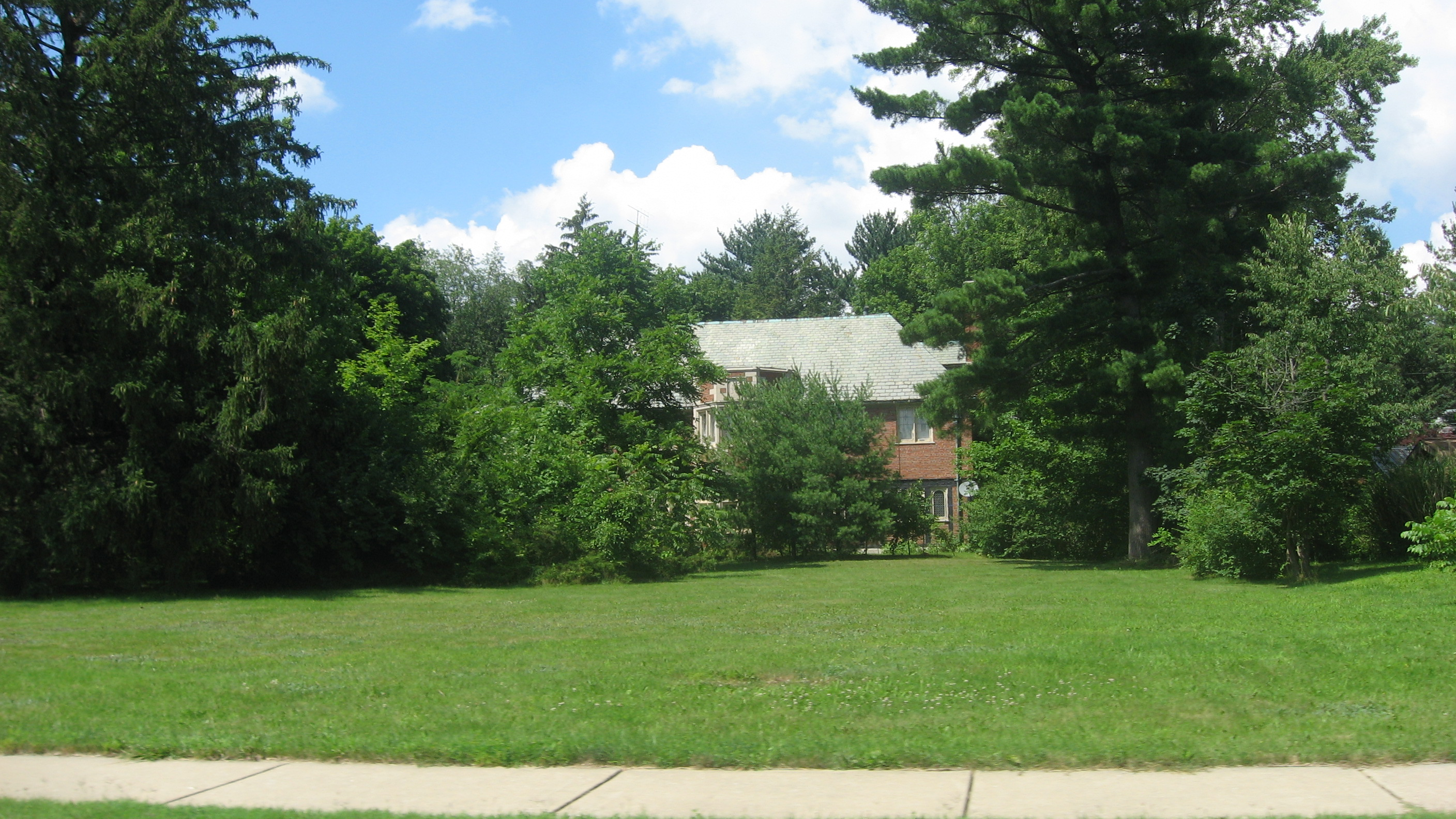
- Front of the house

- Location within Indiana Location within the United States
- Location: 1515 E. Jefferson Blvd., South Bend, Indiana
- Coordinates: 41°40′30″N 86°13′27″W
- Built: 1930
- Architect: Austin & Shambleau
- Architectural style: Tudor Revival
- NRHP reference No.: 83000146
- Added to NRHP: March 24, 1983

The James A. Judie House, also known as the Judie-Olmsted House, is a historic home located at South Bend, Indiana. It was designed by Austin & Shambleau and was built in 1930. It is a 2 1/2-story, Tudor Revival style brick dwelling with half-timbering and limestone trim. It has a slate hipped roof.

It was listed on the National Register of Historic Places in 1983.
