= Berteling Building =

- U.S. National Register of Historic Places
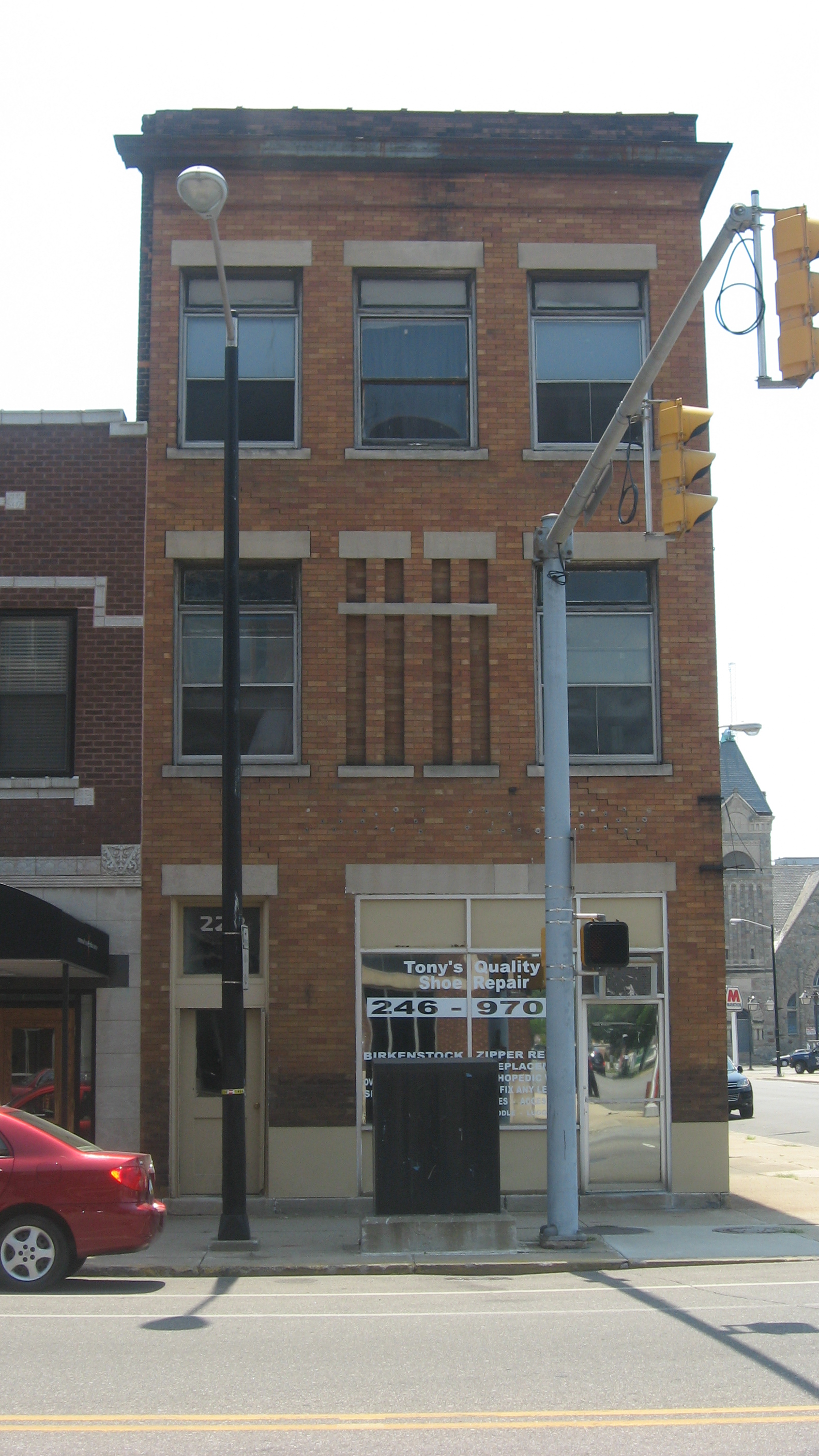
- Berteling Building, July 2012

- Location within Indiana Location within the United States
- Location: 228 W. Colfax, South Bend, Indiana
- Coordinates: 41°40′39″N 86°15′12″W
- Area: less than one acre
- Built: 1905
- Architectural style: Bungalow/craftsman, The Commercial Style
- MPS: Downtown South Bend Historic MRA
- NRHP reference No.: 85001203
- Added to NRHP: June 5, 1985

The Berteling Building, (also known as the Forbes Building) is a historic commercial building located at 228 West Colfax, South Bend, Indiana.

== Description and history ==
It was built in 1905, and is a three-story, Commercial style brick building. A small two-story, rear addition was constructed prior to 1917. The building originally housed office space for several doctors. It is located next to the Commercial Building. It is significant as one of the oldest commercial buildings in South Bend.

It was listed on the National Register of Historic Places on June 5, 1985.
