= Shortridge–Meridian Street Apartments Historic District =

Historic district in Indiana, United States

- U.S. National Register of Historic Places
- U.S. Historic district
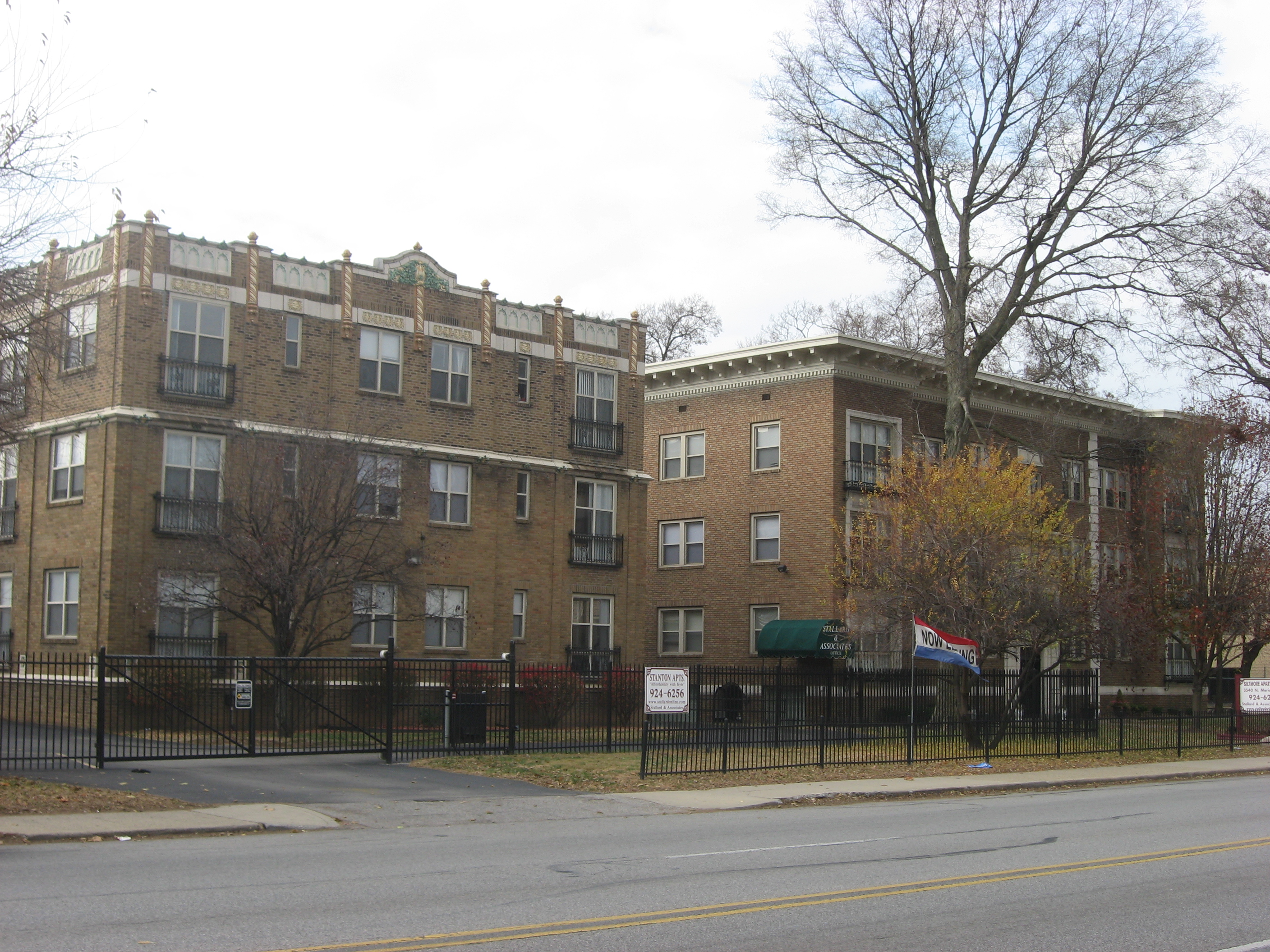
- Shortridge–Meridian Street Apartments Historic District, November 2010

- Location within Indianapolis Location within Indiana Location within the United States
- Location: Roughly bet. 34th and 38th Sts., along N. Meridian and N. Pennsylvania Sts., Indianapolis, Indiana
- Coordinates: 39°49′16″N 86°09′24″W
- Area: 70 acres (28 ha)
- Architect: George and Zimmerman; Dietz, H. Ziegler, et al.
- Architectural style: Colonial Revival, Classical Revival, ET AL.
- NRHP reference No.: 00000195
- Added to NRHP: March 15, 2000

Shortridge–Meridian Street Apartments Historic District is a national historic district located at Indianapolis, Indiana. The district encompasses 136 contributing buildings in a predominantly residential section of Indianapolis. It was developed between about 1900 and 1951, and includes representative examples of Colonial Revival, Classical Revival, Late Gothic Revival, Mission Revival, Renaissance Revival, Bungalow / American Craftsman, and Art Deco style architecture. Located in the district is the separately listed Shortridge High School. Other notable buildings include the Vernon Court Apartments (1928), Fronenac Apartments (1951), Biltmore Apartments (1927), Meridian Apartments (1929), New Yorker Apartments (1917), Howland Manor (1929), Powell-Evans House (1911), Harms House (1906), Dorchester Apartments (1921), and Martin Manor Apartments (1916).

It was listed on the National Register of Historic Places in 2000.

== See also ==
- National Register of Historic Places listings in Center Township, Marion County, Indiana
