= Marquette School =

- U.S. National Register of Historic Places
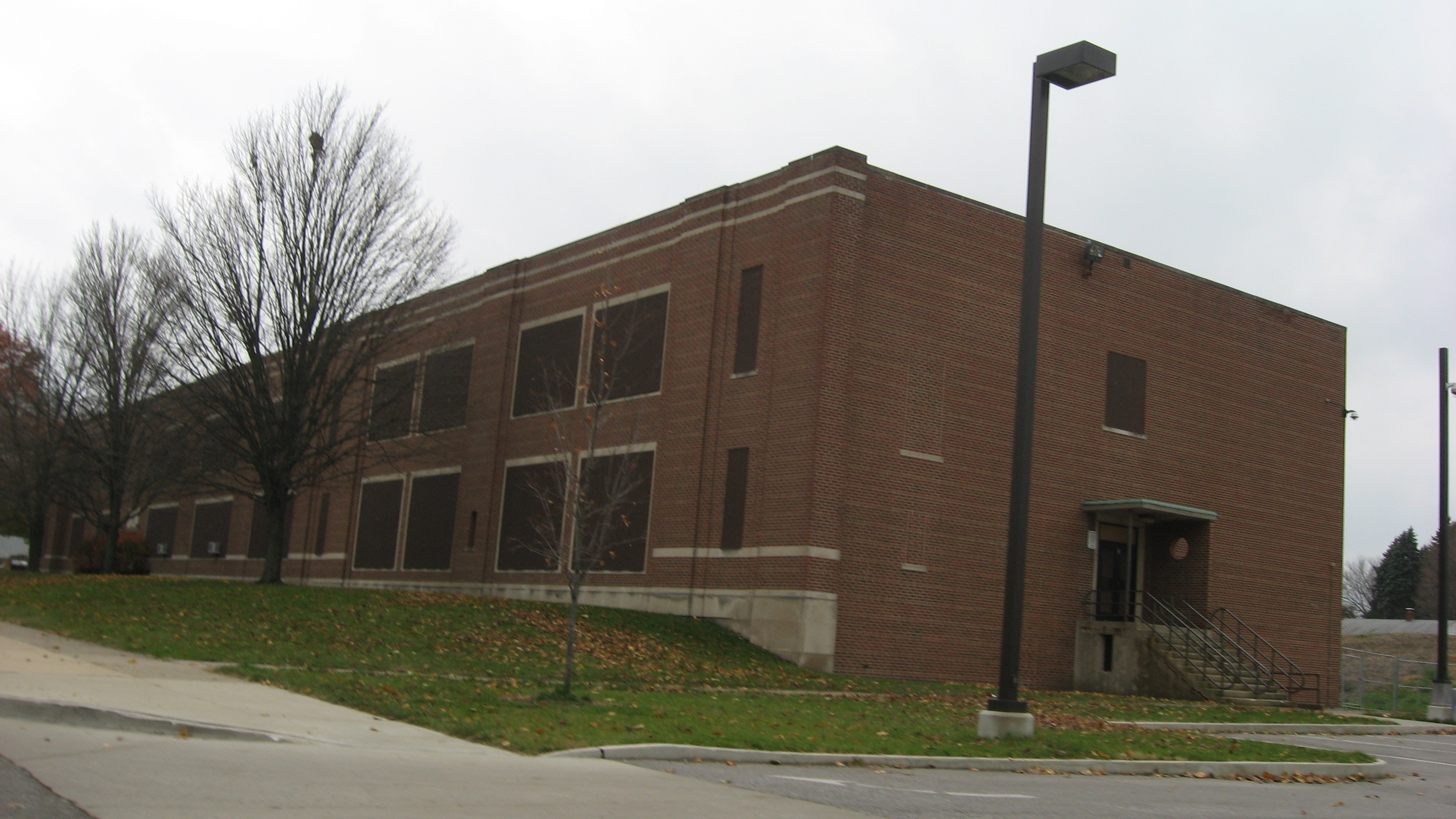
- Marquette School, November 2013

- Location within Indiana Location within the United States
- Location: 1905 College Ave., South Bend, Indiana
- Coordinates: 41°42′07″N 86°16′38″W
- Area: 1.6 acres (0.65 ha)
- Built: c. 1936-1937
- Built by: Hickey, Thomas L.
- Architect: Austin and Shambleau
- Architectural style: Art Deco
- MPS: Indiana's Public Common and High Schools MPS
- NRHP reference No.: 13000726
- Added to NRHP: September 18, 2013

Marquette School is a historic school building located in South Bend, Indiana. It was designed by Austin & Shambleau and built in 1936–1937 with funds provided by the Public Works Administration. It is a two-story, Art Deco style brick building with additions constructed in 1948 and 1953. The school houses an auditorium, gymnasium, and classrooms. It remained in use as a school until 2010.

It was listed on the National Register of Historic Places in 2013.
