= The Alameda (Indianapolis, Indiana) =

- Alameda
- U.S. National Register of Historic Places
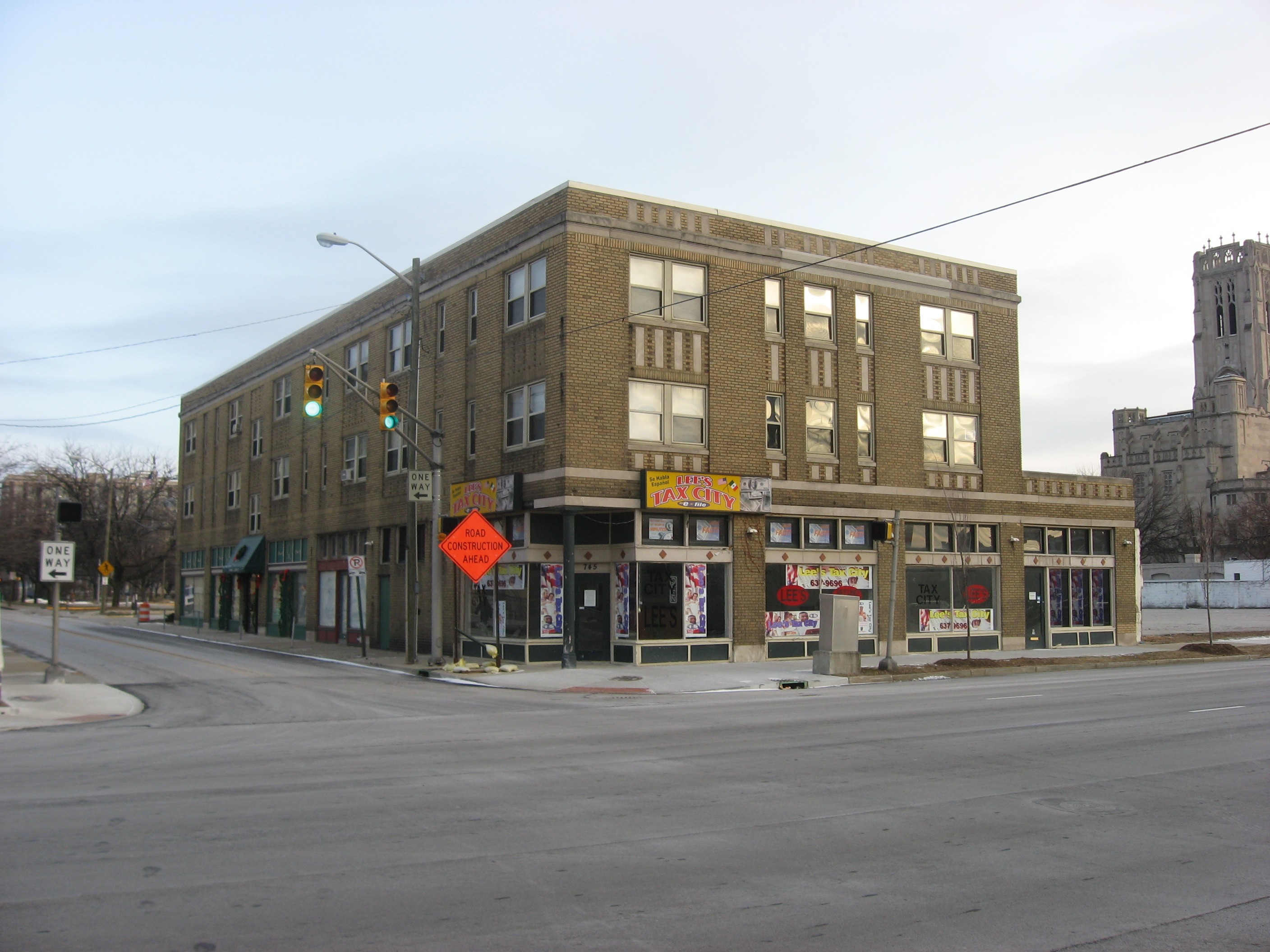
- The Alameda, January 2010

- Location within Indianapolis Location within Indianapolis Location within Indiana Location within the United States
- Location: 37 W. St. Clair St., Indianapolis, Indiana
- Coordinates: 39°46′41″N 86°9′33″W
- Area: less than one acre
- Built: c. 1925
- MPS: Apartments and Flats of Downtown Indianapolis TR
- NRHP reference No.: 83000052
- Added to NRHP: September 15, 1983

The Alameda is a historic apartment building located at Indianapolis, Indiana. It was built about 1925, and is a three-story, rough cast buff brick building. It has commercial storefronts on the first floor. It features distinctive spandrels with basketweave pattern brickwork.

It was listed on the National Register of Historic Places in 1983.

== See also ==
- Apartments and Flats of Downtown Indianapolis Thematic Resources
- National Register of Historic Places listings in Center Township, Marion County, Indiana
