= Firestone Tire and Rubber Store =

- U.S. National Register of Historic Places
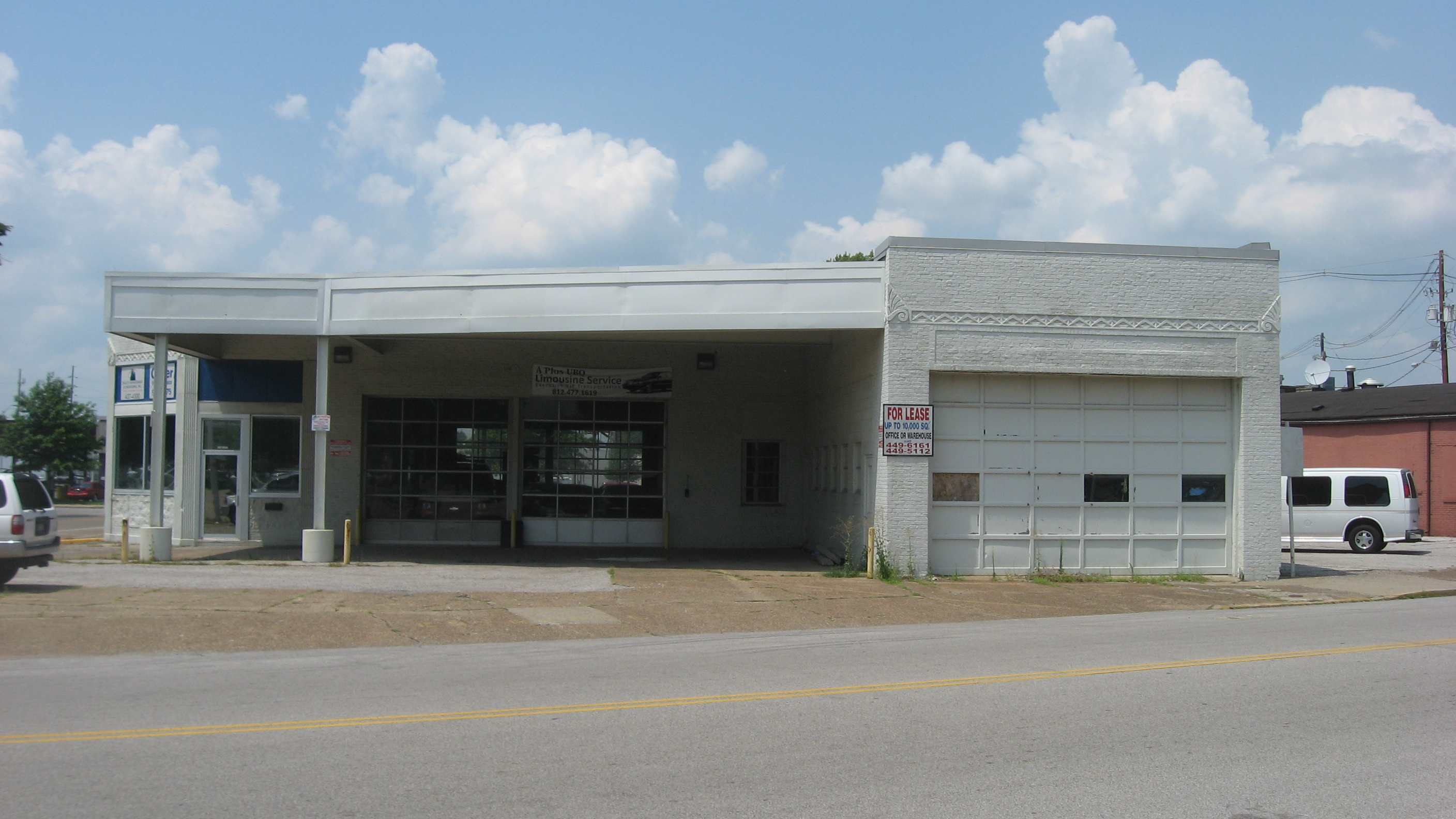
- Firestone Tire and Rubber Store, July 2011

- Location within Indiana Location within the United States
- Location: 900 Main St., Evansville, Indiana
- Coordinates: 37°58′29″N 87°33′58″W
- Area: 0.4 acres (0.16 ha)
- Built: 1930
- Architect: Fowler, Frank; Karges, H. Gilbert
- Architectural style: Art Deco
- MPS: Downtown Evansville MRA
- NRHP reference No.: 84001702
- Added to NRHP: April 6, 1984

Firestone Tire and Rubber Store is a historic commercial building located in downtown Evansville, Indiana. It was built in 1930, and is a one-story, Art Deco style building. The building was originally built to house a Firestone Tire and Rubber Company outlet.

It was listed on the National Register of Historic Places in 1984.
