= East Washington Street Historic District (Martinsville, Indiana) =

Historic district in Indiana, United States

- U.S. National Register of Historic Places
- U.S. Historic district
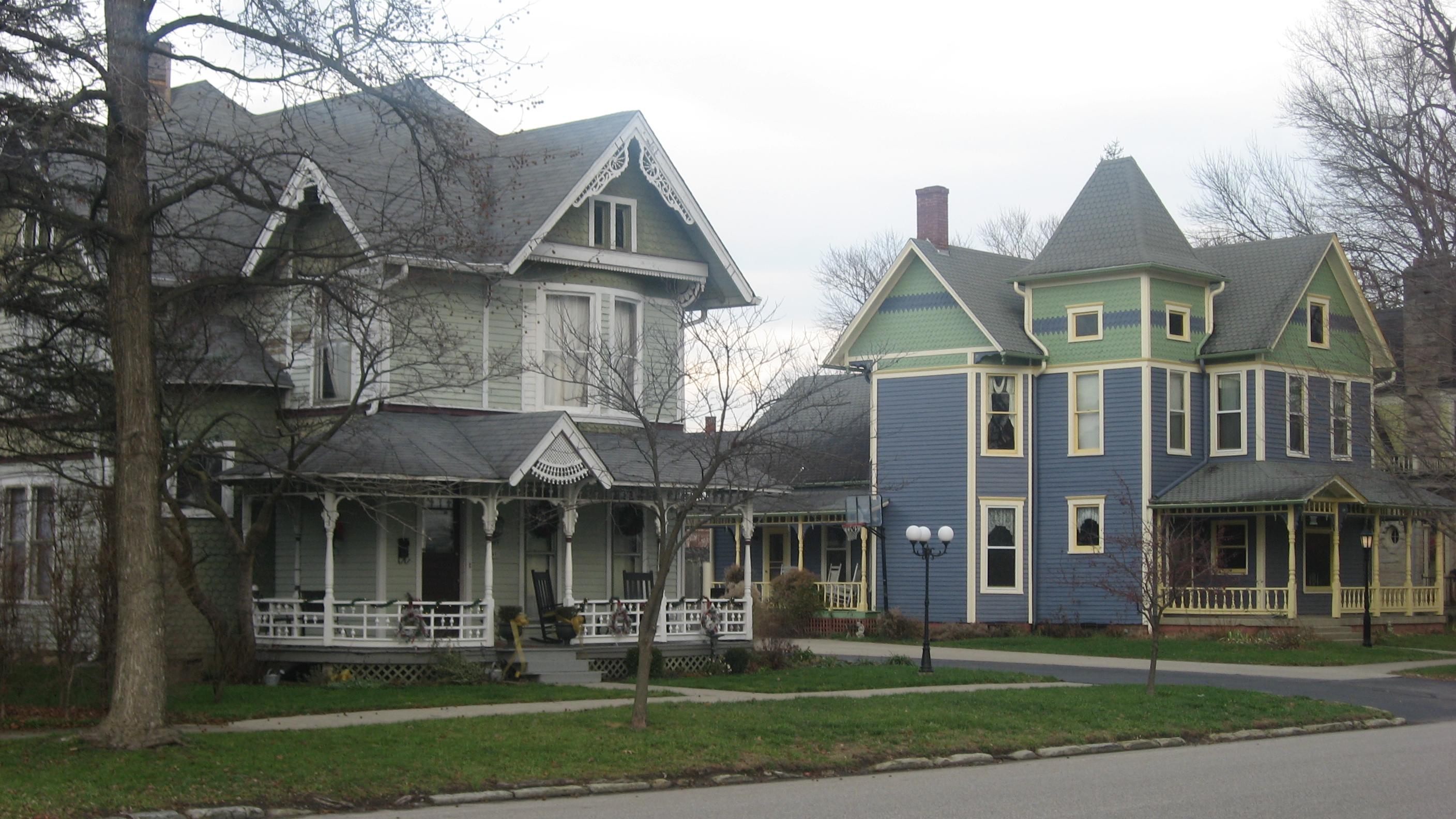
- Washington Street in Martinsville, December 2011

- Location within Indiana Location within the United States
- Location: Roughly, E. Washington St. from Sycamore to Crawford Sts., Martinsville, Indiana
- Coordinates: 39°25′37″N 86°25′17″W
- Area: 30 acres (12 ha)
- Architectural style: Classical Revival, Colonial Revival, Queen Anne
- NRHP reference No.: 97000306
- Added to NRHP: April 18, 1997

East Washington Street Historic District is a national historic district located at Martinsville, Indiana. The district encompasses 64 contributing buildings, one contributing site, and seven contributing structures in a predominantly residential section of Martinsville. It developed between about 1869 and 1940, and includes notable examples of Queen Anne, Classical Revival, and Colonial Revival style architecture. Located in the district is the separately listed Neely House. Other notable buildings include the Martinsville Presbyterian Church (1881, 1900), Sweet House (c. 1905), Gum House (c. 1890), Hubbard-Gano House (c. 1915), Frank Oak Branch House (1916), and Francesconi House (c. 1910).

It was listed on the National Register of Historic Places in 1997.
