= I and M Electric Co. Building-Transformer House and Garage =

- U.S. National Register of Historic Places
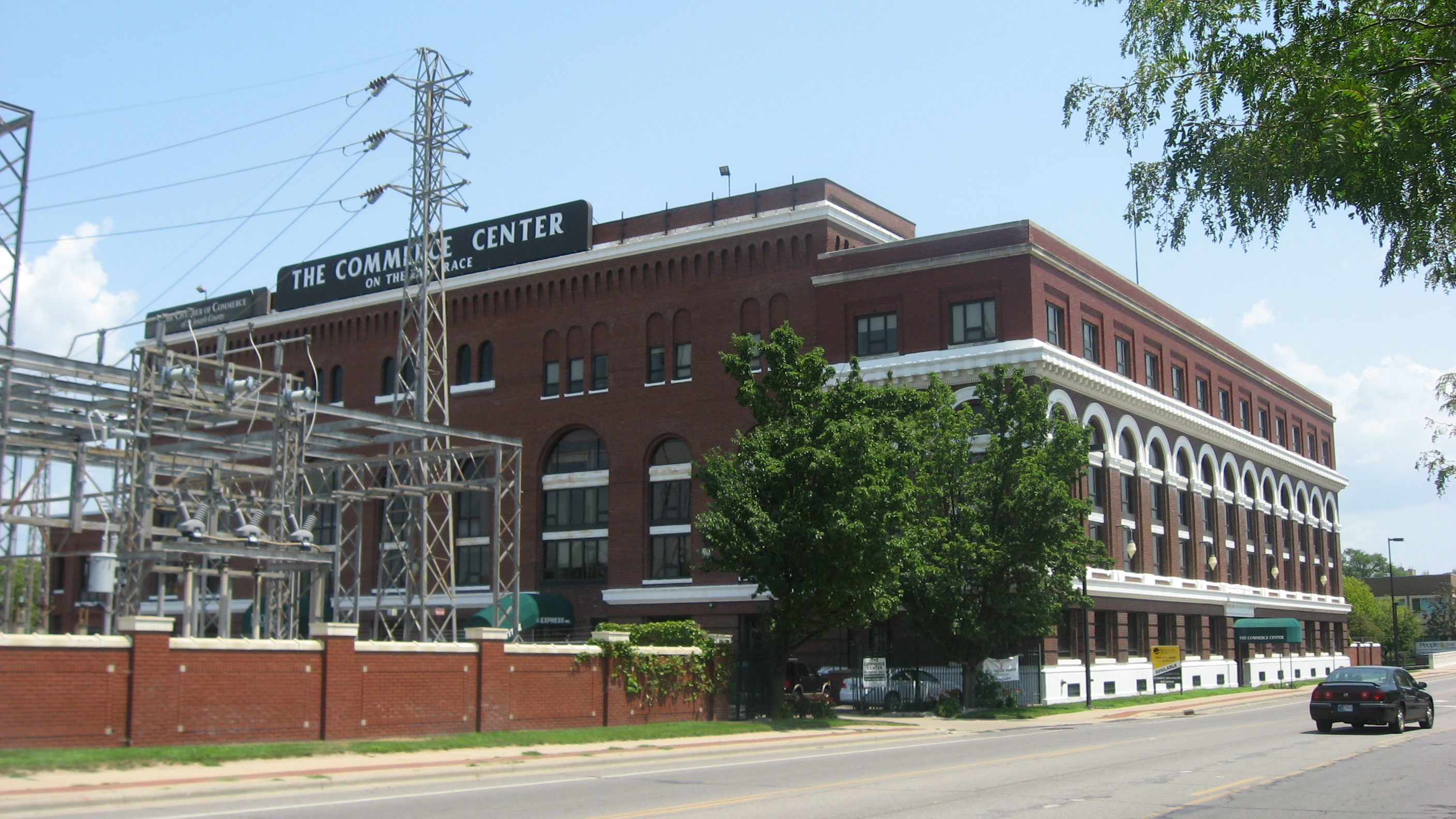
- I and M Electric Co. Building-Transformer House and Garage, July 2012

- Location within Indiana
- Location: 401 E. Colfax and 312 E. La Salle Sts., South Bend, Indiana
- Coordinates: 41°40′44″N 86°14′42″W
- Area: 4.5 acres (1.8 ha)
- Built: 1911, 1929
- Architect: Christman, H.G.
- Architectural style: Classical Revival
- MPS: East Bank MPS
- NRHP reference No.: 99000173
- Added to NRHP: February 18, 1999

I and M Electric Co. Building-Transformer House and Garage are three historic buildings located at South Bend, Indiana. The garage was built in 1929, and is a three-story, rectangular brick building. It features decorative coping and belt courses and a parapet. the transformer house is a 1 1/2-story brick building with terra cotta coping constructed in 1929. The I and M Electric Co. Building was built in 1911, and is a four- to five-story, Classical Revival style brick and stone building. The buildings were built for the Indiana and Michigan Electric Company, which operated an electric plant on the site into the 1970s.

It was listed on the National Register of Historic Places in 1999.

== See also ==
- I&M Building
