= Neely House (Martinsville, Indiana) =

Historic house in Indiana, United States

- U.S. National Register of Historic Places
- U.S. Historic district – Contributing property
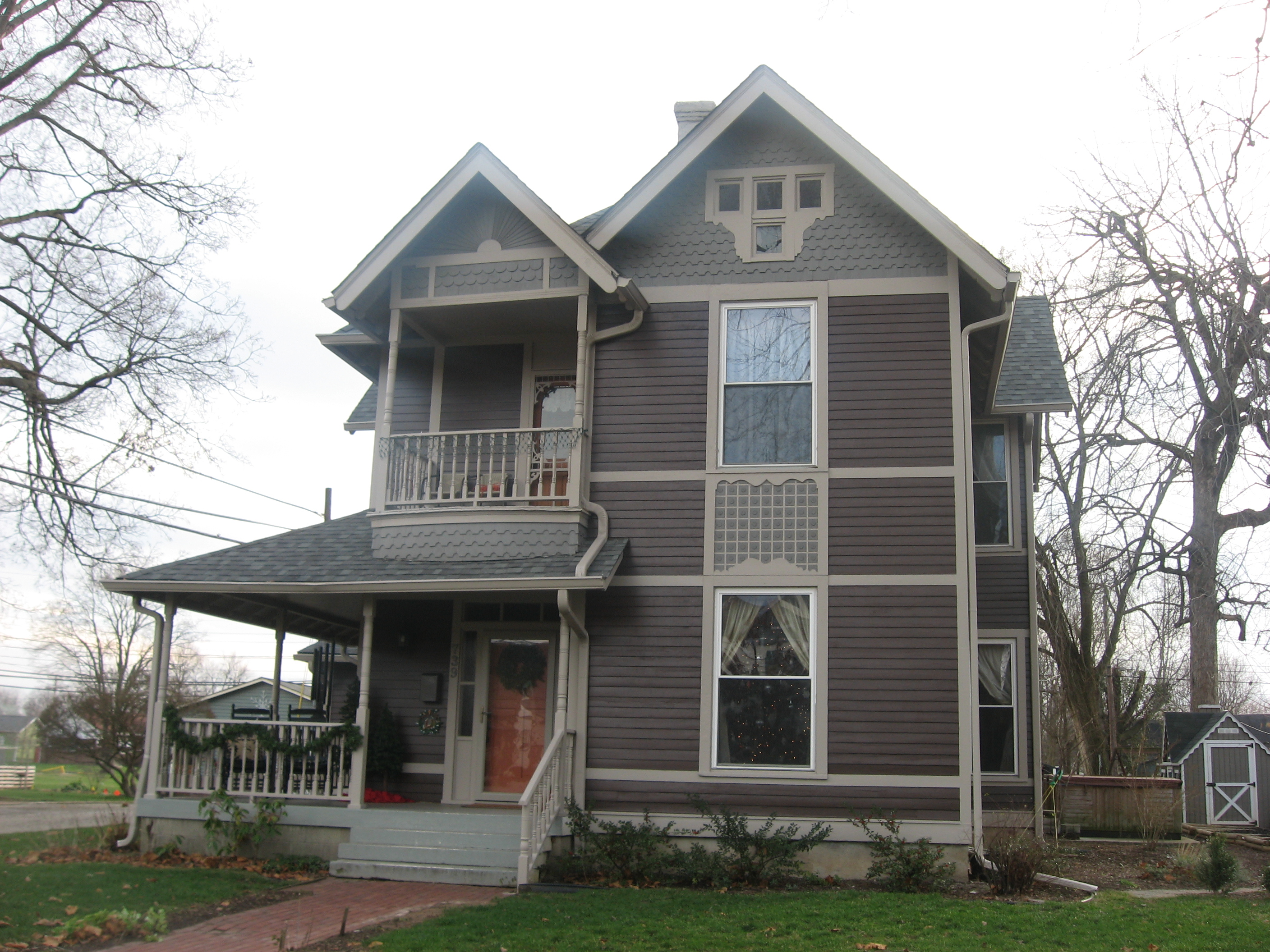
- Neely House, December 2011

- Location within Indiana Location within the United States
- Location: 739 E. Washington St., Martinsville, Indiana
- Coordinates: 39°25′43″N 86°25′9″W
- Area: less than one acre
- Built: c. 1895
- Architectural style: Queen Anne
- NRHP reference No.: 00000203
- Added to NRHP: March 15, 2000

Neely House is a historic home located at Martinsville, Indiana. It was built about 1895, and is a two-story, cruciform plan, Queen Anne style frame dwelling. It features Stick style ornamentation and a wraparound porch. It was restored in 1997.

It was listed on the National Register of Historic Places in 2000. It is located in the East Washington Street Historic District.

The name Neely house came from the first houses long-time resident Jacob M. Neely .the word Neely derived from the Gaelic word meaning "Son of the poet".
