= East Washington Street Historic District (South Bend, Indiana) =

Historic district in Indiana, United States

- U.S. National Register of Historic Places
- U.S. Historic district
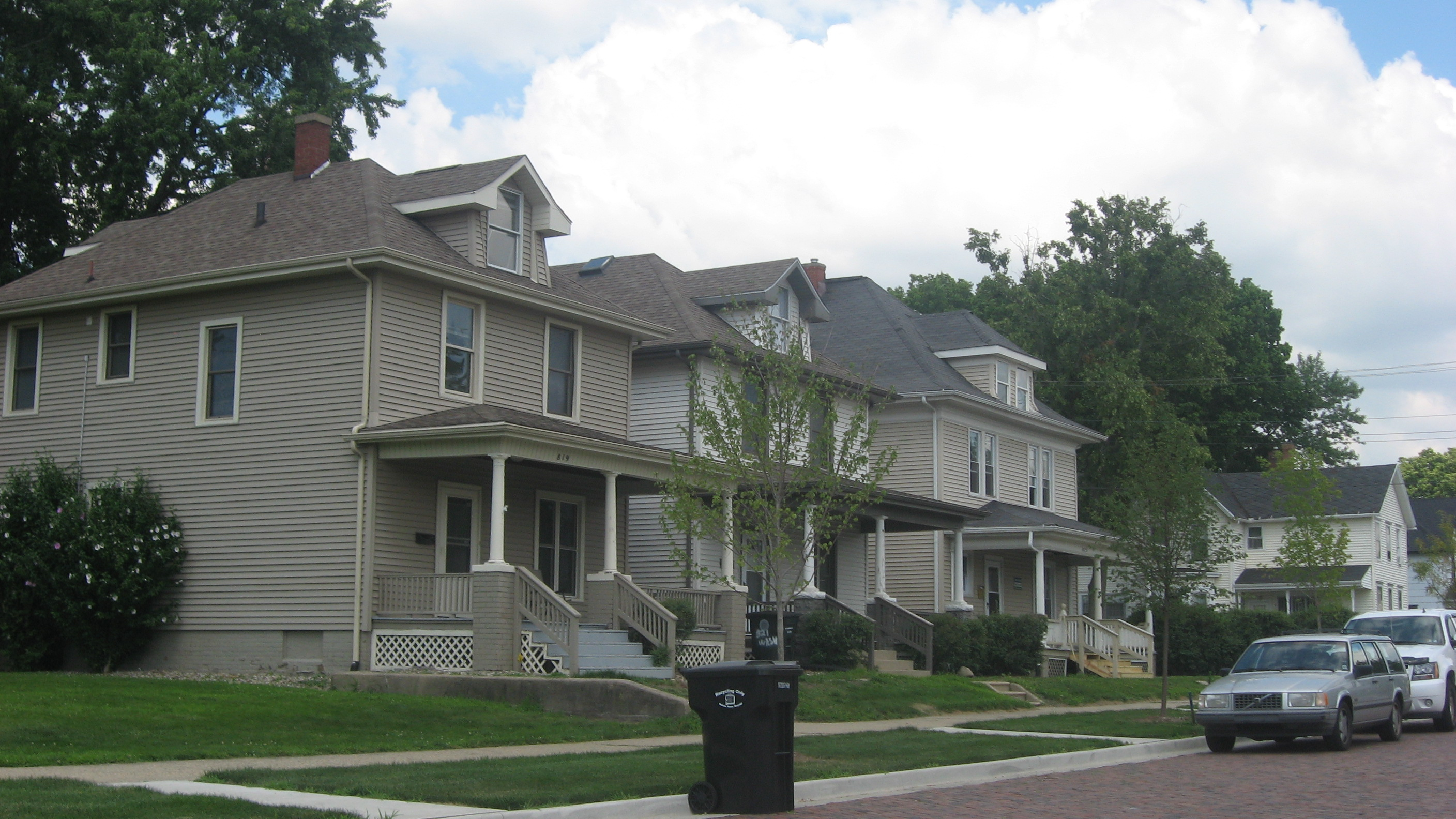
- East Washington Street Historic District, July 2013

- Location within Indiana Location within the United States
- Location: Roughly between E. Colfax and E. Washington Sts., and St. Louis Ave. and Eddy St., South Bend, Indiana
- Coordinates: 41°40′35″N 86°14′21″W
- Area: 15.5 acres (6.3 ha)
- Architect: Shambleau, N. Roy; Austin and Shambleau
- Architectural style: Italianate, Colonial Revival, American Four Square
- MPS: East Bank MPS
- NRHP reference No.: 99000182
- Added to NRHP: February 18, 1999

East Washington Street Historic District is a national historic district located at South Bend, Indiana. It encompasses 71 contributing buildings and one contributing structure in a predominantly residential section of South Bend. It developed between about 1880 and 1947, and includes notable examples of Italianate, Colonial Revival, American Foursquare, and Bungalow / American Craftsman style architecture and works by architects Austin & Shambleau. Notable buildings include the James and Marie Zimmerman House (1921), Eger House (1911), George and Emma Hewitt House (1905), Ruth and Edwin H. Sommerer House (1930), Chauncey T. Fassett House (1898), Dougdale Carriage Barn (1900), and Sunnyside Presbyterian Church (1923, 1951).

It was listed on the National Register of Historic Places in 1999.
