= I & M Building =

- U.S. National Register of Historic Places
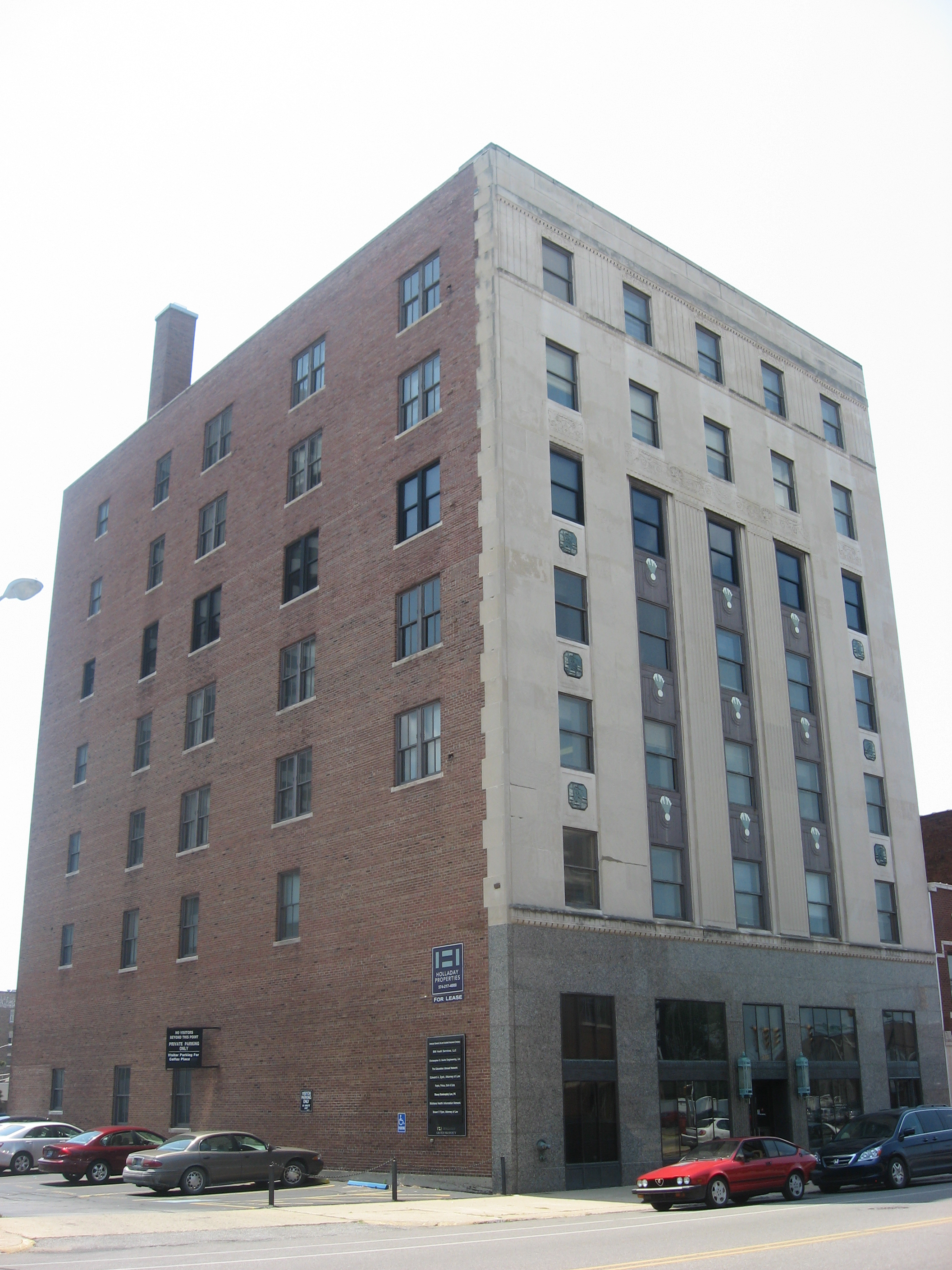
- Front and eastern side

- Location within Indiana Location within the United States
- Location: 220 W. Colfax, South Bend, Indiana
- Coordinates: 41°40′39″N 86°15′10″W
- Area: less than one acre
- Built: 1929
- Architect: Austin & Shambleau
- Architectural style: Art Deco
- MPS: Downtown South Bend Historic MRA
- NRHP reference No.: 85001215
- Added to NRHP: June 5, 1985

The I & M Building, also known as Colfax Place, is a historic building located at 220 W. Colfax in South Bend, Indiana. It is located next to the Commercial Building. The building, which was built in 1929, originally housed the offices of the Indiana and Michigan Electric Company. The Art Deco building was designed by Austin & Shambleau. The seven-story building is faced in marble on its front first story, limestone on the remainder of its front, and brick on its sides. Terra cotta separates the building's front center windows through the fifth story, while stone with terra cotta features separate the side windows. The building is one of the few Art Deco structures in South Bend and the only "pure" example of the style within its downtown business district.

The building was listed on the National Register of Historic Places in 1985. After a brief tenure as a condominium development, the building is now used as office space.

== See also ==
- I and M Electric Co. Building-Transformer House and Garage
