= National Register of Historic Places listings in St. Joseph County, Indiana =

Location of St. Joseph County in Indiana

This is a list of the National Register of Historic Places listings in St. Joseph County, Indiana.

This is intended to be a complete list of the properties and districts on the National Register of Historic Places in St. Joseph County, Indiana, United States. Latitude and longitude coordinates are provided for many National Register properties and districts; these locations may be seen together in a map.

There are 102 properties and districts listed on the National Register in the county, including one National Historic Landmark. Another four properties were once listed but have been removed.

Properties and districts located in incorporated areas display the name of the municipality, while properties and districts in unincorporated areas display the name of their civil township. Properties and districts split between multiple jurisdictions display the names of all jurisdictions.

This National Park Service list is complete through NPS recent listings posted August 28, 2026.

== Current listings ==
	Name on the Register	Image	Date listed	Location	City or town	Description
1	All American Bank Building	All American Bank Building	June 5, 1985 (#85001202)	111 W. Washington; 41°40′36″N 86°15′02″W	South Bend	
2	Battell Park Historic District	Battell Park Historic District	January 11, 1996 (#95001541)	Mishawaka Ave. 41°39′56″N 86°11′14″W	Mishawaka	
3	Beiger House	Beiger House	August 28, 1973 (#73000042)	317 E. Lincolnway; 41°39′39″N 86°10′38″W	Mishawaka	
4	W.N. Bergan-J.C. Lauber Co. Building	W.N. Bergan-J.C. Lauber Co. Building	February 18, 1999 (#99000180)	502-504 E. La Salle St. 41°40′44″N 86°14′39″W	South Bend	
5	Berteling Building	Berteling Building	June 5, 1985 (#85001203)	228 W. Colfax Ave. 41°40′39″N 86°15′12″W	South Bend	
6	Blackstone-State Theater	Blackstone-State Theater	June 5, 1985 (#85001204)	212 S. Michigan St. 41°40′28″N 86°15′00″W	South Bend	
7	Bowman Creek Stone Arch Culvert		August 31, 2026 (#100013346)	Lincoln Way East over Bowman Creek; 41°39′53″N 86°14′12″W	South Bend	
8	Cathedral of St. James and Parish Hall	Cathedral of St. James and Parish Hall	June 5, 1985 (#85001205)	115 and 117 N. Lafayette Boulevard; 41°40′37″N 86°15′14″W	South Bend	
9	Central High School & Boys Vocational School	Central High School & Boys Vocational School	June 5, 1985 (#85001206)	115 N. St. James Court; 41°40′37″N 86°15′17″W	South Bend	
10	Chapin Park Historic District	Chapin Park Historic District	February 4, 1982 (#82000073)	Roughly bounded by the St. Joseph River, Main, Madison, Rex, Lindsey, and William Sts., and Leland and Portage Aves. 41°41′06″N 86°15′19″W	South Bend	
11	Horatio Chapin House	Horatio Chapin House	August 11, 1980 (#80000064)	601 Park Ave. 41°41′00″N 86°15′20″W	South Bend	
12	Children's Dispensary	Children's Dispensary	December 24, 1997 (#97001541)	1045 W. Washington; 41°40′35″N 86°15′58″W	South Bend	
13	Citizens Bank	Citizens Bank	June 5, 1985 (#85001207)	112 W. Jefferson; 41°40′29″N 86°15′04″W	South Bend	
14	Colonial Gardens Commercial Historic District	Colonial Gardens Commercial Historic District	December 15, 1997 (#97001540)	2919-3027 Mishawaka Ave. 41°39′57″N 86°12′20″W	South Bend	
15	Commercial Building	Commercial Building	June 5, 1985 (#85001209)	224 W. Colfax Ave. 41°40′39″N 86°15′12″W	South Bend	
16	Dille-Probst House	Dille-Probst House	March 17, 1994 (#94000224)	520 E. Colfax Ave. 41°40′39″N 86°14′36″W	South Bend	
17	Dodge House	Dodge House	September 8, 1978 (#78000052)	415 E. Lincolnway; 41°39′39″N 86°10′34″W	Mishawaka	
18	East Washington Street Historic District	East Washington Street Historic District	February 18, 1999 (#99000182)	Roughly between E. Colfax Ave. and E. Washington St., St. Louis Ave., and Eddy St. 41°40′35″N 86°14′21″W	South Bend	
19	Edgewater Place Historic District		January 16, 2026 (#100012559)	Between Lincolnway on the west, St. Joseph River on the east, Monroe Street on the north, and south of Bronson Street on the south 41°40′13″N 86°14′27″W	South Bend	
20	Maurice Egan House	Maurice Egan House	February 18, 1999 (#99000175)	1136 N. Notre Dame Ave. 41°41′28″N 86°14′16″W	South Bend	
21	Eller-Hosford House	Eller-Hosford House	January 27, 1983 (#83000101)	722 E. Lincolnway; 41°39′41″N 86°10′14″W	Mishawaka	
22	Ellis-Schindler House	Ellis-Schindler House	December 18, 1990 (#90001926)	900 W. Lincolnway; 41°39′38″N 86°11′29″W	Mishawaka	
23	Evergreen Hill	Evergreen Hill	April 25, 2001 (#01000410)	59449 Keria Trail, south of South Bend; 41°37′52″N 86°16′11″W	Centre Township	
24	Farmers Security Bank	Farmers Security Bank	June 5, 1985 (#85001210)	133 S. Main St. 41°40′31″N 86°15′07″W	South Bend	
25	Federal Building	Federal Building	August 3, 2015 (#15000482)	204 S. Main St. 41°40′29″N 86°15′06″W	South Bend	
26	Fire House No. 3	Fire House No. 3	February 18, 1999 (#99000177)	219 N. Hill St. 41°40′43″N 86°14′36″W	South Bend	
27	Fire House No. 7	Fire House No. 7	February 18, 1999 (#99000170)	803 N. Notre Dame Ave. 41°41′10″N 86°14′18″W	South Bend	
28	Former First Presbyterian Church	Former First Presbyterian Church	June 5, 1985 (#85001211)	101 S. Lafayette Boulevard; 41°40′34″N 86°15′14″W	South Bend	
29	Hager House	Hager House	June 5, 1985 (#85001212)	415 W. Wayne St. 41°40′26″N 86°15′20″W	South Bend	
30	Haven Hubbard Home	Haven Hubbard Home	March 20, 2013 (#13000091)	31895 Chicago Trail, northeast of New Carlisle; 41°43′51″N 86°28′56″W	Olive Township	
31	W.R. Hinkle and Co.	W.R. Hinkle and Co.	June 5, 1985 (#85001213)	225 N. Lafayette Boulevard; 41°40′43″N 86°15′14″W	South Bend	
32	Martin Hoban House	Martin Hoban House	February 18, 1999 (#99000171)	205 N. St. Louis Boulevard; 41°40′41″N 86°14′30″W	South Bend	
33	Hoffman Hotel	Hoffman Hotel	June 5, 1985 (#85001214)	120 W. LaSalle; 41°40′44″N 86°15′05″W	South Bend	
34	Howard Park Historic District	Howard Park Historic District	February 18, 1999 (#99000169)	Roughly between E. Jefferson and Wayne Sts., N. Eddy, and the St. Joseph River; 41°40′25″N 86°14′32″W	South Bend	
35	I&M Building	I&M Building	June 5, 1985 (#85001215)	220 W. Colfax Ave. 41°40′39″N 86°15′11″W	South Bend	
36	I and M Electric Co. Building-Transformer House and Garage	I and M Electric Co. Building-Transformer House and Garage	February 18, 1999 (#99000173)	401 E. Colfax Ave. and 312 E. LaSalle St. 41°40′41″N 86°14′46″W	South Bend	
37	J.M.S. Building	J.M.S. Building	June 5, 1985 (#85001216)	108 N. Main St. 41°40′36″N 86°15′06″W	South Bend	
38	James A. Judie House	James A. Judie House	March 24, 1983 (#83000146)	1515 E. Jefferson Boulevard; 41°40′30″N 86°13′28″W	South Bend	
39	Kamm and Schellinger Brewery	Kamm and Schellinger Brewery	October 11, 1979 (#79000042)	100 Center St. 41°39′45″N 86°11′25″W	Mishawaka	
40	Kelley-Fredrickson House and Office Building	Kelley-Fredrickson House and Office Building	May 24, 1984 (#84001619)	233 N. Lafayette Boulevard and 314 W. LaSalle St. 41°40′44″N 86°15′14″W	South Bend	House moved to 702 W. Colfax in 1987.
41	John G. Kerr Company	John G. Kerr Company	June 5, 1985 (#85001217)	121 W. Colfax Ave. 41°40′41″N 86°15′06″W	South Bend	
42	Knights of Columbus-Indiana Club	Knights of Columbus-Indiana Club	June 5, 1985 (#85001218)	320 W. Jefferson Boulevard; 41°40′29″N 86°15′16″W	South Bend	
43	Knights of Pythias Lodge	Knights of Pythias Lodge	June 5, 1985 (#85001219)	224 W. Jefferson Boulevard; 41°40′29″N 86°15′12″W	South Bend	
44	La Salle Street Bridge	La Salle Street Bridge	February 18, 1999 (#99000181)	La Salle St., over the St. Joseph River; 41°40′45″N 86°14′56″W	South Bend	
45	Lakeville High School	Lakeville High School	August 29, 1991 (#91001166)	601 N. Michigan St. 41°31′52″N 86°16′25″W	Lakeville	
46	LaSalle Annex	LaSalle Annex	June 5, 1985 (#85001220)	306 N. Michigan St. 41°40′46″N 86°15′00″W	South Bend	
47	LaSalle Hotel	LaSalle Hotel	June 5, 1985 (#85001221)	237 N. Michigan St. 41°40′44″N 86°15′03″W	South Bend	
48	Chauncey N. Lawton House	Chauncey N. Lawton House	June 23, 1983 (#83000116)	405 W. Wayne St. 41°40′26″N 86°15′18″W	South Bend	
49	Leeper Park	Leeper Park	June 15, 2000 (#00000679)	Roughly bounded by the St. Joseph River, Park Ln., and Bartlett St. 41°41′11″N 86°15′07″W	South Bend	
50	Samuel Leeper Jr. House	Samuel Leeper Jr. House	March 21, 1985 (#85000600)	113 W. North Shore Dr. 41°41′20″N 86°15′05″W	South Bend	
51	Lowell Heights-Olivet African Methodist Episcopal Church		March 6, 2023 (#100008665)	719 North Notre Dame Ave. 41°41′05″N 86°14′16″W	South Bend	
52	Marquette School	Marquette School	September 18, 2013 (#13000726)	1905 College Ave. 41°42′07″N 86°16′38″W	South Bend	
53	Charles McCormick Building	Charles McCormick Building	February 25, 1999 (#99000178)	526-532 E. Colfax Ave. 41°40′39″N 86°14′35″W	South Bend	
54	Merrifield-Cass House	Merrifield-Cass House	June 16, 1983 (#83000147)	816 E. Lincolnway; 41°39′42″N 86°10′09″W	Mishawaka	
55	Mishawaka Carnegie Library	Mishawaka Carnegie Library	August 14, 1998 (#98001048)	122 North Hill; 41°39′42″N 86°11′04″W	Mishawaka	
56	Mishawaka Fire Station No. 4		September 18, 2017 (#100001614)	2319 Lincolnway E. 41°39′47″N 86°08′28″W	Mishawaka	
57	Mishawaka Reservoir Caretaker's Residence	Mishawaka Reservoir Caretaker's Residence	August 14, 1998 (#98001053)	16581 Chandler Boulevard, south of Mishawaka; 41°38′19″N 86°11′04″W	Penn Township	
58	Morey House	Morey House	June 5, 1985 (#85001222)	110-112 Franklin Pl. 41°40′33″N 86°15′17″W	South Bend	
59	Morey-Lampert House	Morey-Lampert House	June 5, 1985 (#85001223)	322 W. Washington St. 41°40′34″N 86°15′17″W	South Bend	
60	Muessel-Drewry's Brewery	Muessel-Drewry's Brewery	December 28, 2000 (#00001543)	1408 Elwood Ave. 41°41′37″N 86°16′16″W	South Bend	
61	New Carlisle Historic District	New Carlisle Historic District	December 14, 1992 (#92001653)	Roughly bounded by Front, Arch, Chestnut, and Bray Sts. 41°42′22″N 86°30′37″W	New Carlisle	
62	Normain Heights Historic District	Normain Heights Historic District	March 20, 2002 (#02000203)	Roughly 2300-2900 N. Main, 2300-2800 Normandy, and the 100-200 blocks of E. Ardennes, Palau, Bastogne, Leyte, Saint Lo, and Guam; 41°41′03″N 86°10′47″W	Mishawaka	
63	North Liberty Historic District	North Liberty Historic District	March 26, 2014 (#14000077)	State Road 23 between Center and Harrison Sts. 41°32′07″N 86°25′37″W	North Liberty	
64	North Liberty Park	North Liberty Park	March 29, 2007 (#07000211)	309 N. Jefferson St. 41°32′16″N 86°25′45″W	North Liberty	
65	North Pumping Station	North Pumping Station	January 2, 1997 (#96001538)	830 N. Michigan St. 41°41′10″N 86°15′00″W	South Bend	
66	Northside Boulevard Riverwall	Northside Boulevard Riverwall	September 27, 2006 (#06000877)	600-1100 Northside Boulevard; 41°40′07″N 86°14′20″W	South Bend	
67	O'Brien Electric Priming Company	O'Brien Electric Priming Company	December 28, 1983 (#83003756)	2001 W. Washington St. 41°40′38″N 86°16′41″W	South Bend	
68	Old Courthouse (Second St. Joseph County Courthouse)	Old Courthouse (Second St. Joseph County Courthouse)	September 4, 1970 (#70000007)	112 S. Lafayette Boulevard; 41°38′58″N 86°15′00″W	South Bend	
69	Joseph D. Oliver House	Joseph D. Oliver House	August 28, 1973 (#73000043)	808 W. Washington Ave. 41°40′33″N 86°15′44″W	South Bend	
70	Palace Theater	Palace Theater	June 5, 1985 (#85001226)	211 N. Michigan St. 41°40′42″N 86°15′03″W	South Bend	
71	Palais Royale Building	Palais Royale Building	July 21, 1983 (#83000102)	113-105 W. Colfax Ave. and 201-209 N. Michigan St. 41°40′40″N 86°15′03″W	South Bend	
72	St. Adalbert Church Complex		May 19, 2025 (#100011864)	2505 W. Grace St. 41°40′10″N 86°17′02″W	South Bend	
73	St. Casimir Parish Historic District	St. Casimir Parish Historic District	January 16, 1997 (#96001543)	Roughly bounded by Arnold and W. Sample Sts. and the former Conrail tracks 41°40′01″N 86°16′16″W	South Bend	
74	St. Joseph County Infirmary	St. Joseph County Infirmary	June 15, 2000 (#00000670)	3016 Portage Ave. 41°43′07″N 86°16′56″W	South Bend	
75	St. Joseph School	St. Joseph School	February 18, 1999 (#99000179)	210 N. Hill St. 41°40′41″N 86°14′33″W	South Bend	
76	St. Joseph's Parish Square		June 7, 2022 (#100007740)	Bounded by West 3rd, West 4th, South Mill, and South Spring Sts. 41°39′35″N 86°10′57″W	Mishawaka	
77	St. Patrick's Farm	St. Patrick's Farm	December 31, 2013 (#13001015)	50651 Laurel Rd., north of South Bend; 41°45′29″N 86°16′03″W	Clay Township	
78	Second St. Joseph Hotel	Second St. Joseph Hotel	June 5, 1985 (#85001227)	117-119 W. Colfax Ave. 41°40′40″N 86°15′05″W	South Bend	
79	Jeremiah H. Service House	Jeremiah H. Service House	March 15, 2000 (#00000216)	302 E. Michigan St. 41°42′22″N 86°30′18″W	New Carlisle	
80	Singer Manufacturing-South Bend Lathe Co. Historic District	Singer Manufacturing-South Bend Lathe Co. Historic District	February 18, 1999 (#99000174)	Madison St. between N. Niles Ave. and the St. Joseph River; 41°40′56″N 86°14′46″W	South Bend	
81	Sommerer House	Sommerer House	February 18, 1999 (#99000172)	415 Parry St. 41°40′20″N 86°14′09″W	South Bend	
82	Sons of Israel Synagogue	Sons of Israel Synagogue	June 25, 2013 (#13000427)	420 S. William St. 41°40′17″N 86°15′21″W	South Bend	
83	South Bend Brewing Association	South Bend Brewing Association	September 16, 2001 (#01000987)	1636 W. Lincolnway; 41°41′08″N 86°16′32″W	South Bend	
84	South Bend City Cemetery	South Bend City Cemetery	December 4, 2018 (#100003189)	214 N. Elm St. 41°40′41″N 86°16′04″W	South Bend	
85	South Bend Remedy Company	South Bend Remedy Company	June 5, 1985 (#85001228)	220 W. LaSalle; 41°40′44″N 86°15′12″W	South Bend	Moved to 501 W. Colfax Ave. in 1988, and then to 402 W. Washington St. in 2003.
86	South Bend Remedy Company Building	South Bend Remedy Company Building	September 16, 2001 (#01000993)	501 W. Colfax Ave. 41°40′41″N 86°15′24″W	South Bend	Moved to 402 W. Washington St. in 2003.
87	South Michigan Street Historic District	South Michigan Street Historic District	December 15, 1997 (#97001556)	Roughly along the junction of Monroe and Michigan Sts. 41°40′15″N 86°15′02″W	South Bend	
88	Stephenson Underwear Mill	Stephenson Underwear Mill	September 28, 1995 (#95000197)	322 E. Colfax Ave. 41°40′39″N 86°14′44″W	South Bend	
89	Studebaker Clubhouse and Tree Sign	Studebaker Clubhouse and Tree Sign	September 18, 1985 (#85002430)	32132 State Road 2, south of New Carlisle; 41°40′08″N 86°29′25″W	Olive Township	Located in Bendix Woods County Park
90	Summers-Longley House-Building	Summers-Longley House-Building	June 5, 1985 (#85001229)	312-314 W. Colfax Ave. 41°40′39″N 86°15′15″W	South Bend	
91	Taylor's Field Historic District		January 16, 2026 (#100012558)	Between Monroe Street on the north, Bronson Street on the south, Saint Joseph Street on the west, and Clinton Street on the east 41°40′10″N 86°14′45″W	South Bend	
92	Third St. Joseph County Courthouse	Third St. Joseph County Courthouse	June 5, 1985 (#85001230)	105 S. Main St. 41°40′33″N 86°15′08″W	South Bend	
93	Tippecanoe Place	Tippecanoe Place	July 2, 1973 (#73000044)	620 W. Washington Ave. 41°40′33″N 86°15′34″W	South Bend	
94	Tower Building	Tower Building	June 5, 1985 (#85001244)	216 W. Washington; 41°40′34″N 86°15′10″W	South Bend	
95	University of Notre Dame: Main and South Quadrangles	University of Notre Dame: Main and South Quadrangles	May 23, 1978 (#78000053)	Off Interstates 80/90; 41°42′07″N 86°14′26″W	Portage Township	Includes the University's historic center, comprising the Basilica, the Golden Dome, and Washington Hall, was built in the early years of the University.
96	Walker Field Shelterhouse	Walker Field Shelterhouse	September 27, 2006 (#06000876)	1305 Ewing Ave. 41°39′02″N 86°16′10″W	South Bend	
97	Walkerton Historic District		November 17, 2021 (#100007175)	Roughly bounded by Michigan, Indiana and Van Buren Sts., Nickle Plate RR. 41°27′57″N 86°28′58″W	Walkerton	
98	Water Street/Darden Road Bridge	Water Street/Darden Road Bridge	March 21, 1985 (#85000599)	Over the St. Joseph River at Darden Rd. 41°43′49″N 86°16′07″W	South Bend	
99	Martin Wenger Farmhouse	Martin Wenger Farmhouse	June 22, 2000 (#00000715)	701 E. Pennsylvania; 41°39′41″N 86°14′27″W	South Bend	
100	Wertz-Bestle Farm	Wertz-Bestle Farm	April 12, 2001 (#01000356)	51387 Portage Rd., north of South Bend; 41°44′46″N 86°18′00″W	German Township	
101	West LaSalle Avenue Historic District	West LaSalle Avenue Historic District	September 18, 2013 (#13000727)	W. LaSalle Ave. between William St. and Martin Luther King Dr. 41°40′45″N 86°15′34″W	South Bend	
102	West Washington Historic District	West Washington Historic District	January 17, 1975 (#75000049)	Irregular pattern roughly bounded by Main St., Western Ave., W. LaSalle Ave., and McPherson St. 41°40′32″N 86°15′30″W	South Bend	

== Former listings ==
	Name on the Register	Image	Date listed	Date removed	Location	City or town	Description
1	Colfax Theater		June 5, 1985 (#85001208)	July 7, 1993	213 W. Colfax Ave. 41°40′39″N 86°15′08″W	South Bend	Demolished in November, 1991.
2	Morningside Club Residence		June 5, 1985 (#85001224)	January 24, 1989	413 W. Colfax	South Bend	Destroyed by fire on December 18, 1988
3	Northern Indiana Gas and Electric Company Building		June 5, 1985 (#85001225)	October 9, 2012	221 N. Michigan St. 41°40′43″N 86°15′02″W	South Bend	
4	Tivoli Theater		April 1, 1998 (#98000304)	March 24, 2005	208 N. Main St.	Mishawaka	Demolished on February 2, 2005

== See also ==
- List of National Historic Landmarks in Indiana
- National Register of Historic Places listings in Indiana
- Listings in neighboring counties: Berrien (MI), Cass (MI), Elkhart, LaPorte, Marshall, Starke
- List of Indiana state historical markers in St. Joseph County
