= Wenger (disambiguation) =

Wenger is a Swiss Army knife manufacturer.

Wenger may also refer to:

- Wenger (surname), a surname of German origin
- Wenger, California, a ghost town in Mariposa County, California
- Stade Arsène Wenger, a French football stadium
- Martin Wenger House, an historic home in St. Joseph County, Indiana
- Wenger Church, or Groffdale Conference Mennonite Church
- Wenger Mennonite, or Wengerite, an Old Order Mennonites denomination
- Wenger Corp., part of LARES, an electronic sound enhancement system
