= Bendix Woods =

Park in Olive Township, St. Joseph County, Indiana

Bendix Woods County Park
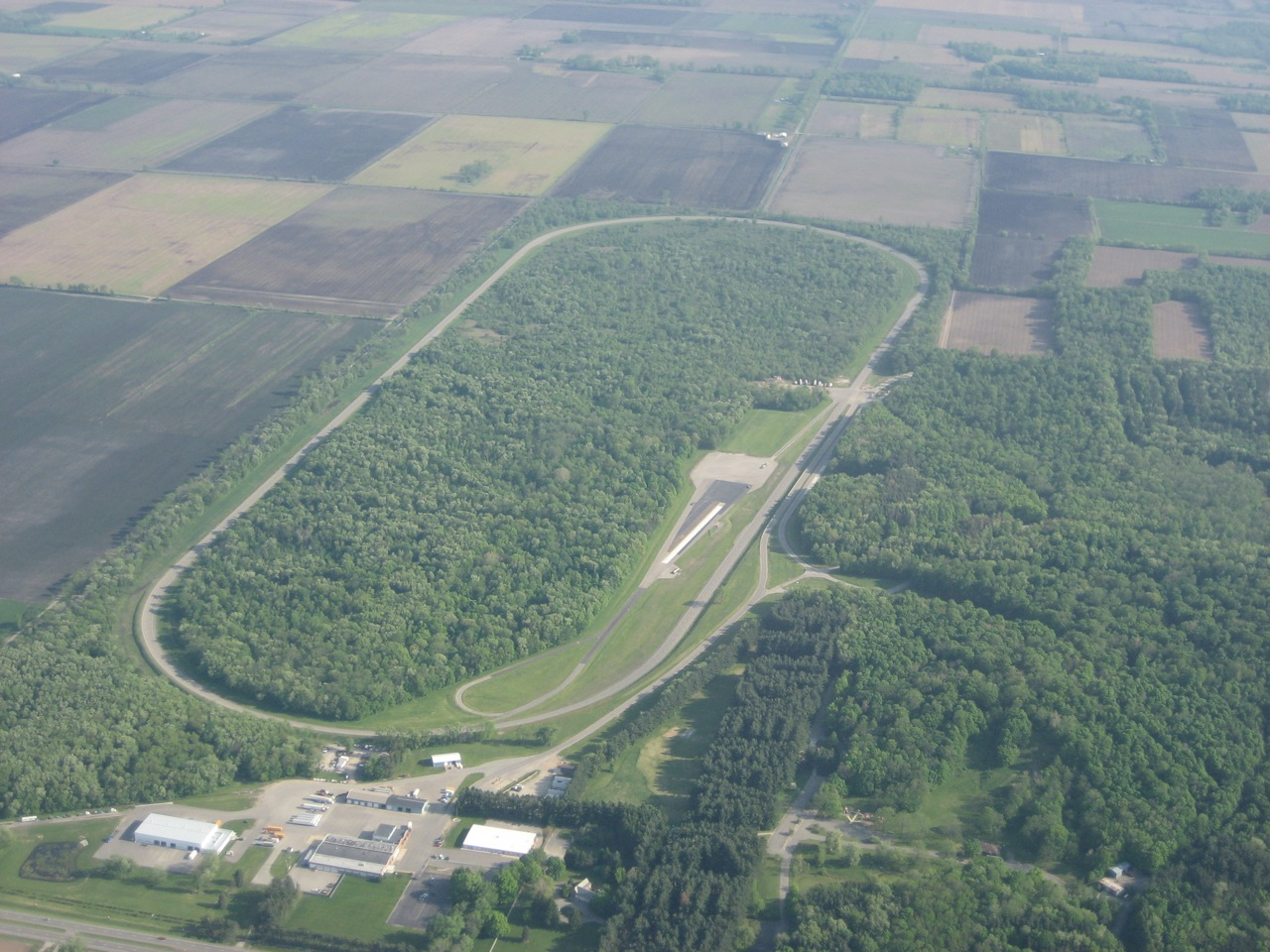
- Aerial photo of the track
- Interactive map of Bendix Woods County Park
- Type: County park
- Location: Olive Township, St. Joseph County, Indiana
- Coordinates: 41°40′11″N 86°29′18″W
- Area: 195 acres (0.79 km^{2})
- Operator: St. Joseph County Parks and Recreation Department
- Open: All year; Closed Thanksgiving Day and Christmas Day
- Studebaker Clubhouse and Tree Sign
- U.S. National Register of Historic Places
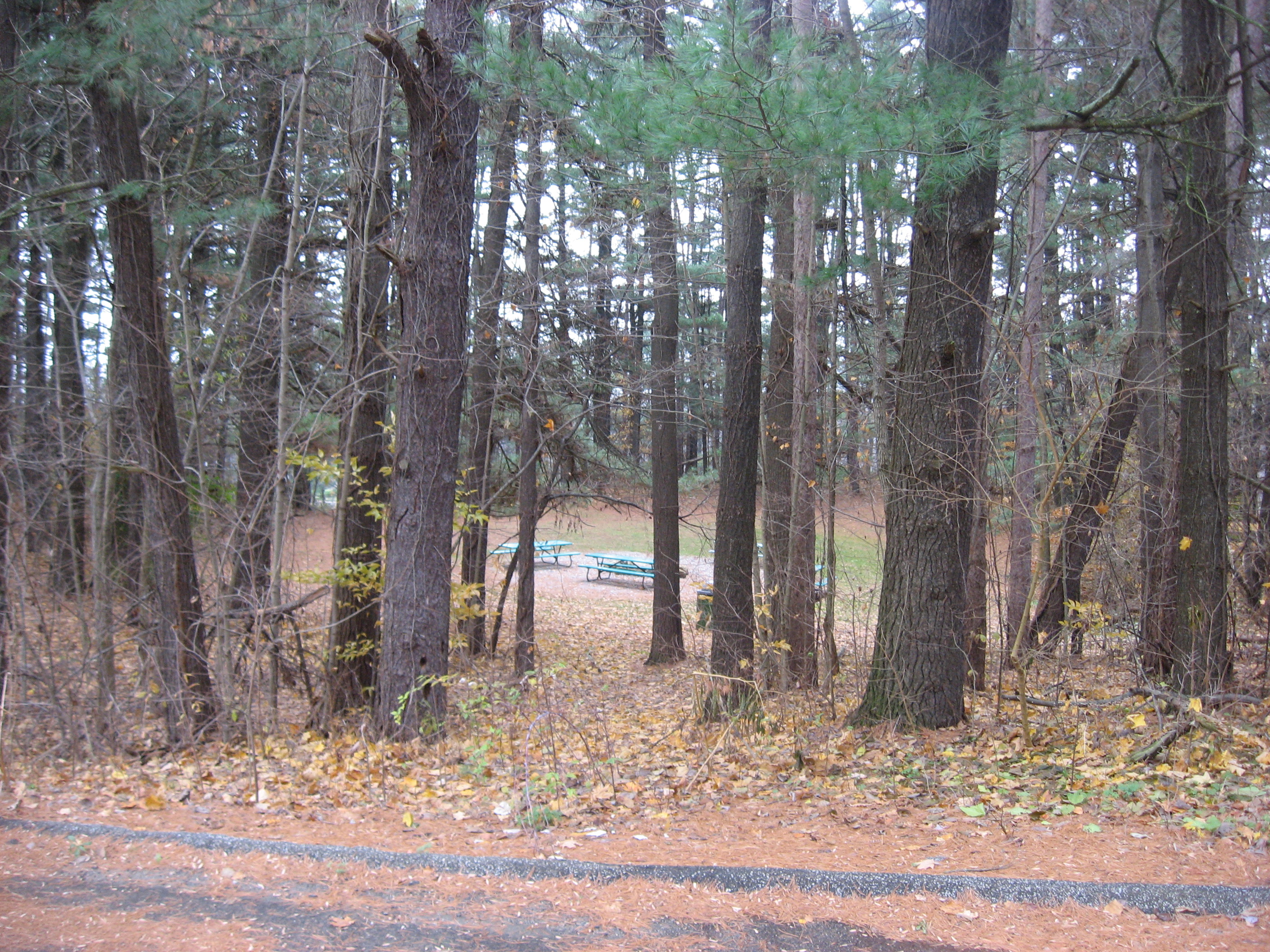
- Studebaker "D" in Bendix Woods Park, November 2013

- Location within Indiana Location within the United States
- Location: 32132 State Road 2, south of New Carlisle, Olive Township, St. Joseph County, Indiana
- Area: 21.1 acres (8.5 ha)
- Built: 1926, 1938
- Architect: Young, Ernest W.
- Architectural style: Colonial Revival
- NRHP reference No.: 85002430
- Added to NRHP: September 18, 1985

Bendix Woods County Park is a park in Olive Township, St. Joseph County, Indiana, located south of New Carlisle. It is managed by the St. Joseph County Parks and Recreation Department.

== History ==
The name Bendix Woods originates from the Bendix Corporation which donated the land to St. Joseph County for the creation of a park. The park's historical significance, however, dates to its establishment by the Studebaker Corporation, formerly of nearby South Bend, Indiana, as the first model test facility for an American automobile company.

Studebaker developed the 840 acres (3.4 km^{2}) of land in 1926 as the first-ever controlled automotive-testing grounds for its product lines, beating Packard, Studebaker's future business partner, by one year. Studebaker heavily promoted the grounds as a "million-dollar outdoor testing laboratory" in advertisements. The test track that ran through the grounds simulated a variety of terrains and road conditions. Studebaker landscaped the park by keeping natural features—and planted a huge grove of trees which spell out "STUDEBAKER" when viewed from above.

Following the collapse of Studebaker's U.S. production facilities in 1963, the land was acquired by Bendix Corporation which used the grounds for corporate purposes. In 1996 Bosch purchased the property; in 2015 Navistar acquired it from Bosch and renamed it "Navistar Proving Grounds".

The park was also home to a toboggan roller-coaster that was never opened after its owners were thrown off when making a trial run.

== Studebaker Clubhouse ==
The Studebaker Clubhouse is a historic clubhouse. It was built in 1926, and is a two-story, U-shaped, Colonial Revival style brick building. The front facade features a one-story frame porch supported by Tuscan order columns. The building was remodeled in 1947, 1961, and 1966–1967. It was built as a place for the approximately 100 proving ground employees to eat, relax in off hours, stay in bad weather, and board if they so desired. It currently houses the park's Nature Center and offices.

It was listed on the National Register of Historic Places in 1985 along with the Tree Sign.

== Tree sign ==
In 1938 the company planted 8,000 pine trees in a pattern that, viewed from above, spelled "STUDEBAKER".

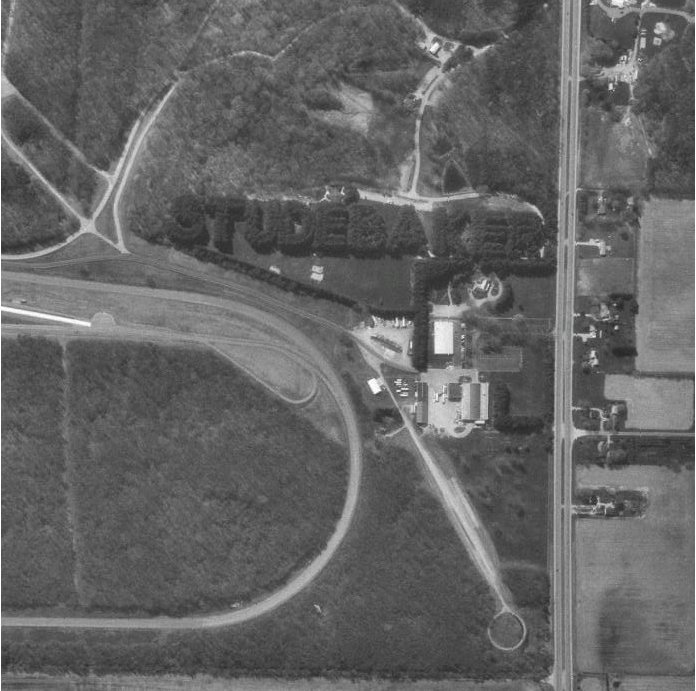
Tree grove spelling Studebaker.

In late December 2004, the "STUDEBAKER" tree planting, recognized as one of the world's largest living advertisements and on the National Register of Historic Places, was severely damaged in a Christmas week ice storm. However, it continues to stand; in 2011 a grant was awarded for its long-term management and preservation, and a management plan was completed in 2012. Dead and diseased trees were removed in 2013 and 2014, and volunteers planted replacement saplings between April 15 and April 19, 2015.
