= Beiger Mansion =

Historic house in Indiana, United States

- Beiger House
- U.S. National Register of Historic Places
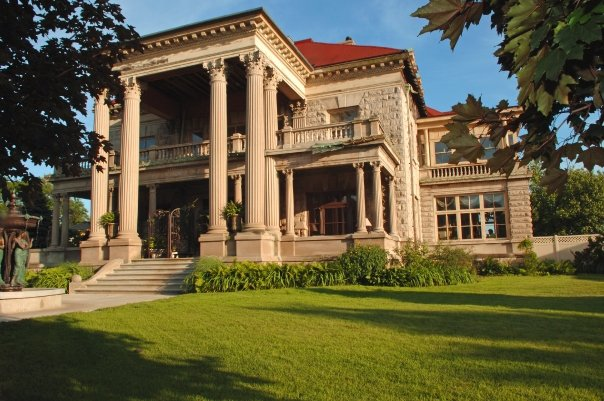
- The Beiger Mansion

- Location within Indiana Location within the United States
- Location: 317 Lincolnway E., Mishawaka, Indiana
- Coordinates: 41°39′40″N 86°10′40″W
- Area: 0.5 acres (0.20 ha)
- Built: 1903
- Architectural style: Classical Revival, Neo-Classical
- NRHP reference No.: 73000042
- Added to NRHP: August 28, 1973

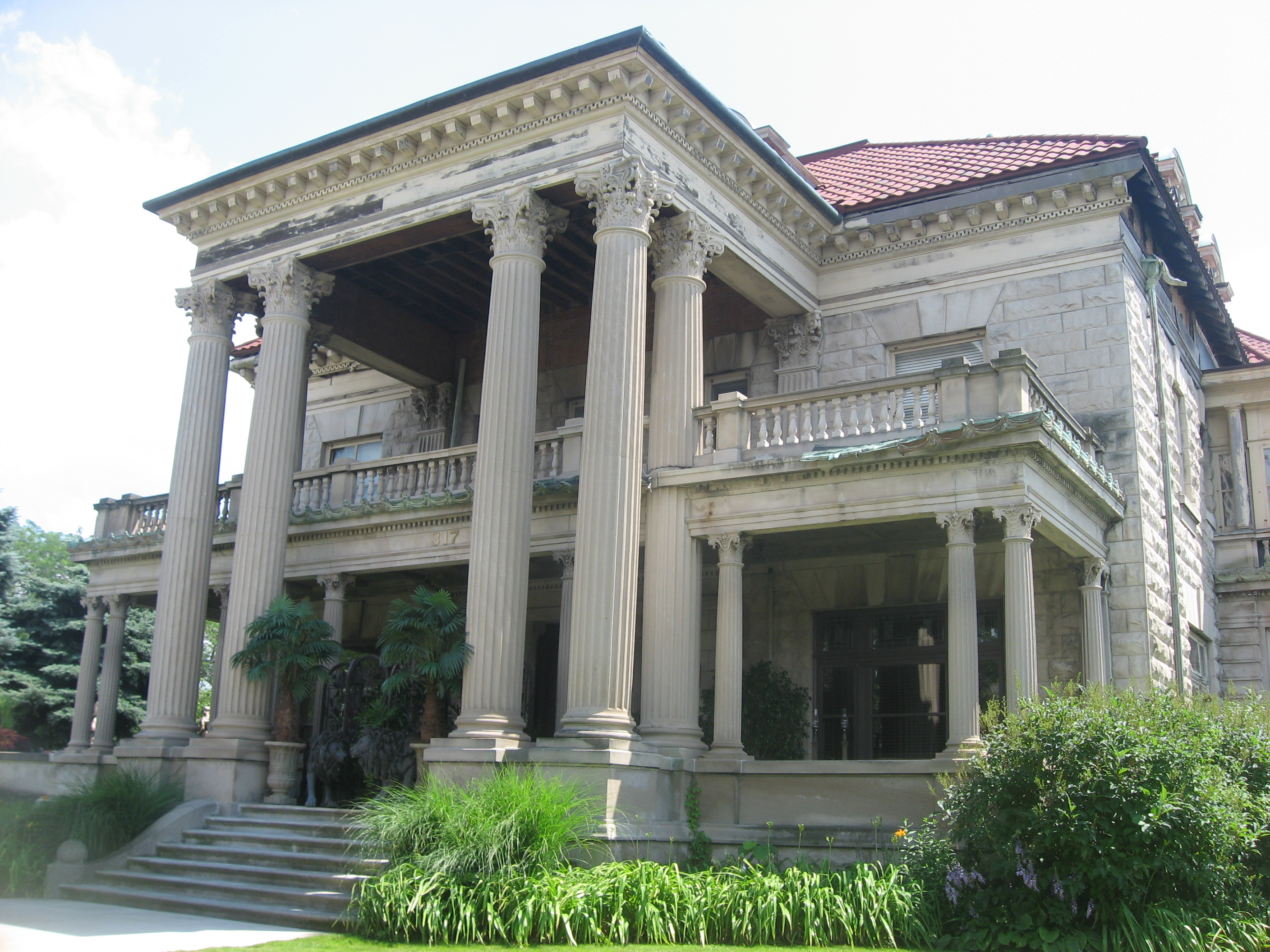
The Beiger Mansion

The Beiger Mansion, pronounced By-gur, though known more colloquially as Bee-gur, was the palatial home of Martin Valentine and Susie Higgins Beiger at 317 Lincoln Way E. in Mishawaka, Indiana. In 1973 it was added to the National Register of Historic Places. Built in 1903 the home was burned to the ground in 1975 and has since been restored, though not to its former grandeur. The restoration process is still ongoing. It is now operated as a bed and breakfast and event facility.

== Background ==
Martin V. Beiger, born February 3, 1847, was Mishawaka's first millionaire. Martin made his fortune with the Mishawaka Woolen and Rubber Manufacturing Company, which would later become Ball Band then Uniroyal. He, along with his father Jacob Beiger, bought the small textiles mill in 1867. The mill originally had just 3 workers and mostly made flannels. He married Susie Higgins, the daughter of a local jeweler, in December 1875. In 1886 Martin Beiger, along with Adolphus Eberhart, patented the first all knit wool boot that did not lose shape or size. Demand for this product quickly grew the company. The boots were topped with a black band and, later, a red ball which became the companies trade mark. Ball Band went on to employ 5000 workers by 1923 and as many as 10000 in the 1940s. By 1903 the company had around 2000 employees and Martin had become very wealthy. Soon he and Susie were considering a more lavish home in the style of some of New Port Rhode Island's mansions, particularly that of The Breakers.

== Mansion ==
Planning for a new home was begun in 1900, and construction on the 4 1/2-story neoclassical mansion began in 1903. Architectural plans were designed by Durham and Snyder, a company in South Bend, Indiana, and landscaping plans were designed by prominent landscape architect Jens Jensen. In the first year of construction, on September 26, 1903, Martin Beiger died at the age of 56 after an infection from an operation for appendicitus. Construction on the mansion was halted for a time, however Susie later decided to continue with construction and the mansion was completed in 1908 at a total cost of 100,000 dollars.

The home is 21,790 square feet and originally had some 40 rooms. It has 11 unique fireplaces. Among the original rooms there were 11 bedrooms, 2 dining rooms, 2 kitchens, 2 sitting rooms, a billiards room, a library, a breakfast room, a solarium, a reception room, a ball room, a one-lane bowling alley, a museum, and a music room. The music room featured a three-manual Aeolian organ costing $25,000 at the time (about $700,000 in 2012). The 5th floor is a 2,000-square-foot area that originally housed the gardeners quarters. The mansion originally sat on nearly an entire block, and featured landscaped gardens and a full tennis court, built for her nephew.

The home was very modern for its time. It had electric lighting throughout, an internal bell system for calling the staff, a central vacuum system, and radiator and forced air heating. Originally the home was designed with an elevator in it; however, during construction it was decided to instead use the elevator shaft to increase the size of the safes. With time this would prove to be an important choice. The main safe on the second floor encompasses several hundred square feet of storage. All the safes were provided by the Mosler Safe Company of Cincinnati Ohio. The mansion featured several prized woods including, African mahogany, birds eye maple, and teak. Several of the rooms had large murals hand painted on silk. The first floor dining room had an Italianate scene, the library had a depiction of the birth of Christ from Ben Hur, and the breakfast room had a sunrise motif.

Susie, along with a two nieces and nephew of hers, moved into the mansion in 1908. She lived well, with 6 servants, and entertained lavishly. Susie is reported to have had the first car in Mishawaka. She lived in the home until her death in 1927, when Ms. Beiger fell while walking down the main staircase in the home, breaking her hip. Susie died of complications due to this fall at the age of 68.

=== After the death of Ms. Beiger ===
Since she did not have any children Ms. Beiger left the mansion in trust as a home for the care of elderly women. Ms. Beiger willed 210 thousand dollars of her 1.55 million dollar estate to care for and maintain the home and its furnishings. The home for the care of the elderly was opened February 1, 1930.

The home remained a care facility until its operation was no longer financially viable ceasing operation in 1967. During this time the surrounding grounds, which were originally an entire block, were sold off. To the south of the mansion, and on the original site of the tennis courts, lies the Dodge House for the Elderly which was built in 1933. By the late 1960s the future of the home was uncertain, and in 1972 it was slated for demolition to make way for used car lot. However, the local community along with the Mishawaka Historical Society banded together in order to save and restore the mansion. On September 7, 1973, the home was placed on the National Register of Historic Places.

In the early morning on 20 January 1975, the mansion was burned to the ground in an unsolved arson. The terracotta roof collapsed through into the basement and nearly the entire home was destroyed. All that remained standing were the limestone walls, chimneys, and safes. The bulk of the valuable furniture and artifacts within were lost as well. Disastrously there was only a $75,000 insurance policy on the mansion, leaving its future again unclear. However, again the community moved to save the mansion. The recovery was slow. It took 4 years before a roof was again over the structure. By the mid- to late 1980s, the Historical Society had lost support and finances for preserving and restoring the mansion.

On August 1, 1989, Ron Montandon purchased the mansion from the Historical Society. He has since worked to restore the mansion to its original grandeur. The current floor plan matches the original, and most of the landscaping is based on the original plans. Much of the current interior has been reproduced from pictures and accounts of the original home. In order to finance the restoration process, the mansion is currently operated as a 6-bedroom bed and breakfast and as an event facility known as the Beiger Mansion Inn. In February 2014 The Beiger Mansion Inn won the Mishawaka Business Association award for business of the year for 2013.

== See also ==
- National Register of Historic Places listings in St. Joseph County, Indiana
