= Third St. Joseph County Courthouse =

- U.S. National Register of Historic Places
- U.S. Historic district – Contributing property
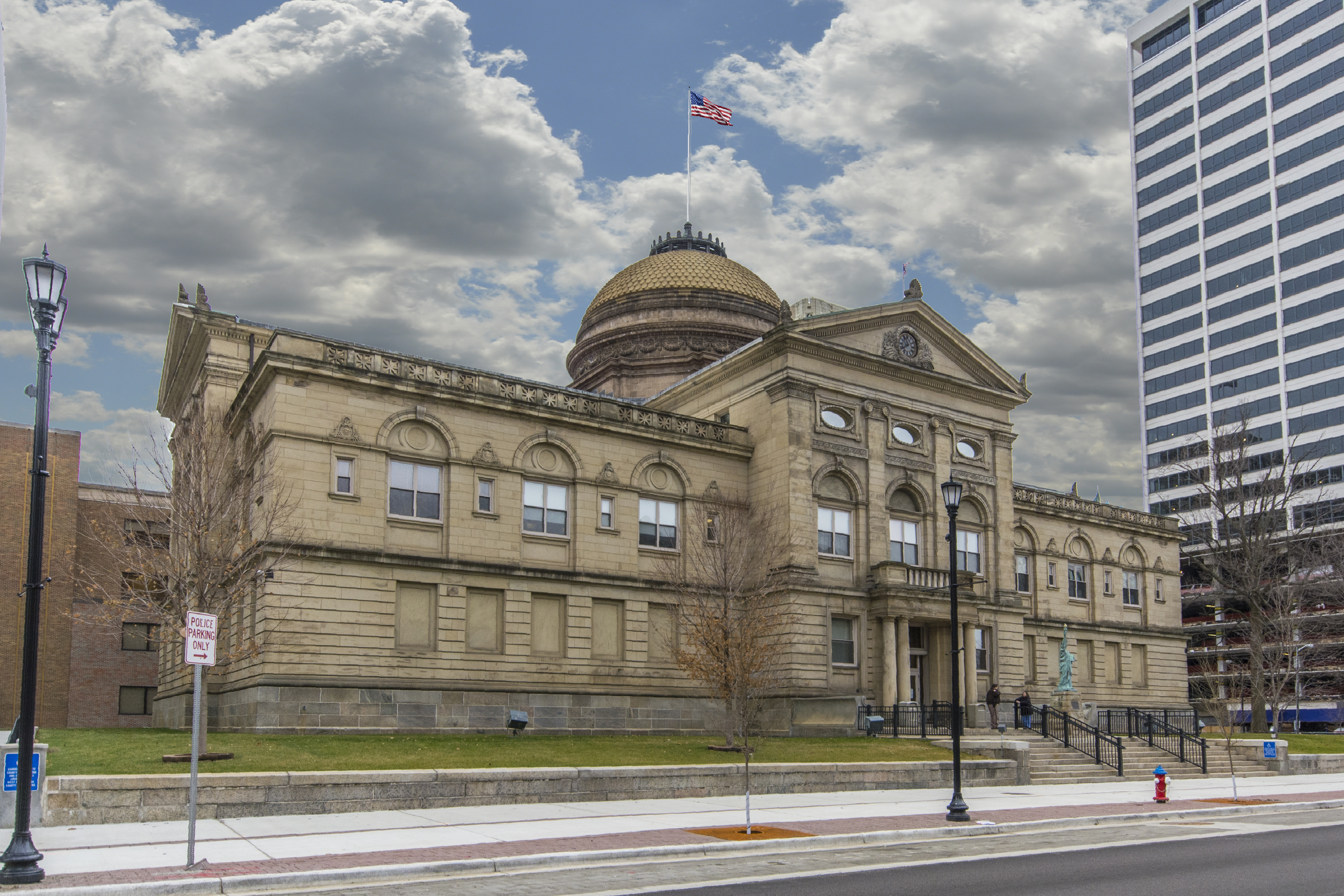
- Third St. Joseph County Courthouse in 2019

- Location within Indiana Location within the United States
- Location: 101 S. Main St., South Bend, Indiana
- Coordinates: 41°40′33″N 86°15′8″W
- Area: 1.3 acres (0.53 ha)
- Built: 1897
- Built by: Stewart, James & Co.
- Architect: Shepley, Rutan & Coolidge
- Architectural style: Classical Revival
- MPS: Downtown South Bend Historic MRA
- NRHP reference No.: 85001230
- Added to NRHP: June 5, 1985

Third St. Joseph County Courthouse is a historic courthouse located at South Bend, Indiana. It was designed by architecture firm Shepley, Rutan and Coolidge and built in 1897. It is a 2 1/2-story, Classical Revival style stone and granite building. It features a large dome at the cross-axis of the gable roof, a paired column portico, and center pavilion and clock in the tympanum of the pediment.

It was listed on the National Register of Historic Places in 1985. It is located in the West Washington Historic District.

== See also ==
- National Register of Historic Places listings in St. Joseph County, Indiana
