= Sommerer House (South Bend, Indiana) =

Historic house in Indiana, United States

- U.S. National Register of Historic Places
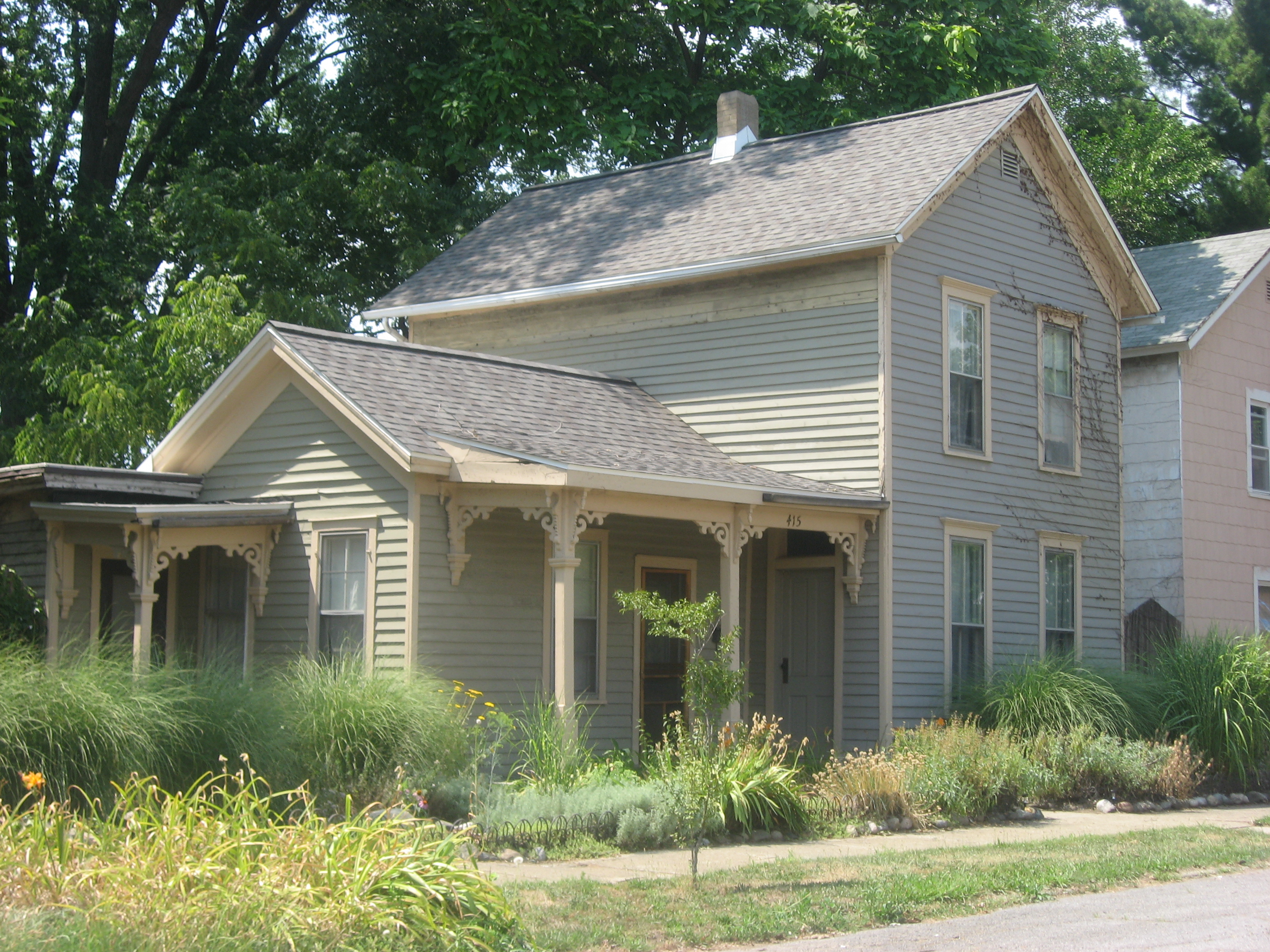
- Sommerer House, July 2012

- Location within Indiana Location within the United States
- Location: 415 Parry St., South Bend, Indiana
- Coordinates: 41°40′19″N 86°14′10″W
- Area: less than one acre
- Built: c. 1875
- Architectural style: Upright and Wing
- MPS: East Bank MPS
- NRHP reference No.: 99000172
- Added to NRHP: February 18, 1999

Sommerer House is a historic home located at South Bend, Indiana. It was built about 1875, and consists of a two-story, rectangular main block with a one-story wing and two-story ell. It is representative of the Upright and Wing vernacular wood-frame house type. It is sheathed in clapboard siding and gable and shed roofs. The house features two ornately decorated porches.

It was listed on the National Register of Historic Places in 1999.
