= West LaSalle Avenue Historic District =

Historic district in Indiana, United States

- U.S. National Register of Historic Places
- U.S. Historic district
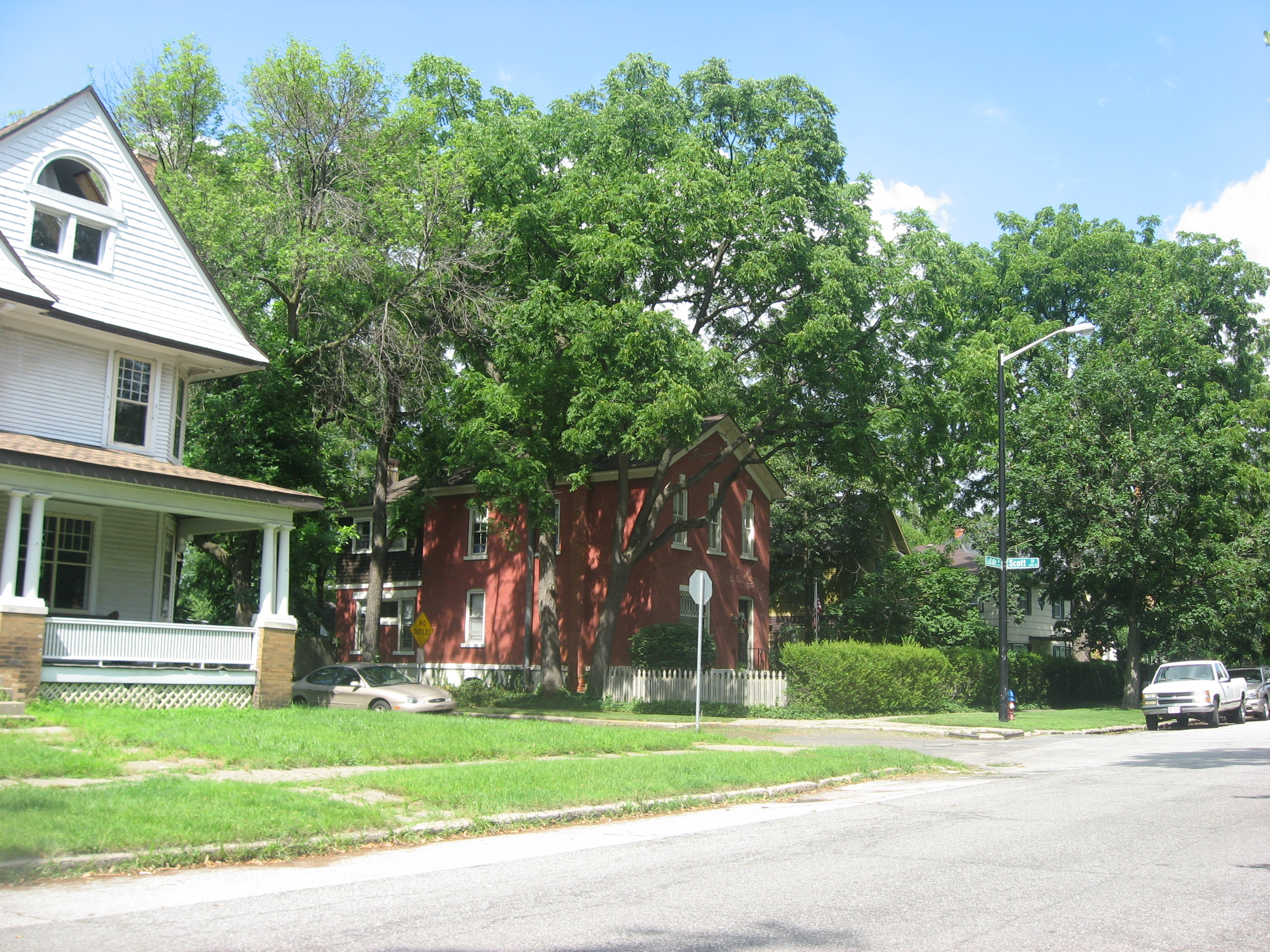
- Scott at LaSalle, July 2013

- Location within Indiana Location within the United States
- Location: W. LaSalle Ave. between William St. and Martin Luther King Dr., South Bend, Indiana
- Coordinates: 41°40′45″N 86°15′34″W
- Area: 4 acres (1.6 ha)
- Architect: Turner, E. Hill; Schutt, R.K.; Freyermuth & Maurer; Ellwood, Willard M.; Woolman Brothers
- Architectural style: Italianate, Queen Anne, Late Gothic Revival, Beaux-Arts
- NRHP reference No.: 13000727
- Added to NRHP: September 18, 2013

West LaSalle Avenue Historic District is a national historic district located at South Bend, Indiana. It encompasses 33 contributing buildings and two contributing structures in a predominantly residential section of South Bend. It developed between about 1870 and 1930, and includes notable examples of Italianate, Queen Anne, Late Gothic Revival, and Beaux-Arts style architecture and works by architects Austin & Shambleau. Notable buildings include the St. Peter's Church (1927), Frank Eby House (1904), Lydia Klinger House (1900), Woodworth House (c. 1890), Woolman House (1880), Goetz House (1892), Studebaker House (c. 1880), Kuppler House (1885), and the Gunderman House (c. 1900).

It was listed on the National Register of Historic Places in 2013.
