= St. Joseph School (South Bend, Indiana) =

- U.S. National Register of Historic Places
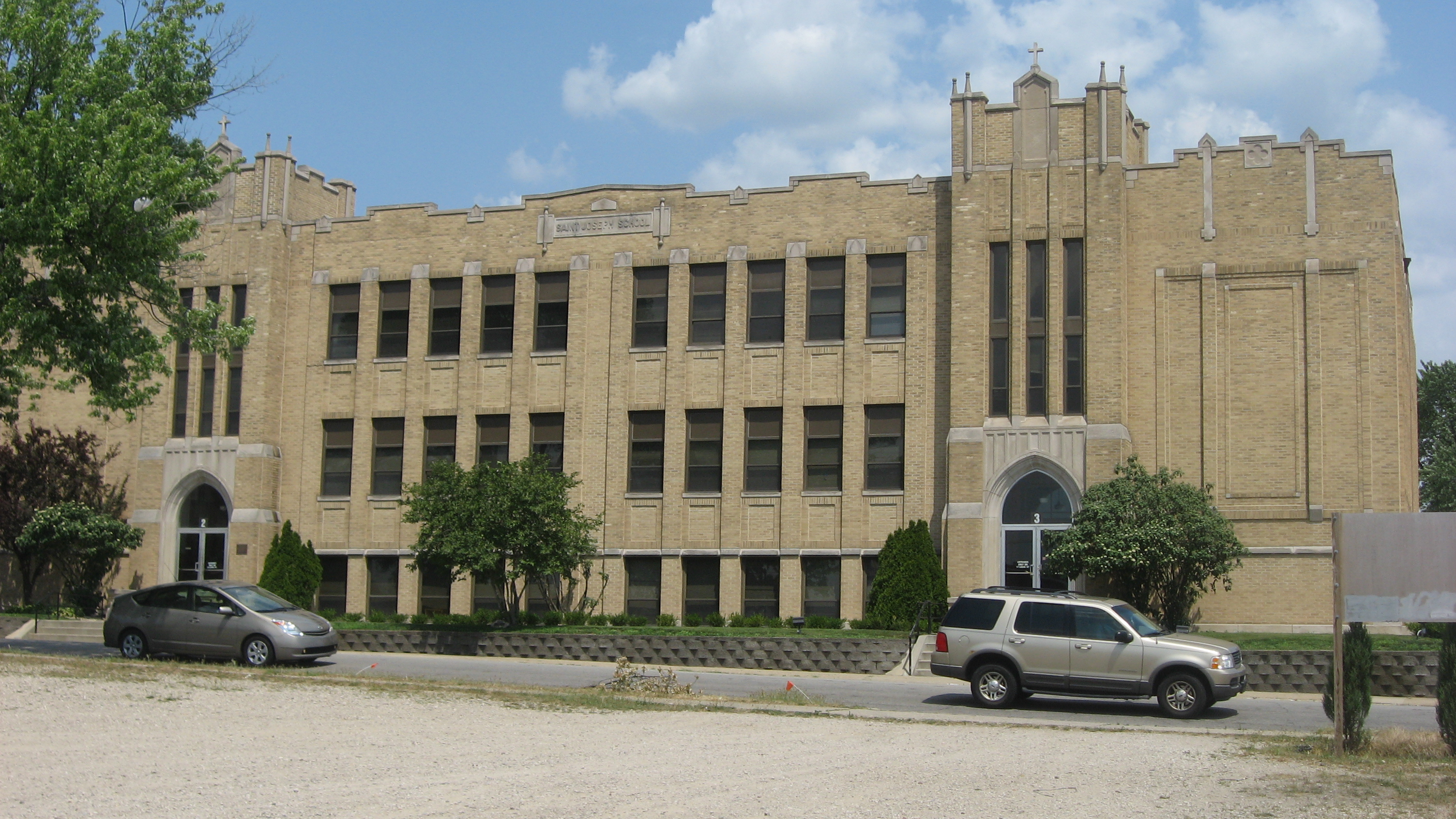
- St. Joseph School, July 2012

- Location within Indiana Location within the United States
- Location: 210 N. Hill St., South Bend, Indiana
- Coordinates: 41°40′41″N 86°14′33″W
- Area: less than one acre
- Built: 1925
- Architect: Freyermuth & Maurer
- Architectural style: Late Gothic Revival
- MPS: East Bank MPS
- NRHP reference No.: 99000179
- Added to NRHP: February 18, 1999

St. Joseph Grade School (SJGS) is a Catholic pre-K through 8 school in South Bend, Indiana, noted in particular for its historic school building, a Late Gothic Revival style tan brick building built in 1925. The school has an enrollment of 471 students, and the principal is Melissa Green.

The Congregation of Holy Cross administers the school. It is the parochial school of the Parish of St. Joseph, in the Diocese of Fort Wayne-South Bend, and the oldest Catholic congregation in the city. It bears the same name as the county and nearby river.

== Architecture ==
The main school building is a 2½-story, "T"-plan building of tan brick on a raised basement built in 1925. It sits on a stone-clad foundation and has decorative brickwork. It features projecting entry bays with recessed gothic arched entries and a parapet with stone detailing.

It was listed on the National Register of Historic Places in 1999, one of 95 other districts, properties, and landmarks in the county.
