= Stephenson Underwear Mill =

- U.S. National Register of Historic Places
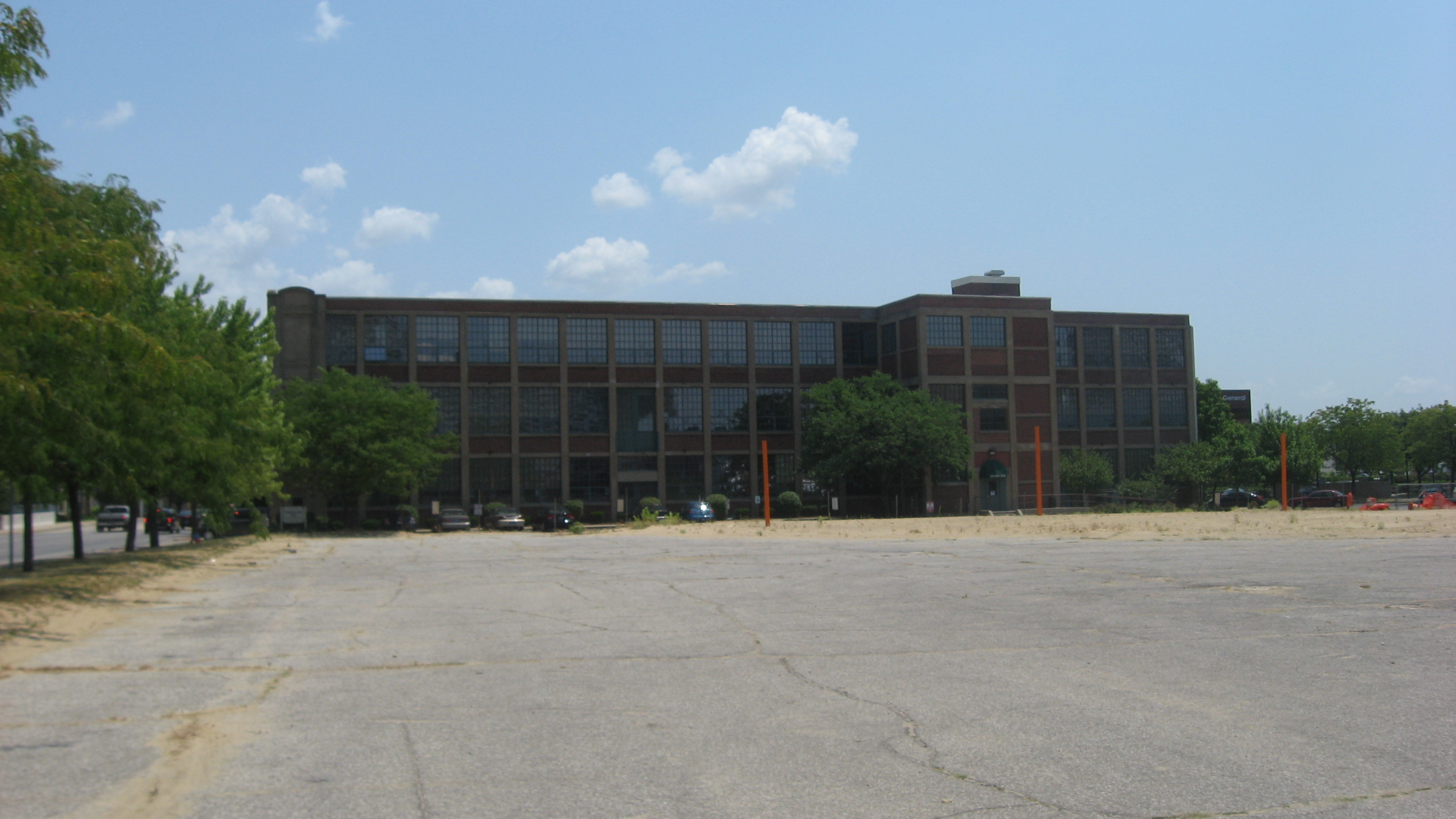
- Stephenson Underwear Mill, July 2012

- Location within Indiana Location within the United States
- Location: 322 E. Colfax Ave., South Bend, Indiana
- Coordinates: 41°40′39″N 86°14′55″W
- Area: less than one acre
- Built: 1916
- NRHP reference No.: 95000197
- Added to NRHP: September 28, 1995

Stephenson Underwear Mill is a historic textile mill located at South Bend, Indiana. It was built in 1916, and is a three-story, rectangular, nine-bay reinforced concrete building with brick curtain walls. It features a parapet with concrete coping and concrete panels on each side of the front panels. The building was rehabilitated for use as apartments in the early-1990s.

It was listed on the National Register of Historic Places in 1995.
