= Samuel Leeper Jr. House =

Historic house in Indiana, United States

- U.S. National Register of Historic Places
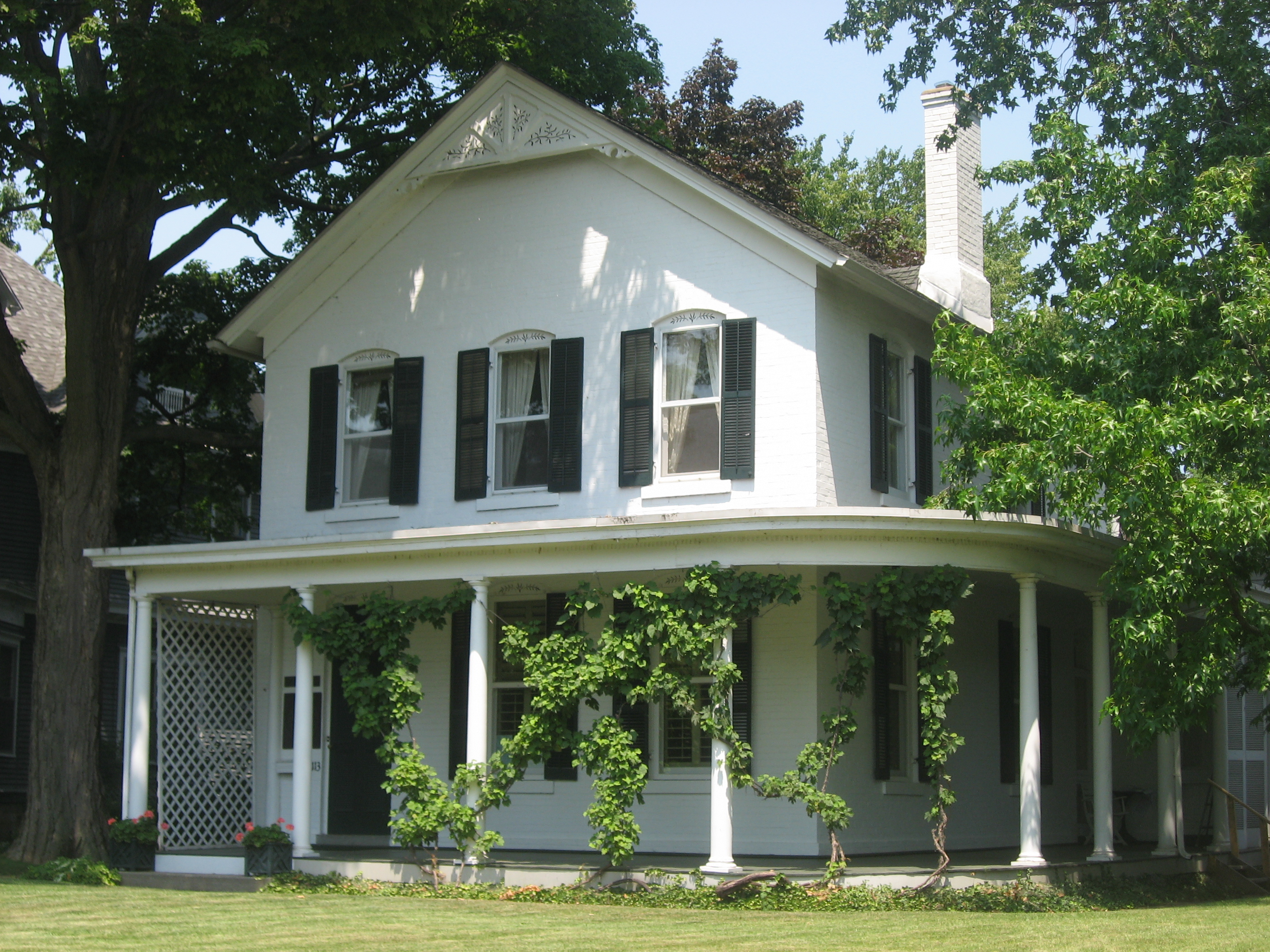
- Samuel Leeper Jr. House, July 2012

- Location within Indiana Location within the United States
- Location: 113 W. North Shore Dr., South Bend, Indiana
- Coordinates: 41°41′20″N 86°15′3″W
- Area: less than one acre
- Built: 1888
- Built by: Leeper, Samuel, Jr.
- NRHP reference No.: 85000600
- Added to NRHP: March 21, 1985

Samuel Leeper Jr. House, also known as the Leeper-Kline House, is a historic home located at South Bend, Indiana. It was built in 1888, and is a two-story, vernacular brick dwelling with rear additions. It has a gable roof and features a wraparound porch supported by nine round Doric order columns.

It was listed on the National Register of Historic Places in 1985.
