= North Liberty Park =

- U.S. National Register of Historic Places
- U.S. Historic district
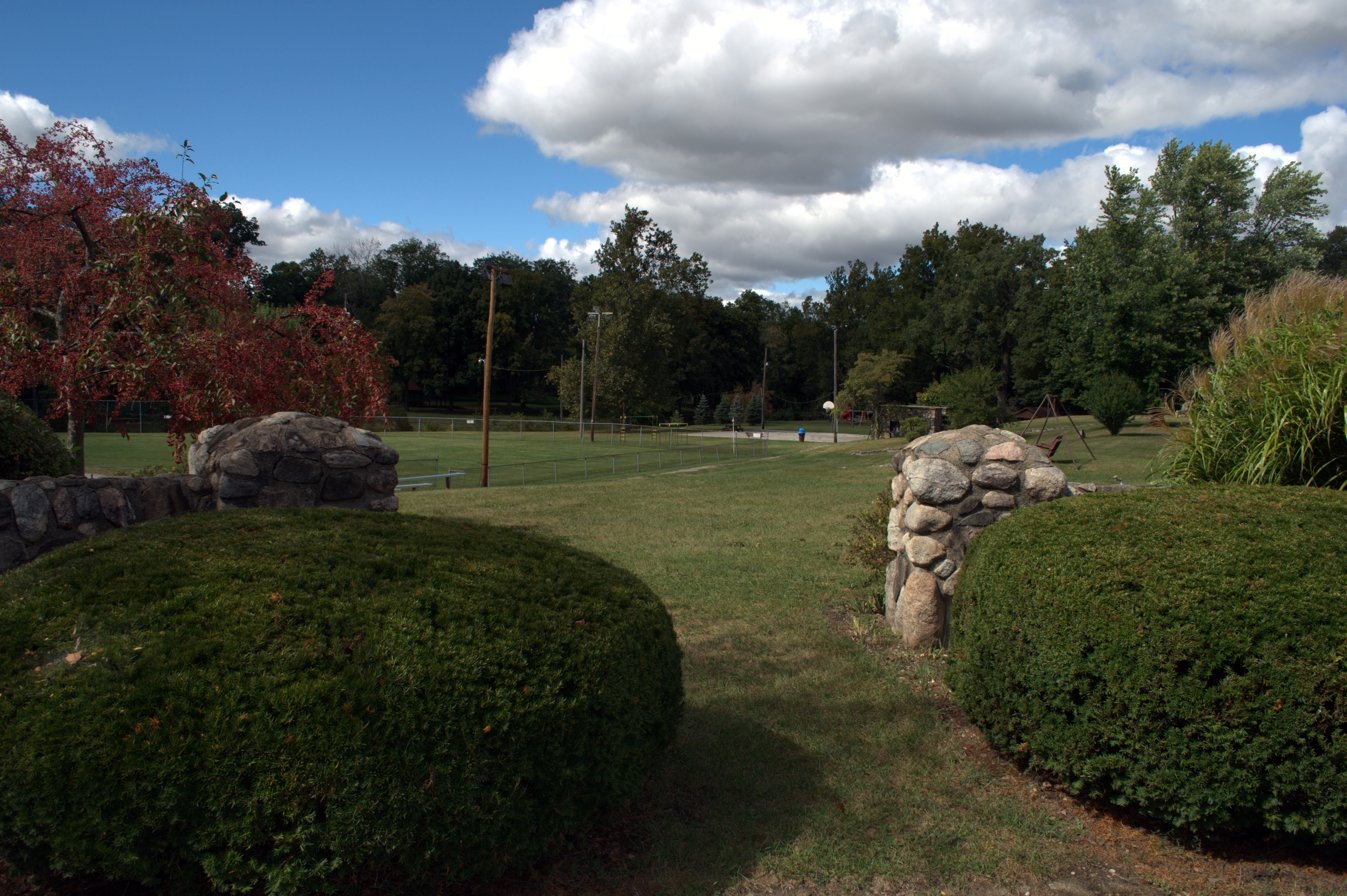
- Main Entrance to North Liberty park, September 2013

- Location within Indiana Location within the United States
- Location: 309 N. Jefferson St., North Liberty, Indiana
- Coordinates: 41°32′16″N 86°25′45″W
- Area: 7 acres (2.8 ha)
- Built: 1935, 1937
- Architect: Works Progress Administration
- MPS: New Deal Resources in Indiana State Parks MPS
- NRHP reference No.: 07000211
- Added to NRHP: March 29, 2007

North Liberty Park, also known as North Liberty Community Park, is a historic public park and national historic district located at North Liberty, Indiana. The district encompasses two contributing buildings, one contributing site, three contributing structures, and two contributing objects in a public park. It was developed by the Works Progress Administration in 1935 and 1937. They constructed the ornamental fieldstone entrance structures, a footbridge, bandshell, tool shed, bath house, and other fieldstone features.

It was listed on the National Register of Historic Places in 2007.
