= Children's Dispensary =

- U.S. National Register of Historic Places
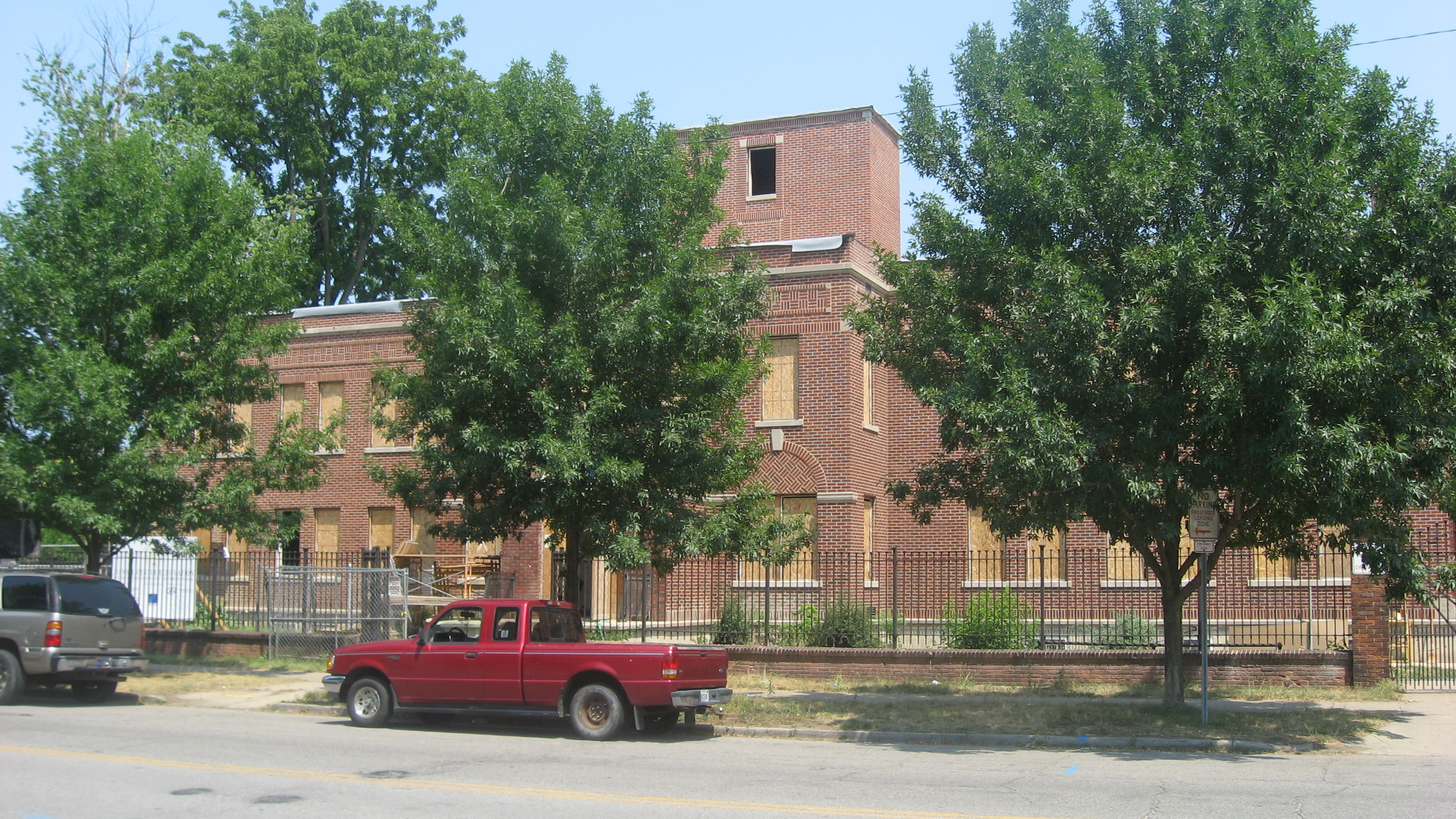
- Children's Dispensary, July 2012

- Location within Indiana
- Location: 1045 W. Washington, South Bend, Indiana
- Coordinates: 41°40′35″N 86°15′58″W
- Area: less than one acre
- Built: c. 1910, 1925
- Architect: Ellwood, Willard M.
- Architectural style: Late 19th And 20th Century Revivals, Classical Revival
- NRHP reference No.: 97001541
- Added to NRHP: December 24, 1997

Children's Dispensary, also known as Hansel Center, is a historic hospital building located at South Bend, Indiana. The main building was built in 1925, and is a two-story, "T"-plan, Classical Revival style brick building with limestone trim. Also on the property are the contributing garage and surrounding wall dated to the 1910s. The dispensary provided a comprehensive program of general medical care to disadvantaged children. The building was renovated in 2012 to house the Notre Dame Center for Arts and Culture.

It was listed on the National Register of Historic Places in 1997.
