= W.R. Hinkle and Co. =

- U.S. National Register of Historic Places
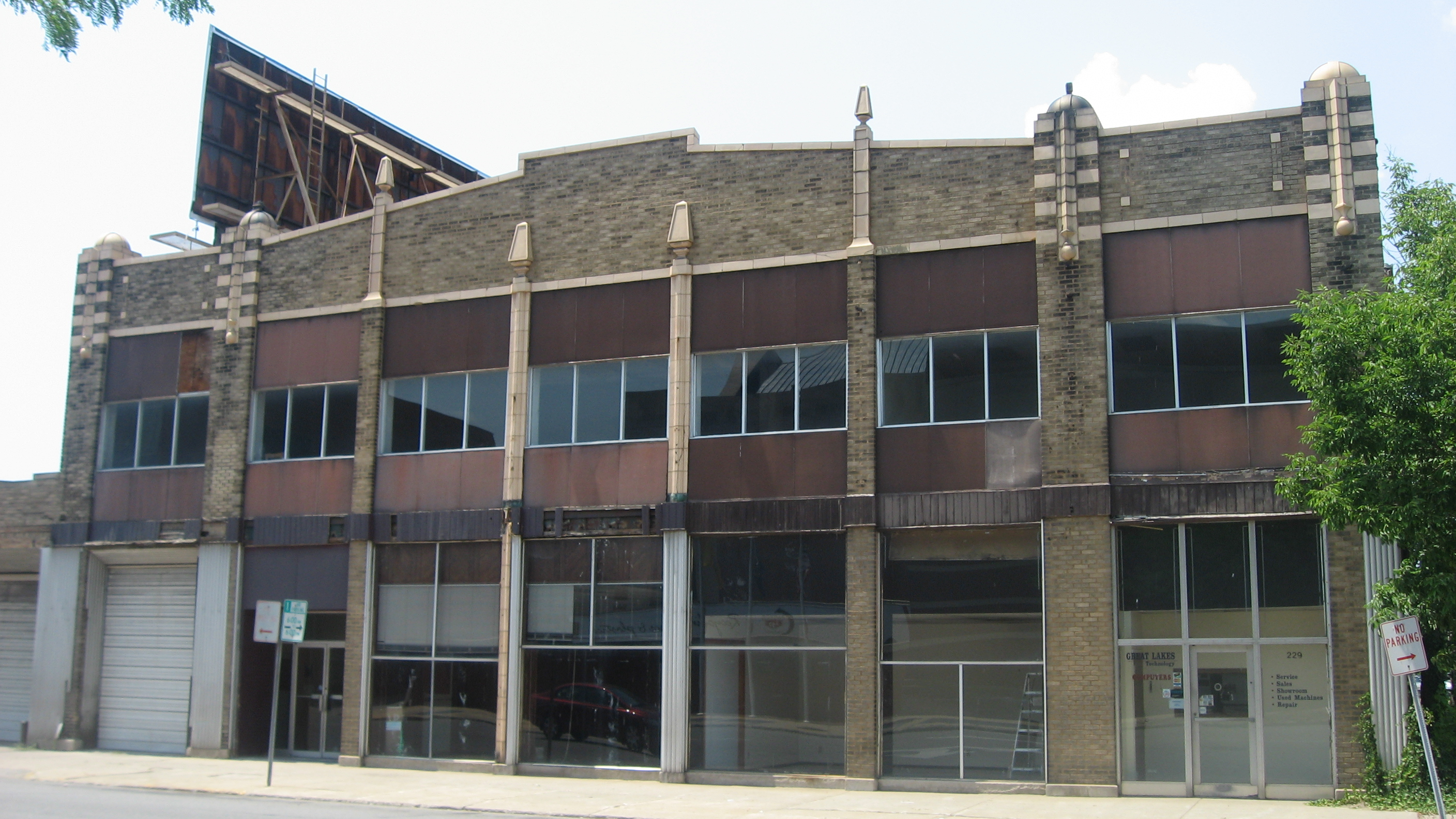
- W.R. Hinkle and Company, July 2012

- Location within Indiana Location within the United States
- Location: 225 N. Lafayette, South Bend, Indiana
- Coordinates: 41°40′43″N 86°15′14″W
- Area: less than one acre
- Built: 1922
- Architect: Dunbar, Noah
- MPS: Downtown South Bend Historic MRA
- NRHP reference No.: 85001213
- Added to NRHP: June 5, 1985

W.R. Hinkle and Co. is a historic automobile showroom located at South Bend, Indiana. It was built in 1922, and is a two-story, rectangular, yellow brick building with terra cotta trim. It is seven bays wide and has a one-story addition. It features narrow terra cotta piers that extend into pointed finials. The building and its owner were featured in the September 23, 1946 edition of Life Magazine.

It was listed on the National Register of Historic Places in 1985.
