= Summers–Longley Building =

- U.S. National Register of Historic Places
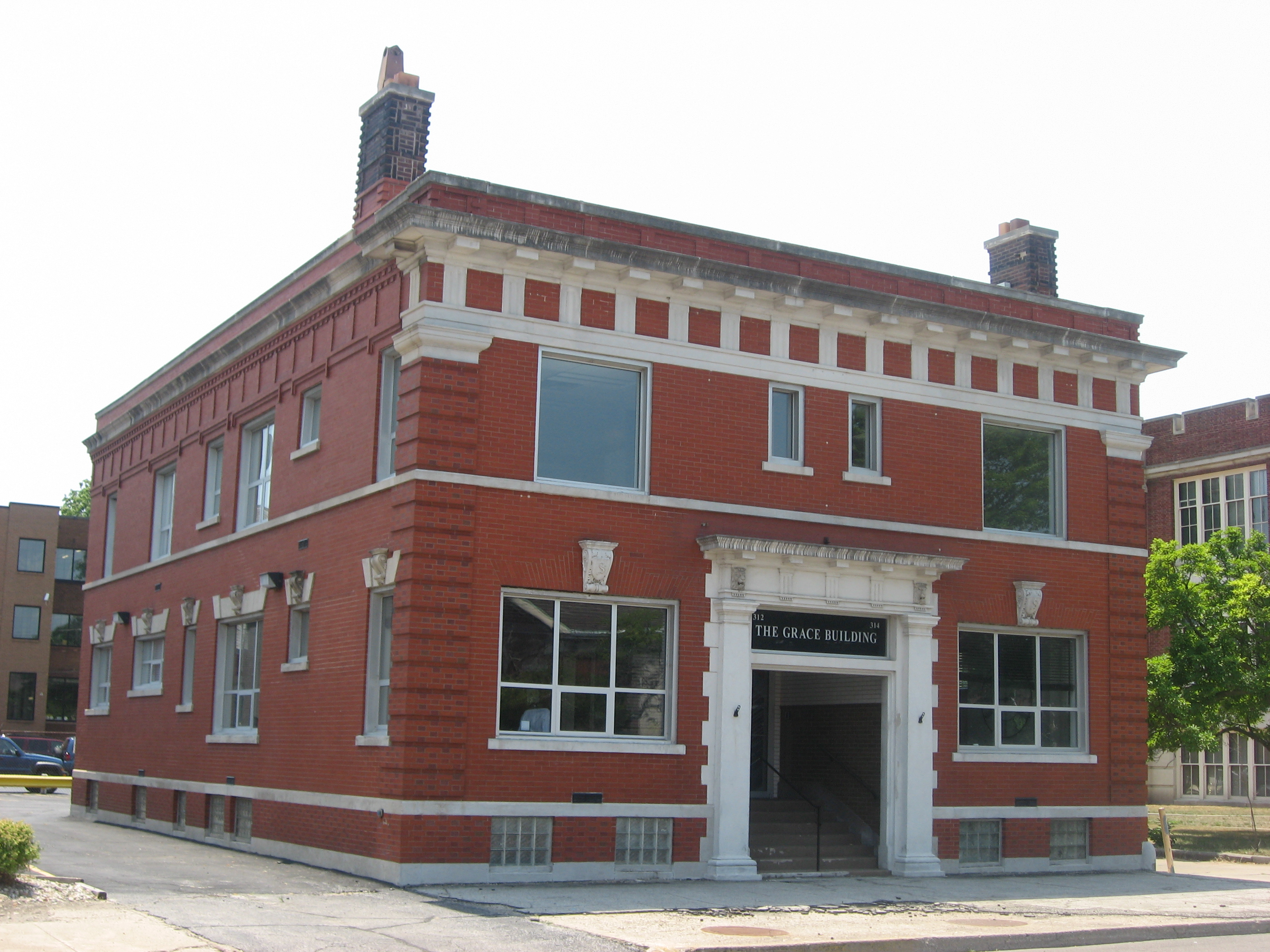
- Summers–Longley House-Building, July 2012

- Location within Indiana Location within the United States
- Location: 312--314 W. Colfax, South Bend, Indiana
- Coordinates: 41°40′39″N 86°15′14″W
- Area: less than one acre
- Built: 1910
- Architectural style: Classical Revival
- MPS: Downtown South Bend Historic MRA
- NRHP reference No.: 85001229
- Added to NRHP: June 5, 1985

Summers–Longley Building, also known as the Grace Building, is a historic double house located at South Bend, Indiana. It was built in 1910, and is a two-story, Classical Revival red brick building with limestone trim. It features a recessed central entrance. The building was originally built as a double house, but has been converted to commercial uses.

It was listed on the National Register of Historic Places in 1985.
