= Walker Field Shelterhouse =

- U.S. National Register of Historic Places
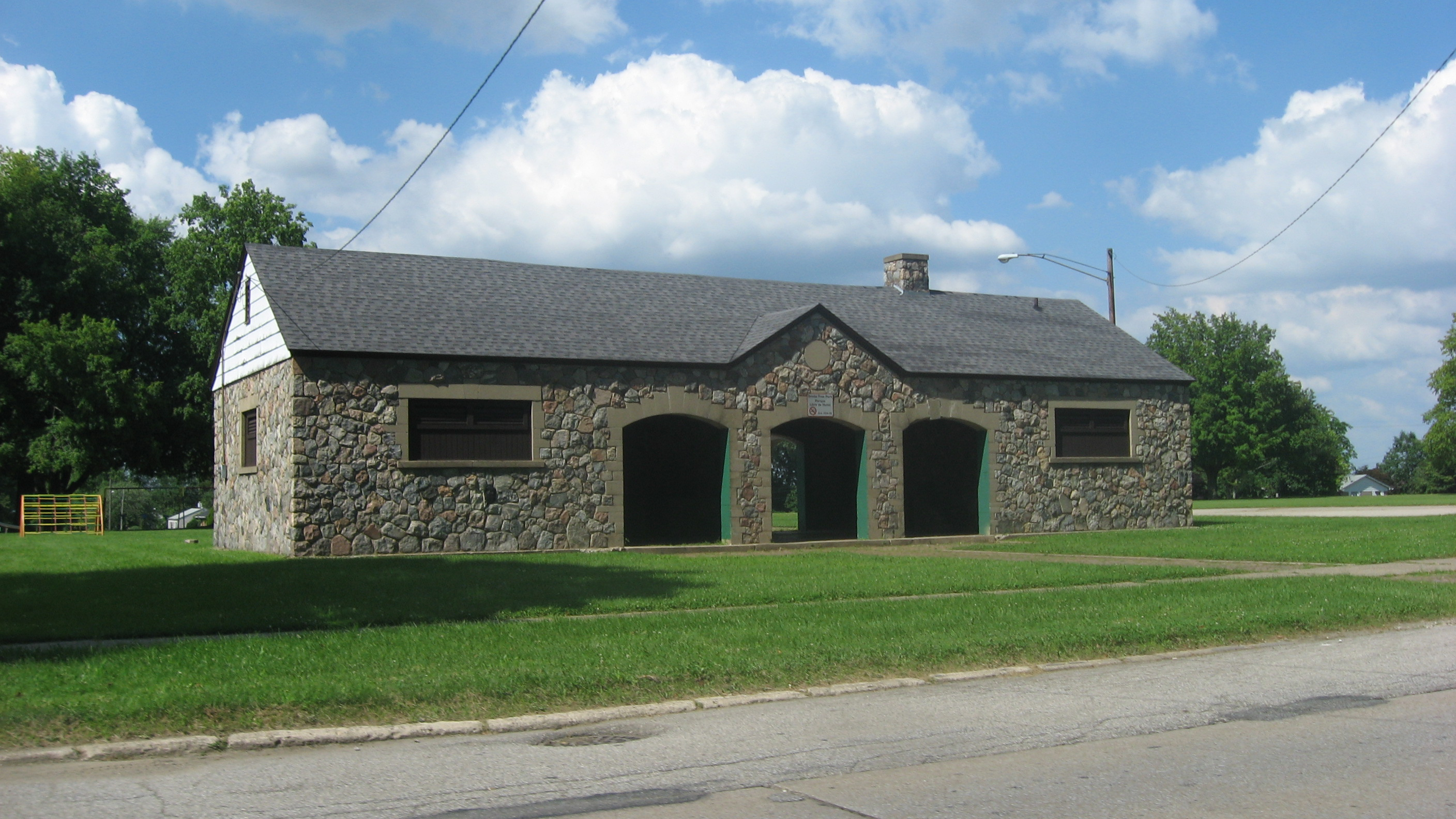
- Walker Field Shelterhouse, July 2013

- Location within Indiana Location within the United States
- Location: 1305 Ewing Ave., South Bend, Indiana
- Coordinates: 41°39′2″N 86°16′10″W
- Area: less than one acre
- Built: 1938
- Architect: Goffeney, Otto Julius; Works Progress Administration
- Architectural style: Bungalow/craftsman
- MPS: New Deal Work Relief Projects in St. Joseph County, Indiana MPS
- NRHP reference No.: 06000876
- Added to NRHP: September 27, 2006

Walker Field Shelterhouse is a historic park shelter located at South Bend, Indiana. It was constructed in 1938 by the Works Progress Administration. It is a one-story, T-shaped fieldstone building. It consists of a gable roofed section with attached hipped roof arcades enclosing space for a wading pool. The central section features three wide segmental arched openings.

It was listed on the National Register of Historic Places in 2006.
