= South Michigan Street Historic District =

Historic district in Indiana, United States

- U.S. National Register of Historic Places
- U.S. Historic district
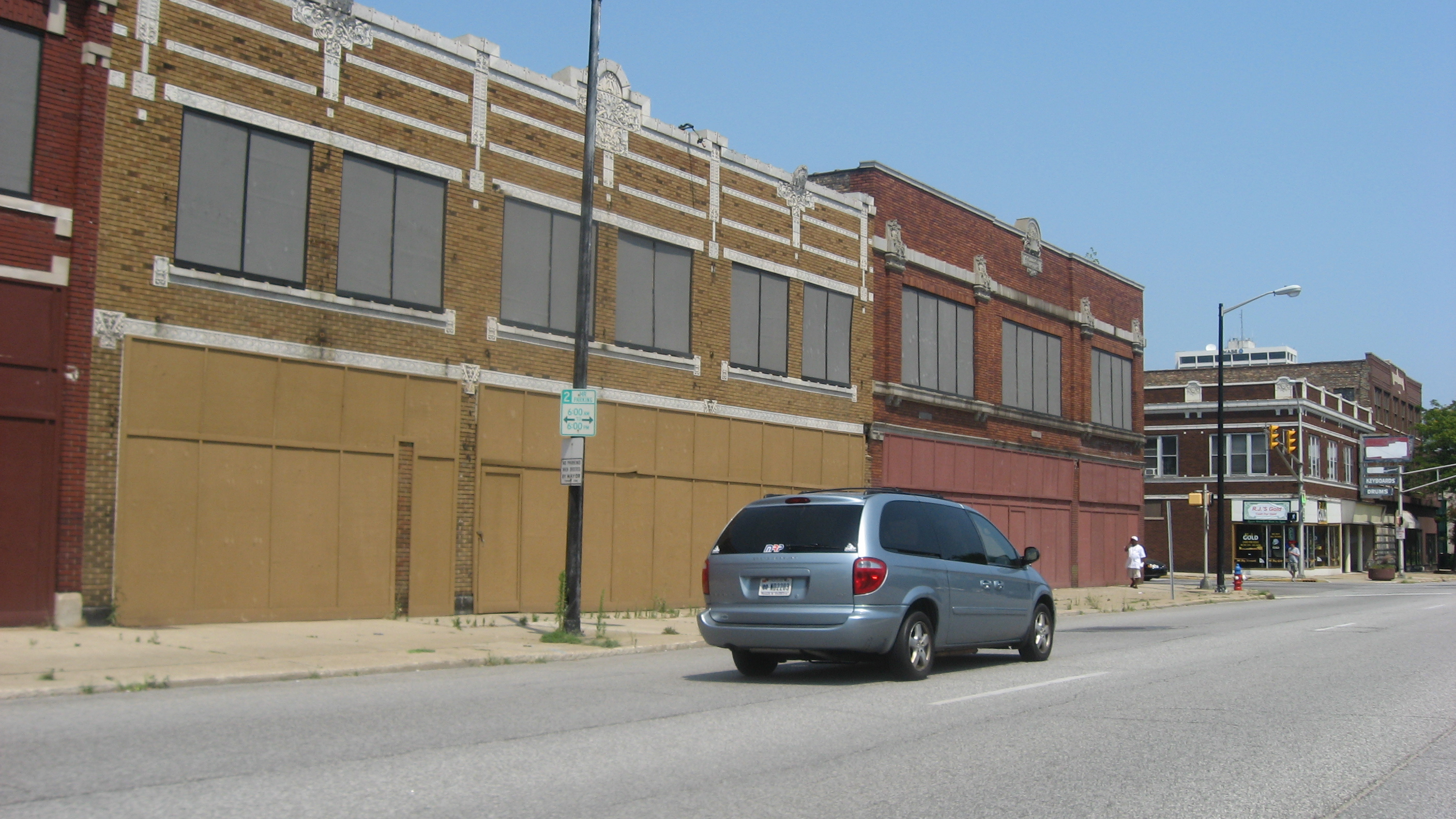
- South Michigan Street Historic District, July 2012

- Location within Indiana Location within the United States
- Location: Roughly along the jct. of Monroe and Michigan Sts., South Bend, Indiana
- Coordinates: 41°40′15″N 86°15′0″W
- Area: 2.9 acres (1.2 ha)
- Built: 1911
- Architect: Schnieder, W.W.
- Architectural style: Late 19th And 20th Century Revivals, Classical Revival
- NRHP reference No.: 97001556
- Added to NRHP: December 15, 1997

South Michigan Street Historic District is a national historic district located at South Bend, Indiana. It encompasses nine contributing buildings on a commercial strip in South Bend. It developed between 1911 and 1945, and included notable examples of Classical Revival architecture. The buildings are primarily two-story, brick commercial buildings, some with stone or terra cotta trim. They include the former Smith-Alsop Paint Store Building (1922), Myer-Seeberger Building (1916), Whitmer-McNeese Building (1928), and LaSalle Paper Company Building (1925).

It was listed on the National Register of Historic Places in 1997.
