= Charles McCormick Building =

Historic building in South Bend, Indiana, US

- U.S. National Register of Historic Places
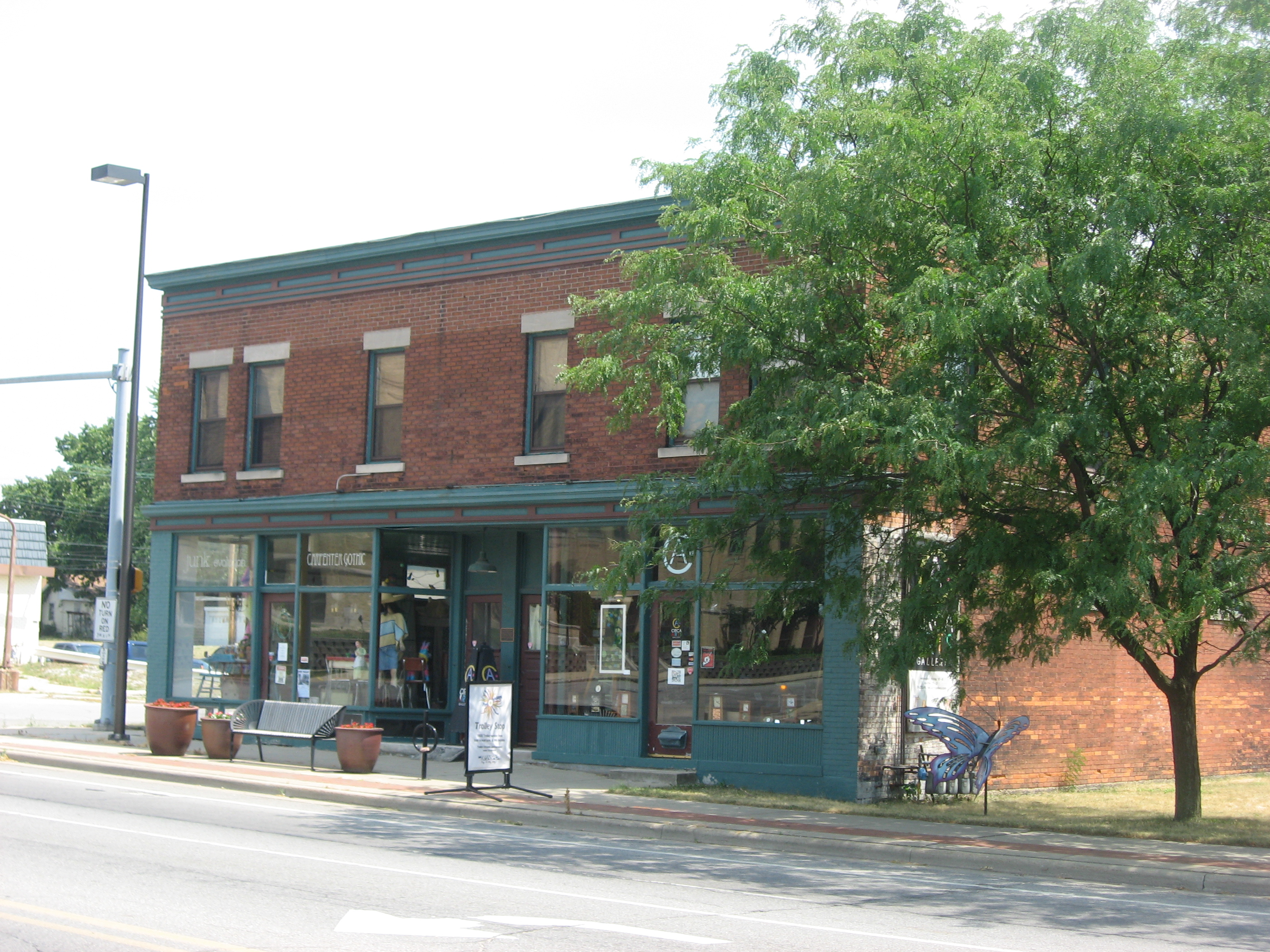
- Charles McCormick Building, July 2012

- Location within Indiana
- Location: 526-532 E. Colfax Ave., South Bend, Indiana
- Coordinates: 41°40′40″N 86°14′36″W
- Area: less than one acre
- Built: 1904
- Architectural style: Late 19th And Early 20th Century American Movements
- MPS: East Bank MPS
- NRHP reference No.: 99000178
- Added to NRHP: February 25, 1999

Charles McCormick Building is a historic commercial building located at South Bend, Indiana. It was built in 1904, and is a two-story, rectangular, brick building on a concrete and stone foundation. It housed commercial enterprises on the first floor and apartments on the second.

It was listed on the National Register of Historic Places in 1999.
