= O'Brien Electric Priming Company =

- U.S. National Register of Historic Places
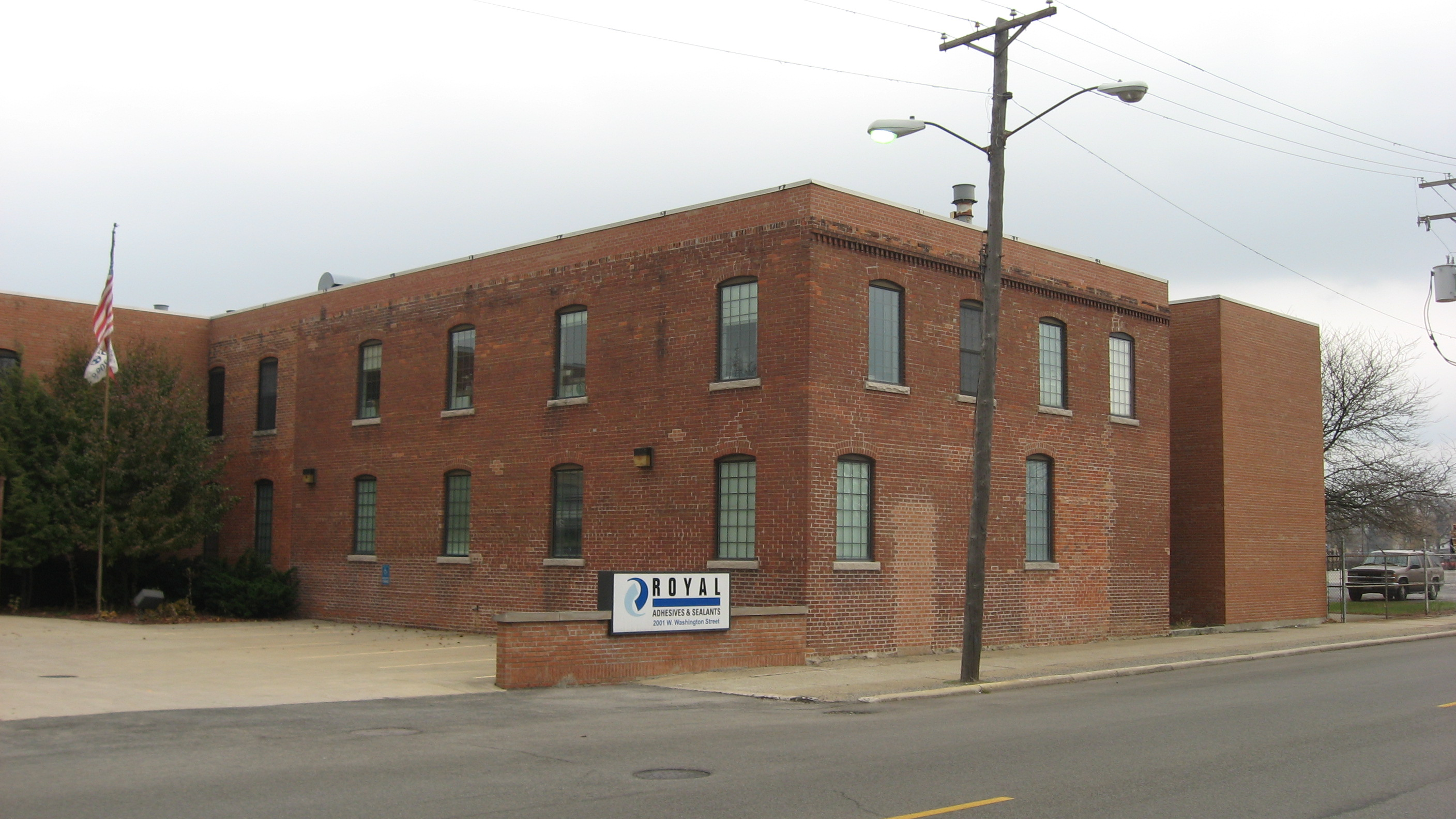
- O'Brien Electric Priming Company, November 2013

- Location within Indiana Location within the United States
- Location: 2001 W. Washington St., South Bend, Indiana
- Coordinates: 41°40′38″N 86°16′41″W
- Area: 8 acres (3.2 ha)
- Built: 1882-1917
- Architect: Multiple
- NRHP reference No.: 83003756
- Added to NRHP: December 28, 1983

O'Brien Electric Priming Company is a historic industrial building located at South Bend, Indiana. It consists of four sections built between 1882 and 1917. The building housed the O'Brien Corporation, a paint manufacturer.

It was listed on the National Register of Historic Places in 1983.
