= Martin Hoban House =

Historic house in Indiana, United States

- U.S. National Register of Historic Places
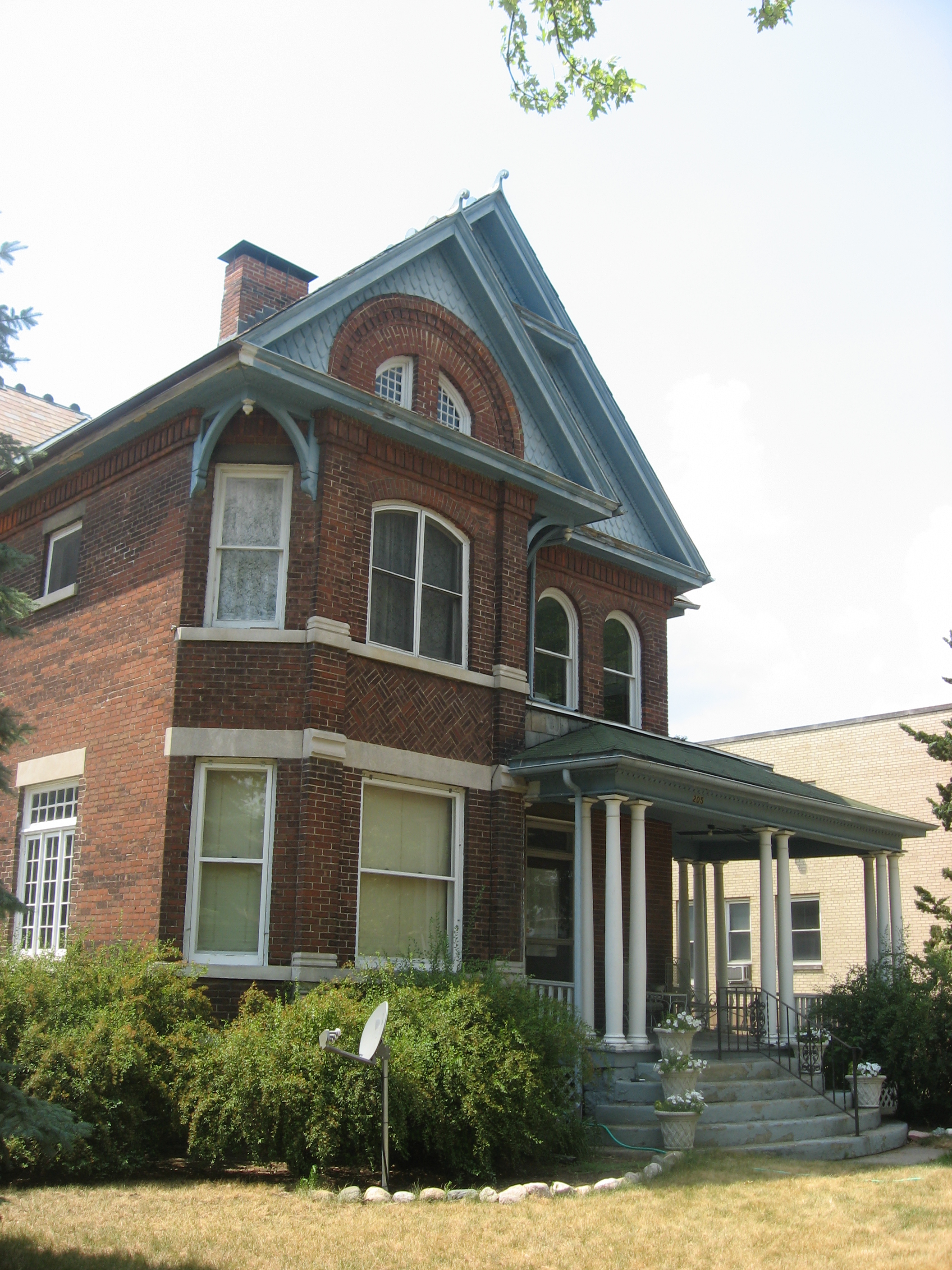
- Martin Hoban House, July 2012

- Location within Indiana Location within the United States
- Location: 205 N. St. Louis Blvd., South Bend, Indiana
- Coordinates: 41°40′41″N 86°14′30″W
- Area: less than one acre
- Built: 1896
- Architect: Hoban, Martin
- Architectural style: Queen Anne
- MPS: East Bank MPS
- NRHP reference No.: 99000171
- Added to NRHP: February 18, 1999

Martin Hoban House is a historic home located at South Bend, Indiana. It was built in 1896, and is a 2 1/2-story, irregular plan, Queen Anne style brick dwelling. It has a cross-gable roof and sits on a granite and limestone foundation. It features a two-story projecting bay, round arched windows, and a one-story hip roofed front porch supported by Tuscan order columns.

It was listed on the National Register of Historic Places in 1999.
