= Singer Manufacturing–South Bend Lathe Co. Historic District =

Historic district in Indiana, United States

- U.S. National Register of Historic Places
- U.S. Historic district
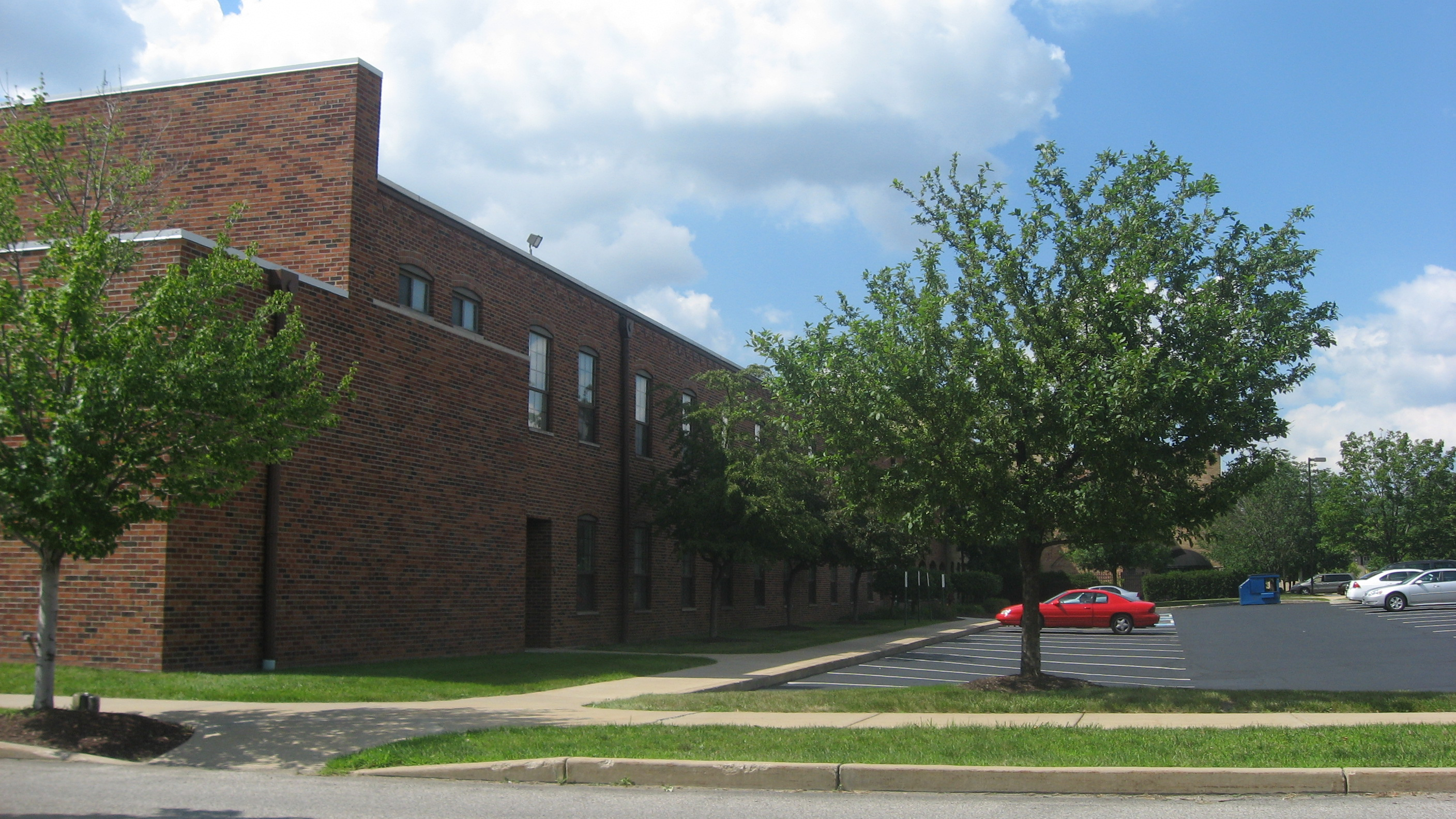
- Singer manufacturing facility in South Bend, July 2013

- Location within Indiana Location within the United States
- Location: Madison St. between N. Niles Ave. and St. Joseph R., South Bend, Indiana
- Coordinates: 41°40′56″N 86°14′46″W
- Area: 12.5 acres (5.1 ha)
- Built: 1868
- Architectural style: Late Victorian
- MPS: East Bank MPS
- NRHP reference No.: 99000174
- Added to NRHP: February 18, 1999

The Singer Manufacturing–South Bend Lathe Co. Historic District is a national historic district located at South Bend, Indiana. It encompasses four contributing buildings, one additional contributing structure, and one further contributing site as contributing properties. It developed between about 1868 and 1947, and includes notable examples of Late Victorian style industrial architecture. The buildings are associated with the Singer Manufacturing Company and its successors. They include the original three-story, brick Singer Manufacturing Company building (1868), Singer Manufacturing Company / South Bend Lathe complex (c. 1870–1875, and later), and Singer Manufacturing Company Employees Club Room / Supply Building (1893).

It was listed on the National Register of Historic Places in 1999.
