= W. N. Bergan–J. C. Lauber Company Building =

- U.S. National Register of Historic Places
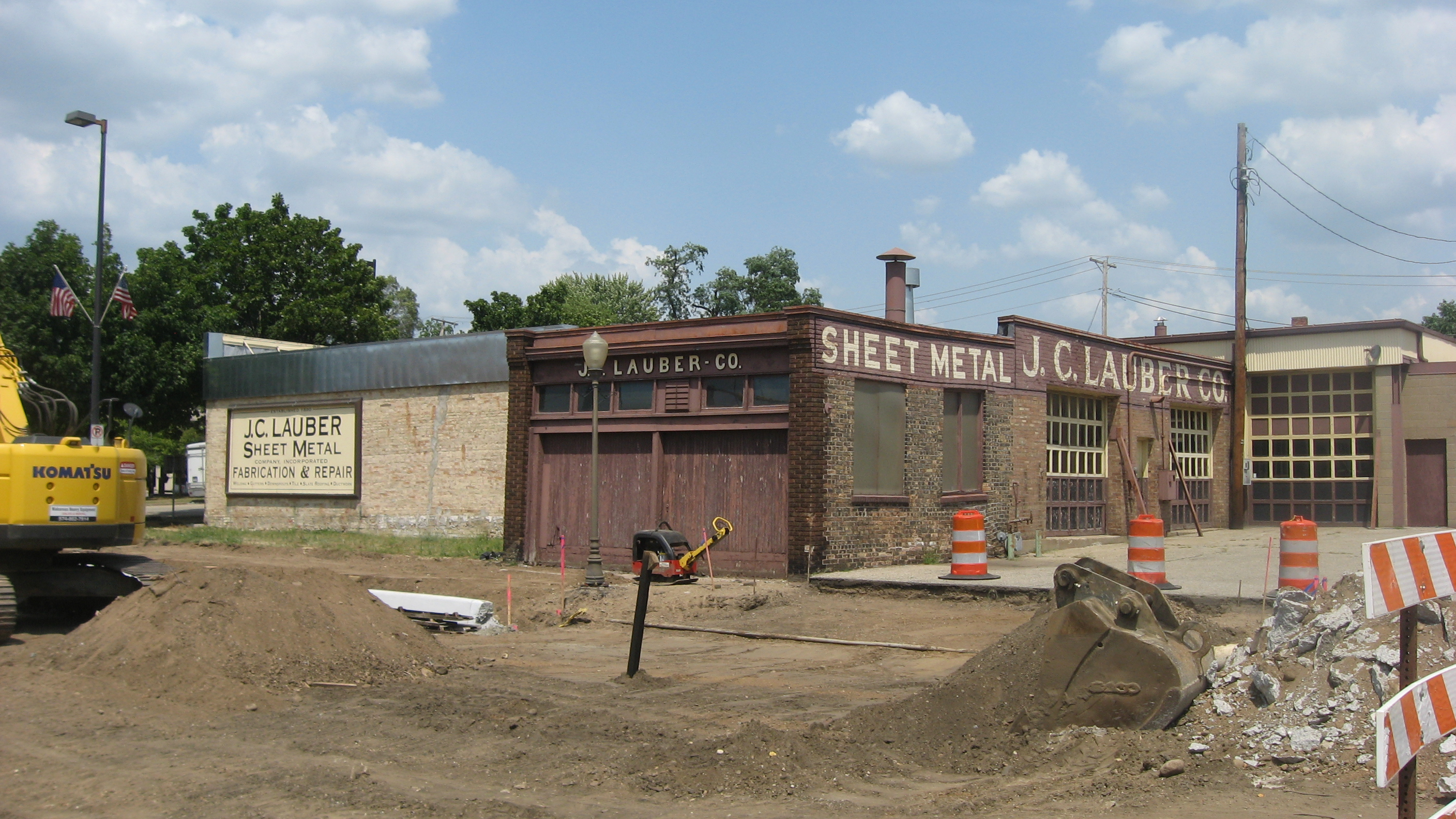
- W. N. Bergan–J. C. Lauber Company Building, July 2012

- Location within Indiana Location within the United States
- Location: 502-504 E. La Salle St., South Bend, Indiana
- Coordinates: 41°40′44″N 86°14′39″W
- Area: less than one acre
- Built: 1882, 1900, 1924
- Architectural style: Italianate
- MPS: East Bank MPS
- NRHP reference No.: 99000180
- Added to NRHP: February 18, 1999

W. N. Bergan–J. C. Lauber Company Building is a historic manufacturing complex located at South Bend, St. Joseph County, Indiana.

The original Bergan Building was built in 1882, and is a two-story, Italianate style brick industrial building. It features an ornate cornice and frieze. Also on the property are two one-story contributing brick buildings. The buildings have housed the J. C. Lauber Sheet Metal Company, Inc. since 1900. The company produced much of the sheet metal and roofing for buildings in early-20th-century South Bend. It was listed on the National Register of Historic Places in 1999.

== History ==
Joseph Charles Lauber was born in Hamilton, Ohio, in 1868 and moved to South Bend in 1890 to work for Meyer & Poehlman, described as "the largest tinsmith and hardware business in the area." In 1890 Lauber left the company to begin his own. What would later be known as the J.C. Lauber Company continued producing speciality metal products throughout the 20th century from several buildings along the 500 block of East LaSalle Avenue on the east side of South Bend.

Among the many buildings the company produced architectural elements for, Lauber produced "galvanized iron work, sheet metal and canopy" for the Palace Theatre, now known as the Morris Performing Arts Center.

In 2016 the building was purchased by the local real estate developer Frank Perri, who owns additional properties on the city's east side.
