= Northside Boulevard Riverwall =

- U.S. National Register of Historic Places
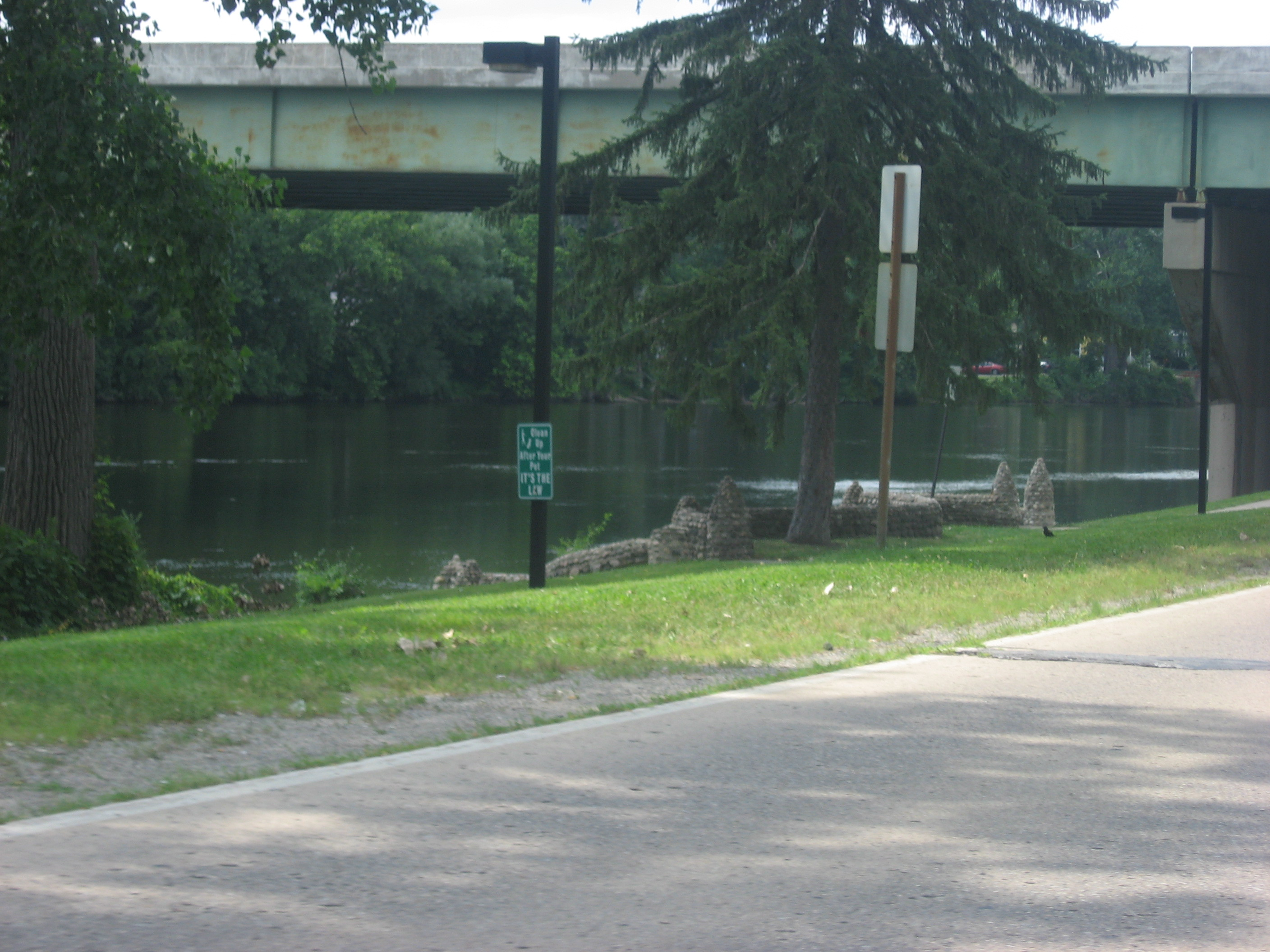
- Northside Boulevard Riverwall, July 2013

- Location within Indiana Location within the United States
- Location: 600-1100 Northside Blvd., South Bend, Indiana
- Coordinates: 41°41′10″N 86°15′1″W
- Area: 3.8 acres (1.5 ha)
- Built: 1935-1938
- Built by: Works Progress Administration
- MPS: New Deal Work Relief Projects in St. Joseph County, Indiana MPS
- NRHP reference No.: 06000877
- Added to NRHP: September 27, 2006

Northside Boulevard Riverwall is a historic public improvement located at South Bend, Indiana. It was constructed between 1935 and 1938 by the Works Progress Administration. It includes a 3,360 foot long fieldstone riverwall, a fieldstone, a fieldstone grandstand, and five sets of fieldstone stairways leading to the St. Joseph River.

It was listed on the National Register of Historic Places in 2006.
