= Colonial Gardens Commercial Historic District =

Historic district in Indiana, United States

- U.S. National Register of Historic Places
- U.S. Historic district
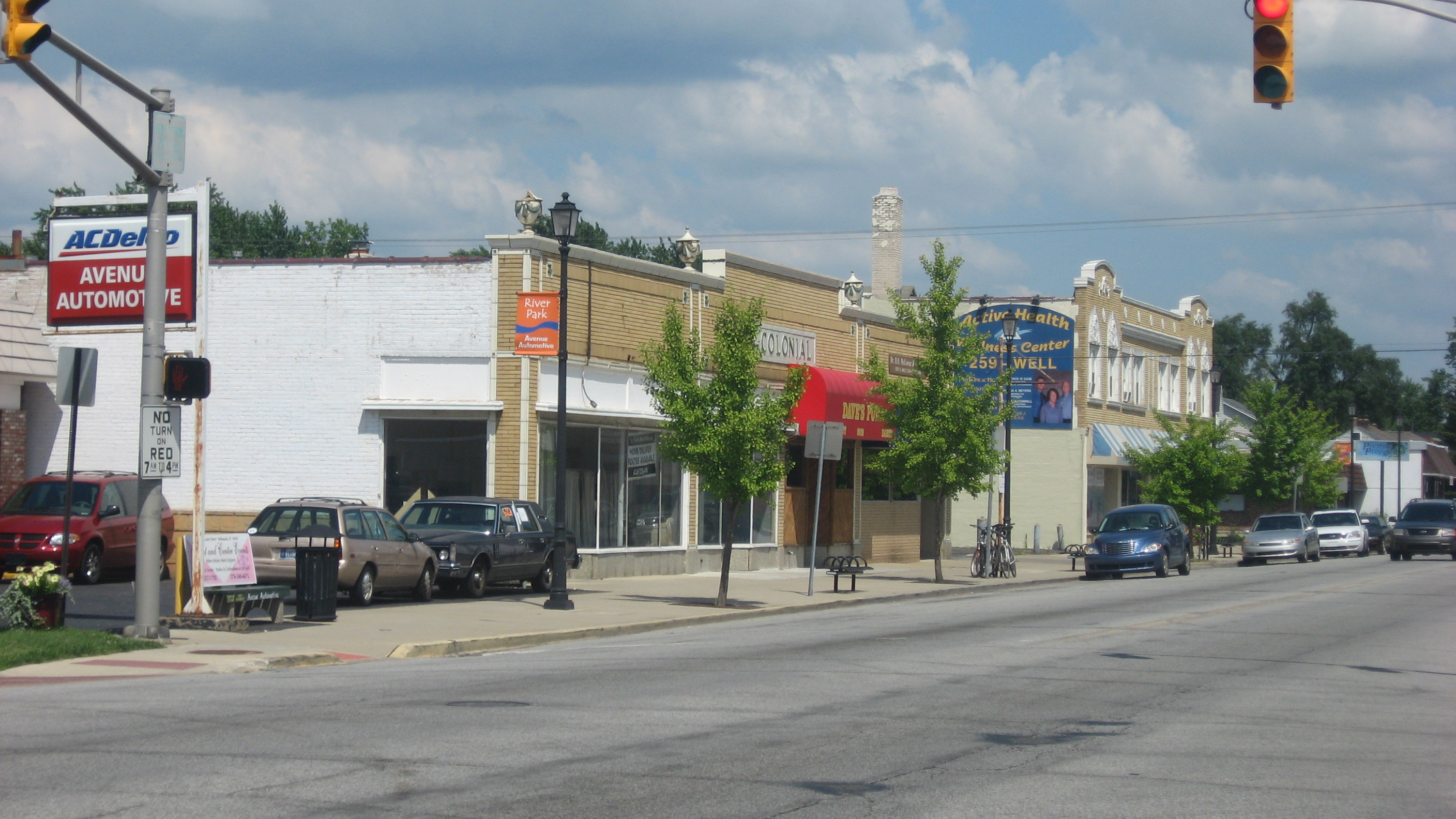
- Mishawaka Avenue, July 2013

- Location within Indiana Location within the United States
- Location: 2919-3027 Mishawaka Ave., South Bend, Indiana
- Coordinates: 41°39′57″N 86°12′19″W
- Area: 1.8 acres (0.73 ha)
- Built: 1925
- Architect: Schnieder, W.W.
- Architectural style: Late 19th And 20th Century Revivals, Classical Revival
- NRHP reference No.: 97001540
- Added to NRHP: December 15, 1997

Colonial Gardens Commercial Historic District is a national historic district located at South Bend, Indiana. It encompasses four contributing buildings on a commercial strip in South Bend. It developed between about 1925 and 1947, and includes notable examples of Classical Revival style architecture. The buildings are tan brick commercial buildings with terra cotta trim. They include the former River Park Theater (1927) and Colonial Building.

It was listed on the National Register of Historic Places in 1997.
