= St. Joseph County Infirmary =

- U.S. National Register of Historic Places
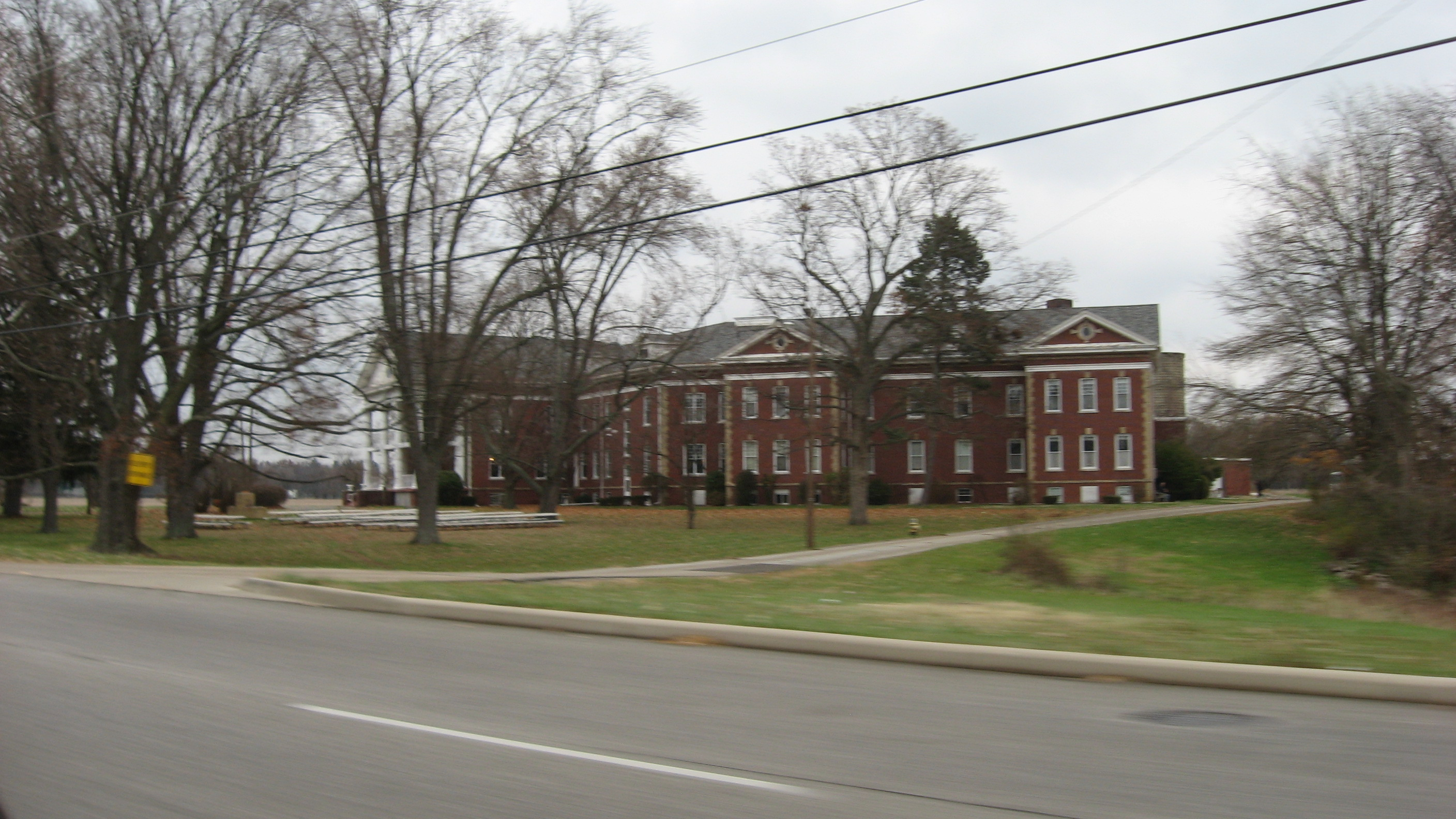
- St. Joseph County Infirmary, November 2013

- Location within Indiana Location within the United States
- Location: 3016 Portage Ave., South Bend, Indiana
- Coordinates: 41°43′07″N 86°16′56″W
- Area: 113.8 acres (46.1 ha)
- Built: 1906
- Architect: Freyermuth & Maurer
- Architectural style: Classical Revival
- NRHP reference No.: 00000670
- Added to NRHP: June 15, 2000

St. Joseph County Infirmary, also known as Portage Manor, is a historic sanitarium located at South Bend, Indiana. The main building was built in 1906, and is a two-story, Classical Revival style red brick building with two wings. It features a two-story pedimented portico supported by four Ionic order columns. Also on the property is a contributing brick smokehouse. It was originally constructed as a county home for the elderly and incapacitated indigent.

It was listed on the National Register of Historic Places in 2000. As of 2024, it is permanently closed and slated to be destroyed.
