= Maurice Egan House =

Historic house in Indiana, United States

- U.S. National Register of Historic Places
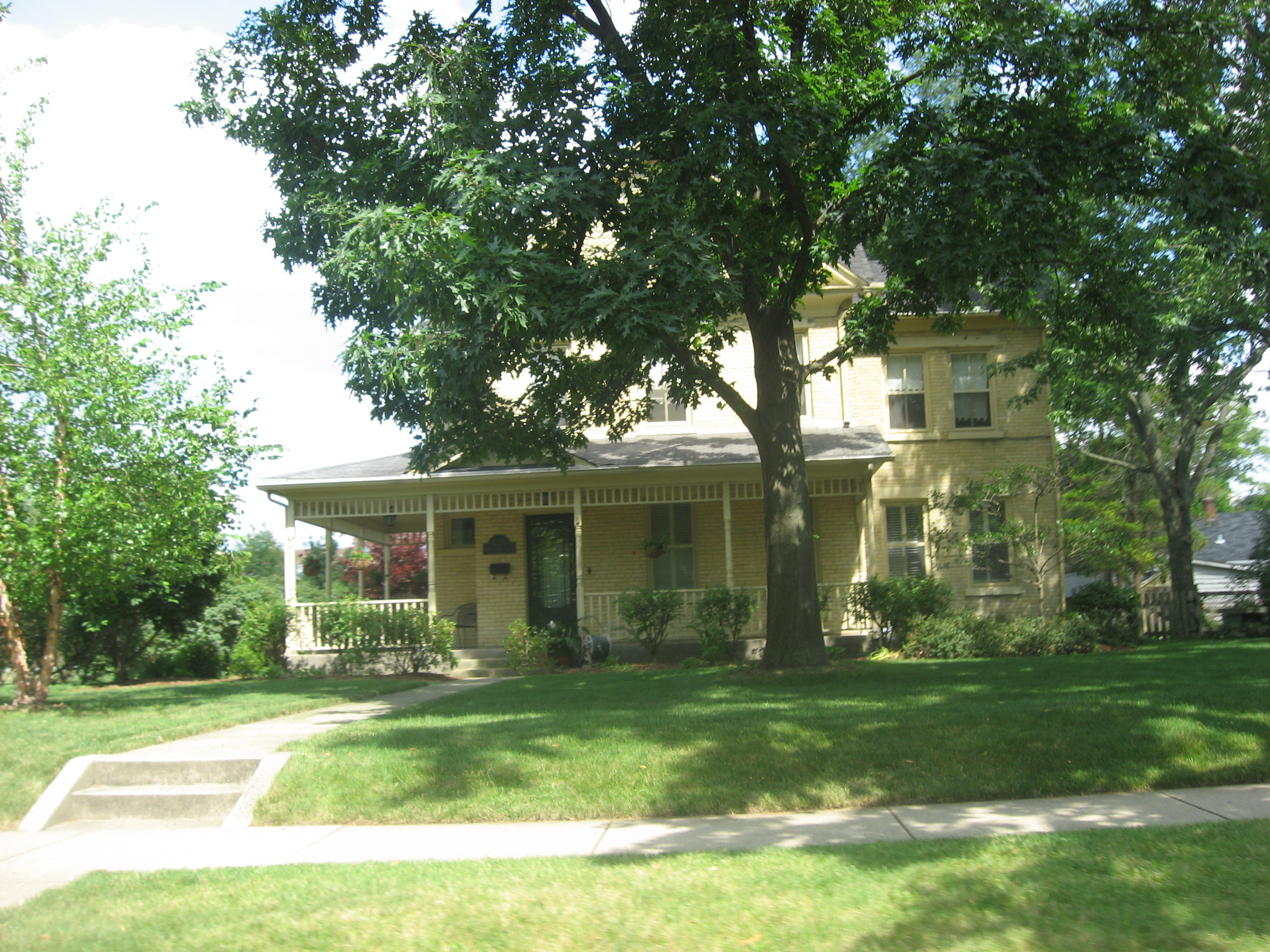
- Maurice Egan House, July 2013

- Location within Indiana Location within the United States
- Location: 1136 N. Notre Dame Ave., South Bend, Indiana
- Coordinates: 41°41′27″N 86°14′18″W
- Area: less than one acre
- Built: 1889
- Architect: Brehmer, Charles
- Architectural style: Queen Anne
- MPS: East Bank MPS
- NRHP reference No.: 99000175
- Added to NRHP: February 18, 1999

Maurice Egan House is a historic home located at South Bend, Indiana. It was built in 1889, and is a 2 1/2-story, rectangular, Queen Anne style yellow ochre brick dwelling. It has a two-story wing and features a wraparound porch.

It was listed on the National Register of Historic Places in 1999.
