= Northern Indiana Gas and Electric Company Building =

- Formerly listed on the U.S. National Register of Historic Places
- Location within Indiana Location within the United States
- Location: 221 N. Michigan, South Bend, Indiana
- Coordinates: 41°40′43″N 86°15′2″W
- Area: less than one acre
- Built: 1915
- MPS: Downtown South Bend Historic MRA
- NRHP reference No.: 85001225

Significant dates
- Added to NRHP: June 5, 1985
- Removed from NRHP: October 9, 2012

Northern Indiana Gas and Electric Company Building, also known as the Roma Building, was a historic office building located at South Bend, Indiana. It was built in 1915, and was a three-story, brick building sheathed in pink terra cotta. It featured a projecting cornice with brackets and modillions.

It was listed on the National Register of Historic Places in 1985, and delisted in 2012.
