= Martin Wenger House =

Historic house in Indiana, United States

- U.S. National Register of Historic Places
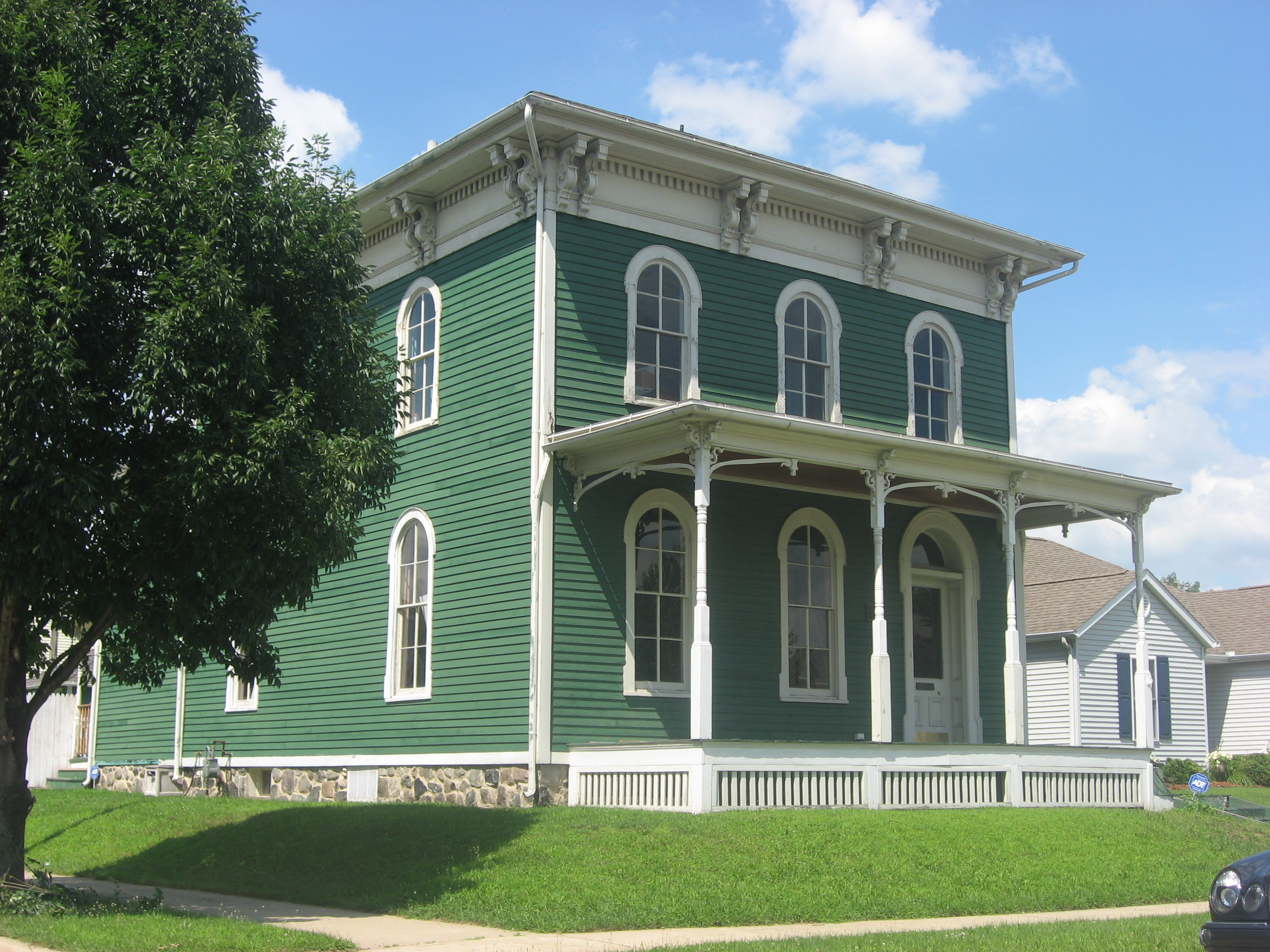
- Martin Wenger Farmhouse, July 2013

- Location within Indiana Location within the United States
- Location: 701 E. Pennsylvania, South Bend, Indiana
- Coordinates: 41°39′41″N 86°14′27″W
- Area: less than one acre
- Built: 1851
- Built by: Wenger, Martin
- Architectural style: Italianate
- NRHP reference No.: 00000715
- Added to NRHP: June 22, 2000

Martin Wenger House is a historic home located at South Bend, Indiana. It was built in 1851, and is a two-story, Italianate style frame dwelling. It sits on a fieldstone foundation and has a low-pitched hipped roof. It features a full-width front porch, paired scroll-sawn brackets, and round arched window openings.

It was listed on the National Register of Historic Places in 2000.
