= Indiana Landmarks =

Nonprofit organization based in Indiana, United States

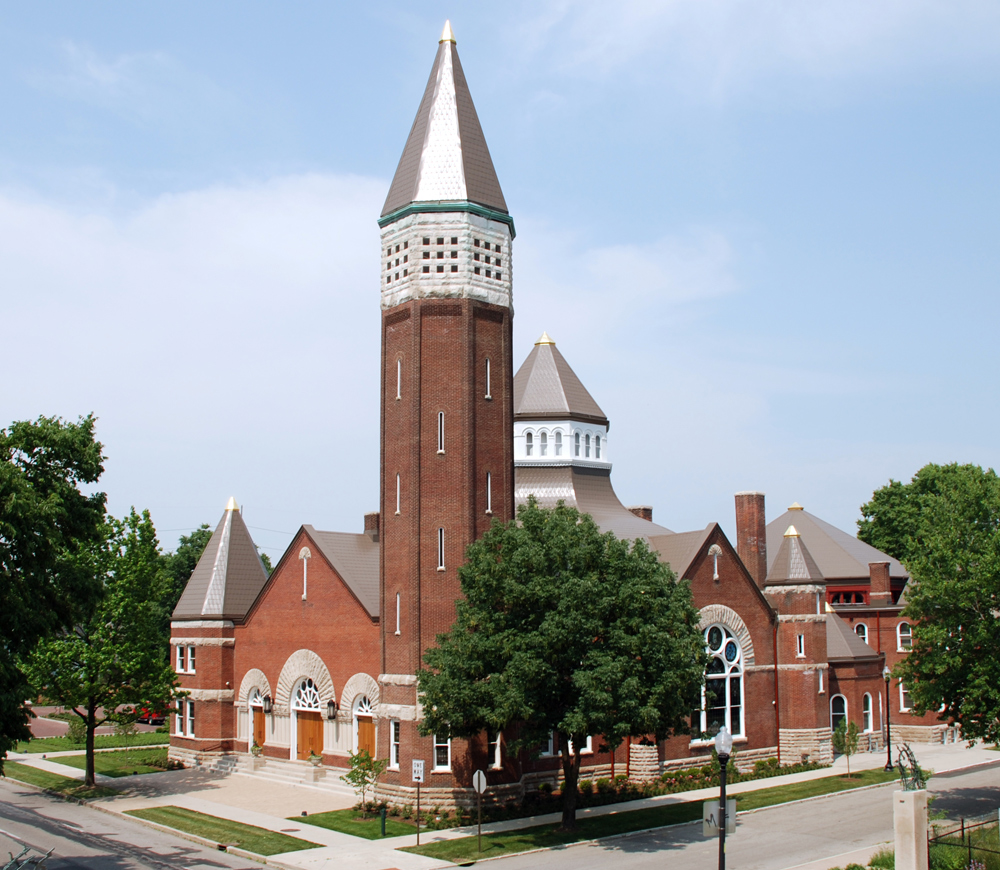
- Indiana Landmarks Center, located in the former Central Avenue United Methodist Church in Indianapolis.
- Formation: 1960; 66 years ago
- Founder: Eli Lilly
- Founded at: Indianapolis, Indiana
- Purpose: Historic preservation
- Headquarters: Indiana Landmarks Center
- Location(s): 1201 Central Avenue; Indianapolis, Indiana, United States
- President: J. Marshall Davis
- Vice President and CFO: Madonna Wagner
- Vice President of Preservation Services: Mark Dollase
- Vice President for Development: Sharon Gamble
- Board of directors: 34
- Publication: Indiana Preservation
- Revenue: $4,186,400 (2019)
- Expenses: $4,137,900 (2019)
- Endowment: $85.6 million (2019)
- Staff: 40 (2020)
- Website: indianalandmarks.org
- Formerly called: Historic Landmarks Foundation of Indiana

Indiana Landmarks is a private non-governmental heritage preservation organization focused on the U.S. state of Indiana. It is America's largest private statewide historic preservation organization. Founded in 1960 as Historic Landmarks Foundation of Indiana by a volunteer group of civic and business leaders led by Indianapolis pharmaceutical executive Eli Lilly, it has nearly 6,000 members. At the end of 2023, an independent auditor reported a total endowment of 67.8 million for the organization. The organization simplified its name to Indiana Landmarks in 2010.

Indiana Landmarks owns and restores historic buildings, buys and sells vacant and endangered property, and helps people throughout Indiana save and restore historic places through a variety of programs including grants, loans, and advocacy.

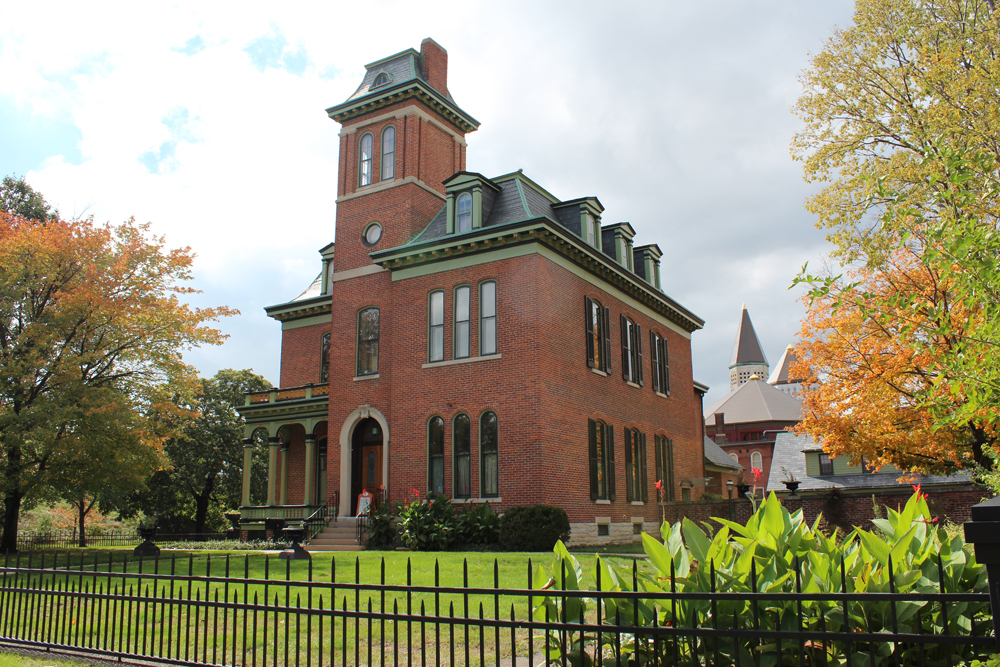
Morris-Butler House in Indianapolis

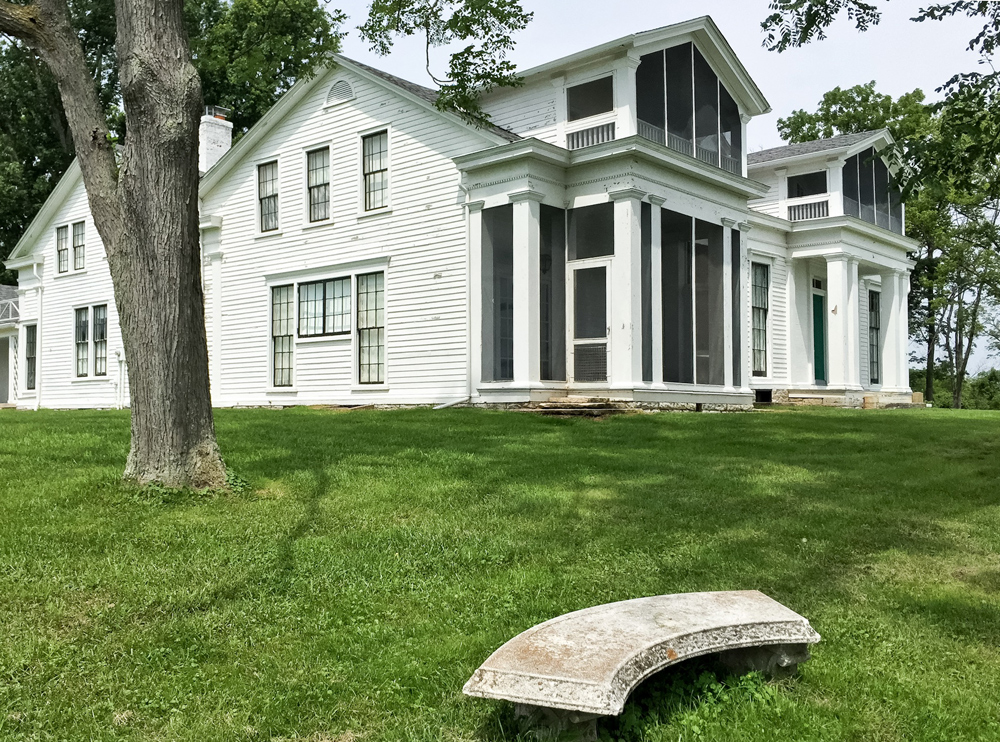
Veraestau Historic Site, Aurora

Indiana Landmarks employs staff at its state headquarters in Indianapolis and in regional offices throughout the state of Indiana. Regional offices are located in South Bend, Gary, New Albany, Aurora, Evansville, Richmond, Wabash, and Terre Haute. The organization's state headquarters are located at the former Central Avenue United Methodist Church in Indianapolis, now known as Indiana Landmarks Center. In addition to Indiana Landmarks Center, Indiana Landmarks owns and operates two historic properties as event and rental venues: the Morris-Butler House in Indianapolis and Veraestau historic site in Aurora, Indiana. Landmarks' honorary board chair is Indiana's former Chief Justice Randall T. Shepard. The organization's first project was restoration of the 1865 Morris-Butler House in Indianapolis. Eli Lilly personally underwrote the acquisition and restoration of the house as a museum of Victorian decorative arts. Though the Morris-Butler House no longer operates as a museum, it is part of the Indiana Landmarks Center campus and functions as an event and rental facility.

One of Indiana Landmarks' largest projects was the $30 million+ restoration of the West Baden Springs Hotel's exterior and public spaces. Indiana Landmarks helped lead the effort to bring riverboat gaming to Orange County, Indiana, as a way to revitalize the French Lick Resort Casino and the West Baden Springs Hotel.

== New name and headquarters ==
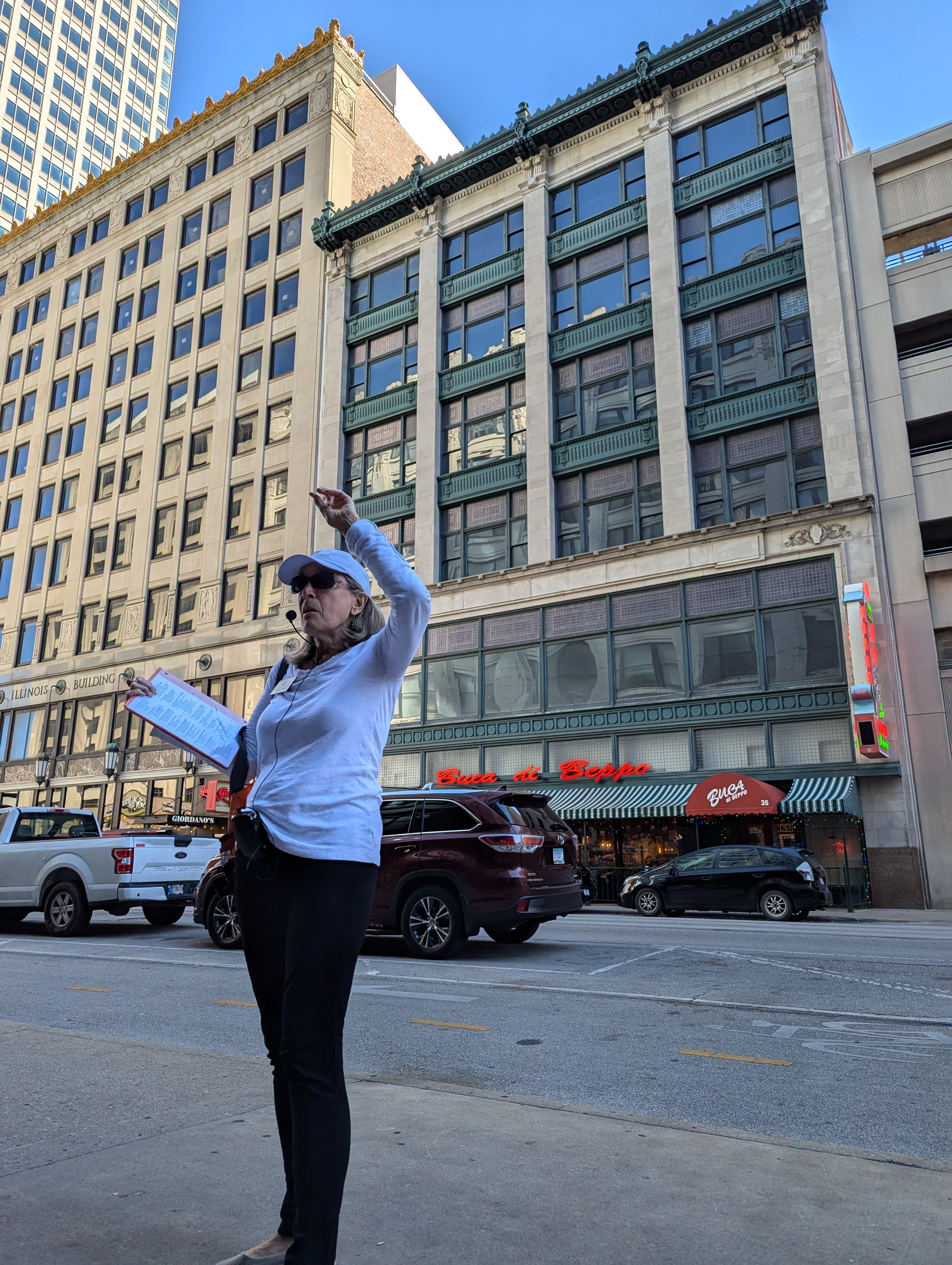
An Indiana Landmarks guide giving the "Decoding Downtown Indy" walking tour in 2024.

In April 2010, in conjunction with the organization's 50th anniversary, Indiana Landmarks announced its name change from Historic Landmarks Foundation of Indiana. At the same time, it announced that medical device entrepreneur Bill Cook and his wife, Gayle had pledged $17 million to renovate the former Central Avenue United Methodist Church at 12th Street and Central Avenue in the Old Northside Historic District of Indianapolis as a performance space and new headquarters for the organization, to be known as Indiana Landmarks Center.

== Endangered landmarks ==
Each May (National Historic Preservation Month), Indiana Landmarks announces a list of the state's 10 Most Endangered landmarks. Circumstances that cause properties to be named to the list generally involve one or more of the following factors: demolition threat, abandonment, neglectful owner, dilapidation, obsolete use, lack of money for repairs, unreasonable above-market sale price, out-of-the-way location, or encroaching sprawl. Indiana Landmarks uses the 10 Most Endangered list to bring public attention to the imperiled sites and mobilize support for their preservation.

10 Most Endangered
Year	Name	Location	Photo
2015	Bedford Elks Building	Bedford	
2015	Camp Chesterfield	Chesterfield	Historic Camp Chesterfield
2015	First Presbyterian Church & Lafayette Building	South Bend	
2015	Indiana County Homes	Statewide	
2015	Indiana Medical History Museum	Indianapolis	Indiana Medical History Museum
2015	IOOF United Brethren Block	Huntington, IN	
2015	McCurdy Hotel	Evansville	McCurdy Hotel
2015	McDonald House	Attica	McDonald House
2015	Mills House	Greenwood	
2015	Rivoli Theater	Indianapolis	Rivoli Theater
2016	Beech Church	Carthage	Beech Church
2016	Rivoli Theater	Indianapolis	Rivoli Theater
2016	Hazelwood	Muncie	"Hazelwood" Alva Kitselman House
2016	Speakman House	Rising Sun	
2016	Washington County Courthouse	Salem	Washington County Courthouse (Salem, Indiana)
2016	Monon High Bridge	Delphi	
2016	Pryor’s Country Place	Fox Lake (near Angola)	
2016	Ford Motor Company Assembly Branch	Indianapolis	
2016	South Side Turnverein Hall	Indianapolis	South Side Turnverein Hall
2016	Camp Chesterfield	Chesterfield	Camp Chesterfield
2017	Marion National Bank Building	Marion	
2017	Newkirk Mansion	Connersville	Newkirk Mansion
2017	Former Fire Station 18	Indianapolis	
2017	Old Marquette School	South Bend	Marquette School (South Bend, Indiana)
2017	Old YMCA	Terre Haute	
2017	Pryor's Country Place	Fox Lake (near Angola)	
2017	Round and polygonal barns	Statewide	
2017	Simpson Hall, Indiana School for the Deaf	Indianapolis	
2017	Speakman House	Rising Sun	
2017	Washington County Courthouse	Salem	Washington County Courthouse (Salem, Indiana)
2018	Cannelton Historic District	Cannelton	
2018	Commandant’s Row at Indiana Veterans’ Home	West Lafayette	
2018	The Courtyard Inn	Rising Sun	
2018	Cravenhurst Barn	Madison	
2018	Muncie Fieldhouse	Muncie	
2018	National Bank Building	Marion	
2018	North Christian Church	Columbus	North Christian Church
2018	Old Masonic Hall	Knightstown	
2018	Rocky Edge	Terre Haute	
2018	Saint Joseph’s College campus	Rensselaer	Saint Joseph's College Chapel and lawn
2019	Crump Theatre	Columbus	Crump Theatre
2019	Pulaski County Courthouse	Winamac	Pulaski County Courthouse
2019	Church of the Holy Cross	Indianapolis	
2019	Mineral Spring Hotel	Paoli	
2019	Downtown Attica	Attica	Attica Downtown Historic District
2019	Peru Circus Winter Quarters	Peru	
2019	Reid Memorial Presbyterian Church	Richmond	Reid Memorial Presbyterian Church
2019	John Howe Mansion	Howe	
2019	Commandant's Row	West Lafayette	
2019	Cannelton Historic District	Perry County	Old Perry County Courthouse in Cannelton's Historic District
2020	Tipton County Jail and Sheriff's Residence	Tipton	Tipton County Jail and Sheriff's Home
2020	Romweber House	Batesville	
2020	Union Literary Institute	Union City	Union Literary Institute
2020	Church of the Holy Cross	Indianapolis	
2020	Downtown Attica	Attica	Attica Downtown Historic District
2020	Elwood Carnegie Library	Madison County	
2020	Reid Memorial Presbyterian Church	Richmond	Reid Memorial Presbyterian Church
2020	Falley-O'Gara-Pyke House	Lafayette	
2020	Theodore Roosevelt High School	Gary	Theodore Roosevelt High School, Gary
2020	Monon Station	Bedford	
2021	James M. Shields Memorial Gymnasium	Seymour	
2021	Davis Clinic	Marion	
2021	B.G. Pollard Lodge#1242	Bloomington	
2021	Oxford Community Mausoleum	Benton County	
2021	Kamm & Schellinger Brewery	Mishawaka	Kamm and Schellinger Brewery
2021	Monon Depot	Bedford	
2021	Theodore Roosevelt High School	Gary	Theodore Roosevelt High School, Gary
2021	Courthouse Annex	New Castle	
2021	Tipton County Jail & Sheriff’s Residence	Tipton	Tipton County Jail & Sheriff's Residence
2021	Falley-O'Gara-Pyke House	Lafayette	
2022	Cades Mill Covered Bridge	Fountain County	
2022	Hulman Building & Garage	Evansville	Hulman Building
2022	Stinesville Commercial Buildings	Monroe County	Stinesville Commercial Historic District
2022	First Friends Church	Marion	
2022	Knox County Poor Asylum	Vincennes	
2022	Birdsell Mansion	South Bend	
2022	Geter Means House	Gary	
2022	Kamm & Schellinger Brewery	Mishawaka	Kamm and Schellinger Brewery
2022	James M. Shields Memorial Gymnasium	Seymour	
2022	Courthouse Annex	New Castle	
2023	Starr Historic District	Richmond	Church and house in the Starr Historical District
2023	Birdsell Mansion	South Bend	
2023	Knox County Poor Asylum	Vincennes	
2023	Historic Fraternal Lodges	Vernon and Bedford	
2023	Thomas & Louisa Little House	Plainfield	
2023	Hulman Building & Garage	Evansville	Hulman Building
2023	State Theater	Anderson	
2023	First Friends Church	Marion	
2023	Stinesville Commercial Buildings	Monroe County	Stinesville Commercial Building
2023	International Harvester Engineering Building	Fort Wayne	

== Annual awards ==
Indiana Landmarks issues several annual awards, including:

- Cook Cup for Outstanding Restoration
- Sandi Servaas Memorial Award
- Williamson Prize

Together with the Indiana Farm Bureau, Indiana Landmarks co-sponsors the John Arnold Rural Preservation Award.
