= Jacob Cox =

American painter

- Born: November 9, 1810; Philadelphia, Pennsylvania
- Died: January 2, 1892 (aged 81)
- Burial place: Crown Hill Cemetery and Arboretum, Section 33, Lot 142; 39.8204845°N 86.1698481°W
- Occupations: American landscape and portrait painter

Jacob Cox (November 9, 1810 – January 2, 1892) was an American landscape and portrait painter in Indianapolis, Indiana. Several of his paintings are in the Morris-Butler House. He is also known for his paintings of Indiana Governors James B. Ray, Noah Noble, David Wallace, Samuel Bigger, Joseph A. Wright, and Henry S. Lane. In 1941 a retrospective exhibition of his works was held at the John Herron Art Museum.

== Information ==
Cox was born in Philadelphia and arrived in Indianapolis in 1833 and established a stove, tinware and coppersmith business. One of his first artistic opportunities came when he painted a banner for the presidential campaign of William Henry Harrison in 1840. After that, he began to paint portraits and in 1842 went to Cincinnati to open a studio with John Dunn, a former treasurer of the State of Indiana. After five months, he returned to his business in Indianapolis and continued painting as a sideline, exhibiting annually at the shows of the Cincinnati Art Union. By 1860, he was devoted to art full-time and became well known in Indianapolis for his portraits and landscapes.

Cox was also a teacher with numerous students including William Merritt Chase.

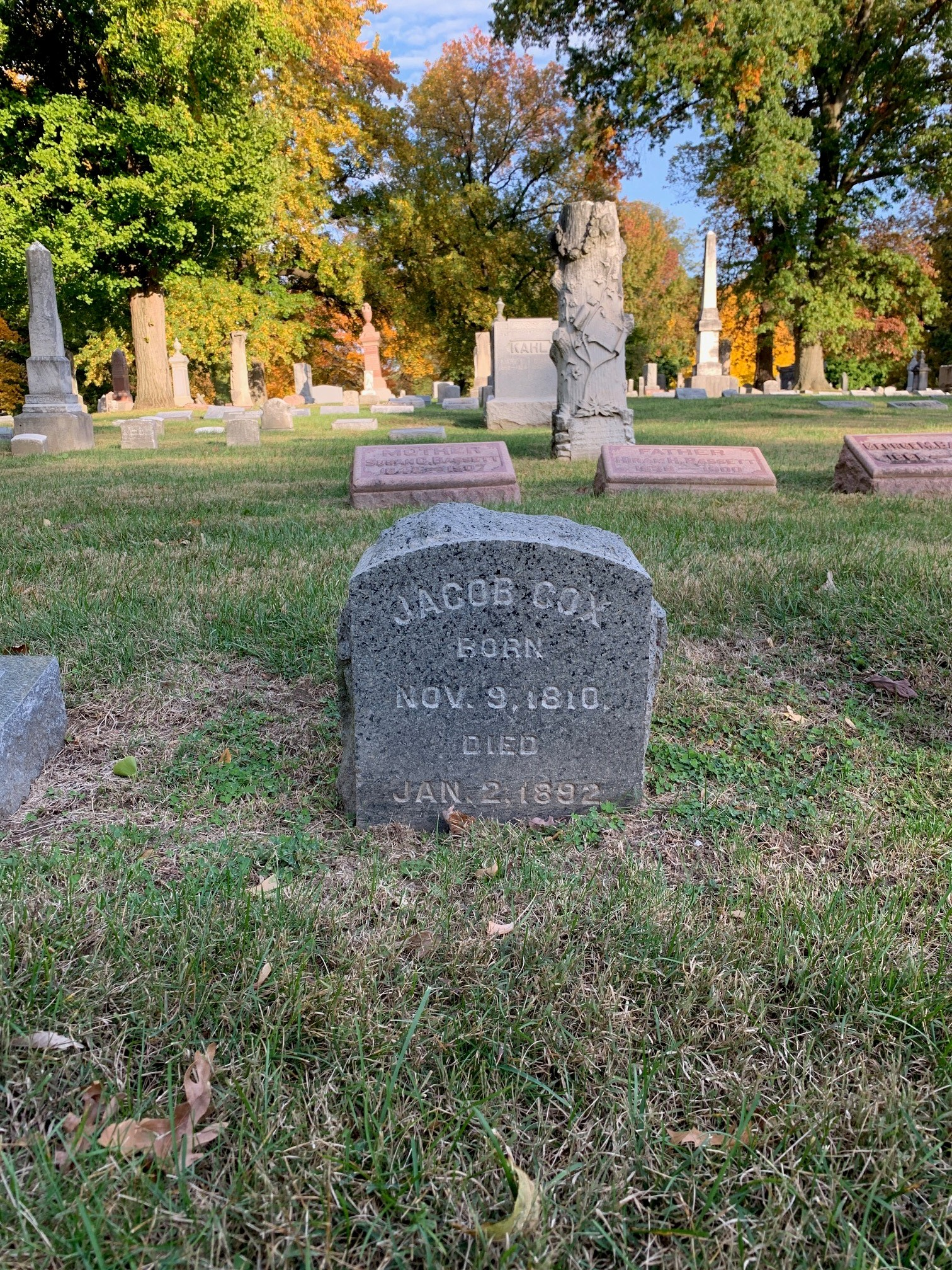
Jacob Cox's tombstone at Crown Hill Cemetery and Arboretum

== Public collections ==
Paintings by Cox can be found in a number of public collections including:

- Indianapolis Museum of Art
- Morris-Butler House
- Indiana Landmarks
- Indiana State Museum
- Benjamin Harrison Home
