= Old Northside Historic District =

Historic district in Indiana, United States

- U.S. National Register of Historic Places
- U.S. Historic district
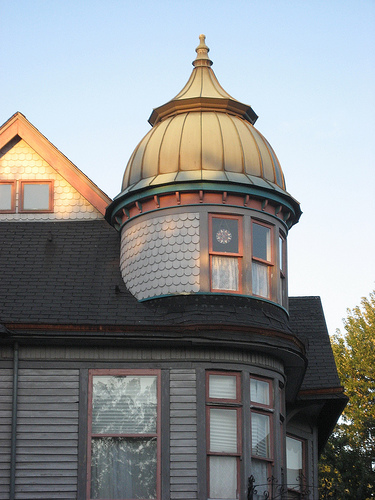
- Old Northside Architecture

- Location within Indianapolis Location within Indiana Location within the United States
- Location: Roughly bounded by Interstate 65 and 16th, Bellefontaine, and Pennsylvania Streets, Indianapolis, Indiana
- Coordinates: 39°47′1.87″N 86°9′14.98″W
- Area: 170 acres (69 ha)
- Architectural style: Late Victorian
- NRHP reference No.: 78000049
- Added to NRHP: March 24, 1978

Old Northside is a residential neighborhood near downtown in Indianapolis, Indiana. It is bordered by 16th Street on the north, Pennsylvania Street on the west, Interstate I-65 on the south, and Bellefontaine Street on the east. The Monon Trail runs along the eastern edge of The Frank and Judy O'Bannon Old Northside Soccer Park.

Old Northside was added to the National Register of Historic Places in 1978 and is home to many residences from the Victorian era.

== History ==
Old Northside was a prominent residential neighborhood in the late 19th century, when many of Indianapolis' wealthier residents built mansions in the area. Old Northside was home to Benjamin Harrison (23rd President of the United States), Ovid Butler (founder of Butler University) and other notable figures, including magnates of the L.S. Ayres department store. Indiana author Meredith Nicholson was also a resident for many years and wrote his most noted work House of a Thousand Candles while in residence.

Old Northside was also the original location of Indianapolis' Butler University, then named North Western Christian University, which was later relocated to the town of Irvington.

The neighborhood began a slow decline in the early 1910s as architectural tastes changed and families built homes further north in Indianapolis. Over several decades, homes were demolished and others fell into disrepair.

In 1937, the Homeowner Loan Corporation (HOLC) classified 73 Indianapolis neighborhoods into four categories based on perceived investment risk. The Old Northside was graded "C", or hazardous, and colored yellow, and was surrounded by redlined neighborhoods. In the late 1960s, residents began restoring remaining buildings of architectural significance, and petitioned the city for historic recognition. By the 1990s, the Old Northside was gentrified, with the population of white residents more than doubling between 1970 and 2016.

Old Northside received historic designation in late 1978 after adopting a plan for preserving the architecture and history of the neighborhood. Disagreement arose between those seeking National Register designation and lower-income residents of the Old Northside, who were represented by the Citizens Neighborhood Coalition and feared displacement from their homes. A 1979 IUPUI study determined that minimal displacement had taken place due to the historic preservation of the neighborhood.

Preservation of the neighborhood's history is overseen by the Indianapolis Historic Preservation Commission.

== Residences and museums ==
The President Benjamin Harrison Home and the Morris-Butler House, both on the National Register of Historic Places, are located in Old Northside and are open to the public for tours and special events. In 2010–2011, the former Central Avenue Methodist Church, later known as the Old Centrum, underwent a multimillion-dollar major restoration as a performance venue and statewide headquarters of Indiana Landmarks and is now known as the Indiana Landmarks Center. The former home of Thomas Taggart is now the national headquarters of Delta Sigma Phi fraternity.

== Parks ==
There are three parks related to Old Northside, all created with funding from the Old Northside Foundation. Great Oak Commons is a park created by the neighborhood from several empty lots and is landscaped as a Victorian walking park with a central fountain, gas lighting, a gazebo and a sensory garden filled with fragrant perennial flowers. Shawn Grove Park is a children's park with play equipment. The Frank and Judy O'Bannon Soccer Park was created by the city of Indianapolis on the east edge of the neighborhood, with the help of Old Northside Foundation. It is now maintained by Indy Parks. It was reclaimed from abandoned space near the former Monon train tracks and is used by several children's summer soccer leagues.

== Neighborhood organizations ==
The Old Northside Neighborhood Association was created in 1979, and has been active in preserving the historic architecture of the neighborhood and providing cultural and social activities for the neighborhood.

The Old Northside Neighborhood Foundation was created in 1990 to raise funds for neighborhood projects, including funding for the neighborhood parks and conversion of street lights to historically appropriate designs.

== Gallery ==
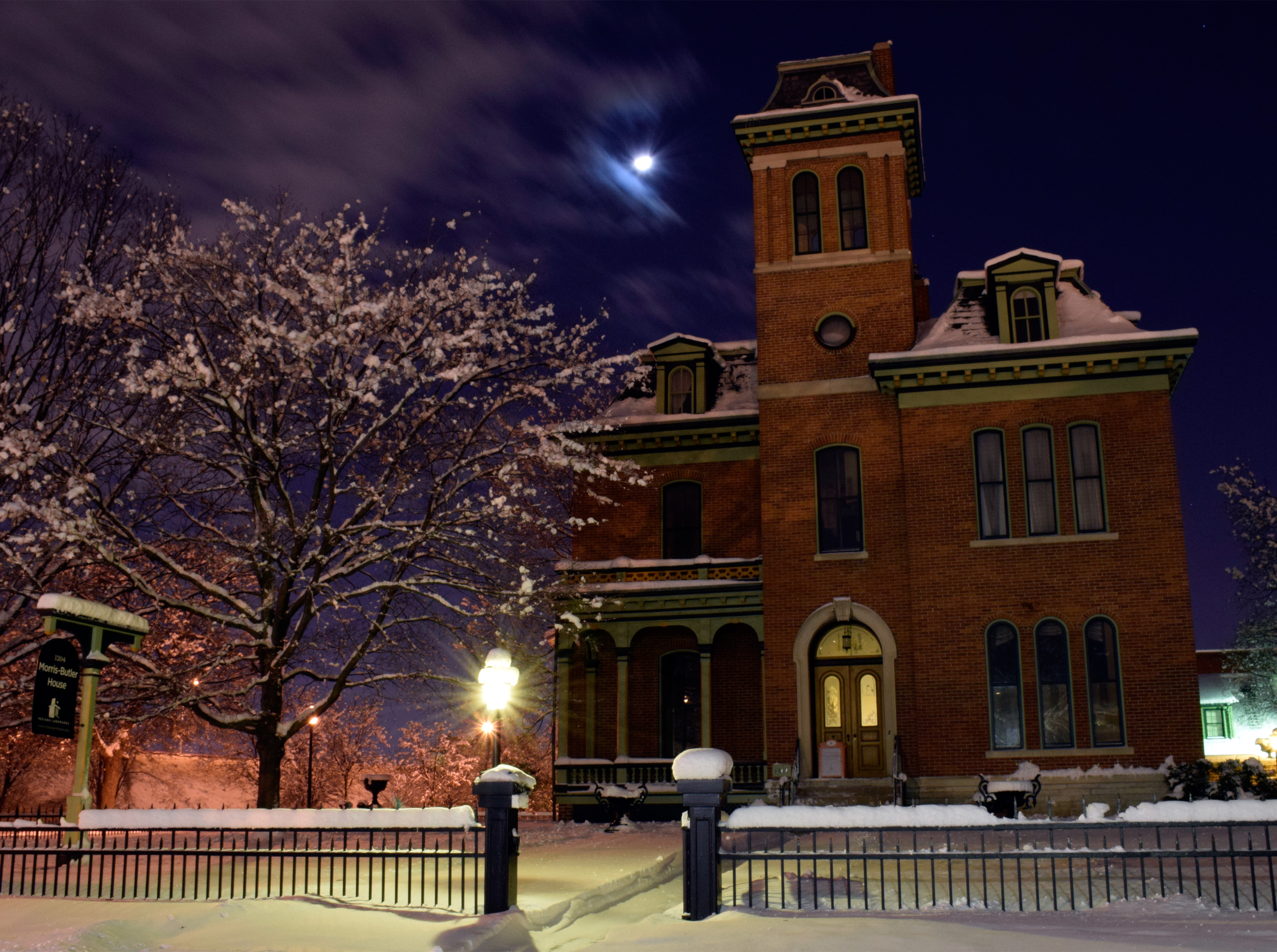
Morris–Butler House (1864)

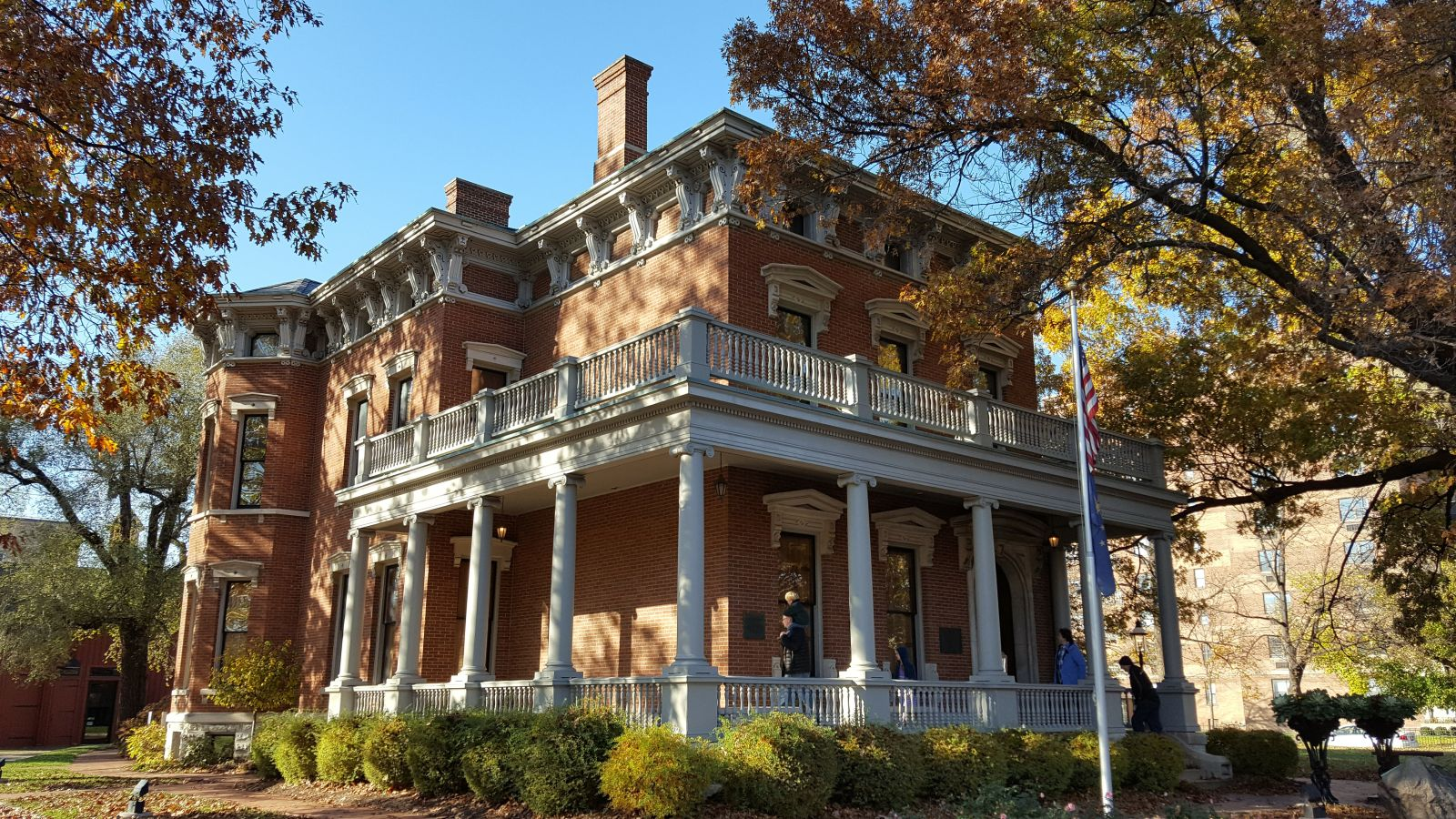
Benjamin Harrison Presidential Site (1875)

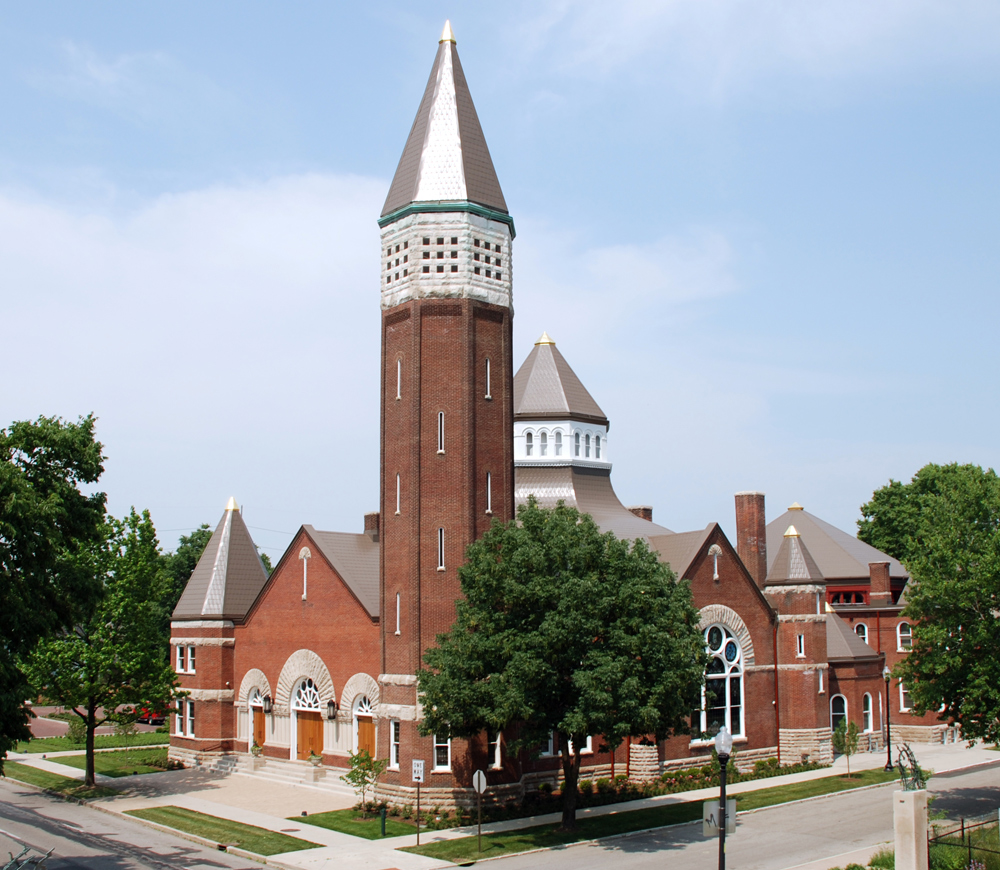
Indiana Landmarks Center (1891)

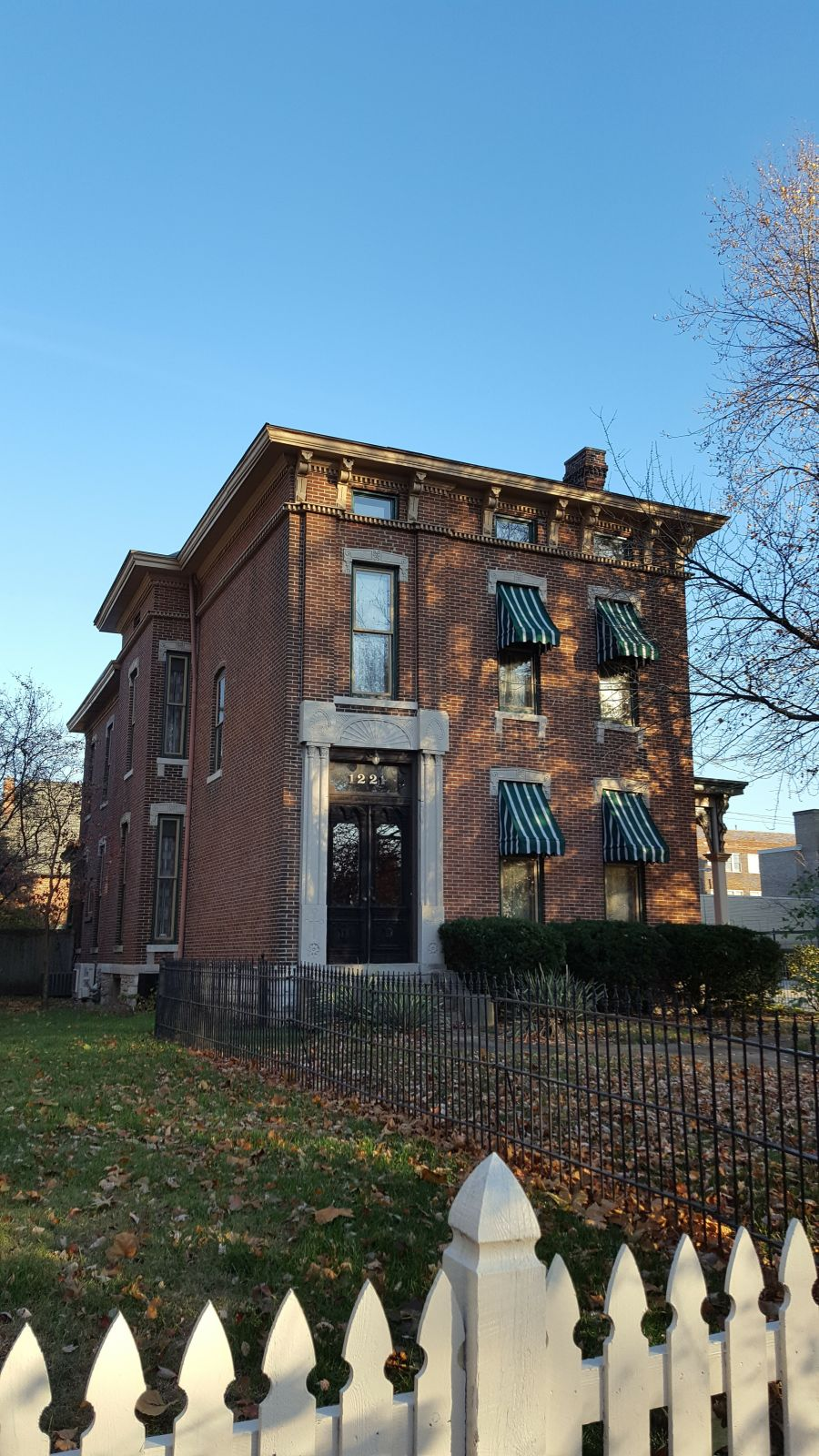
1221 N. Delaware Street

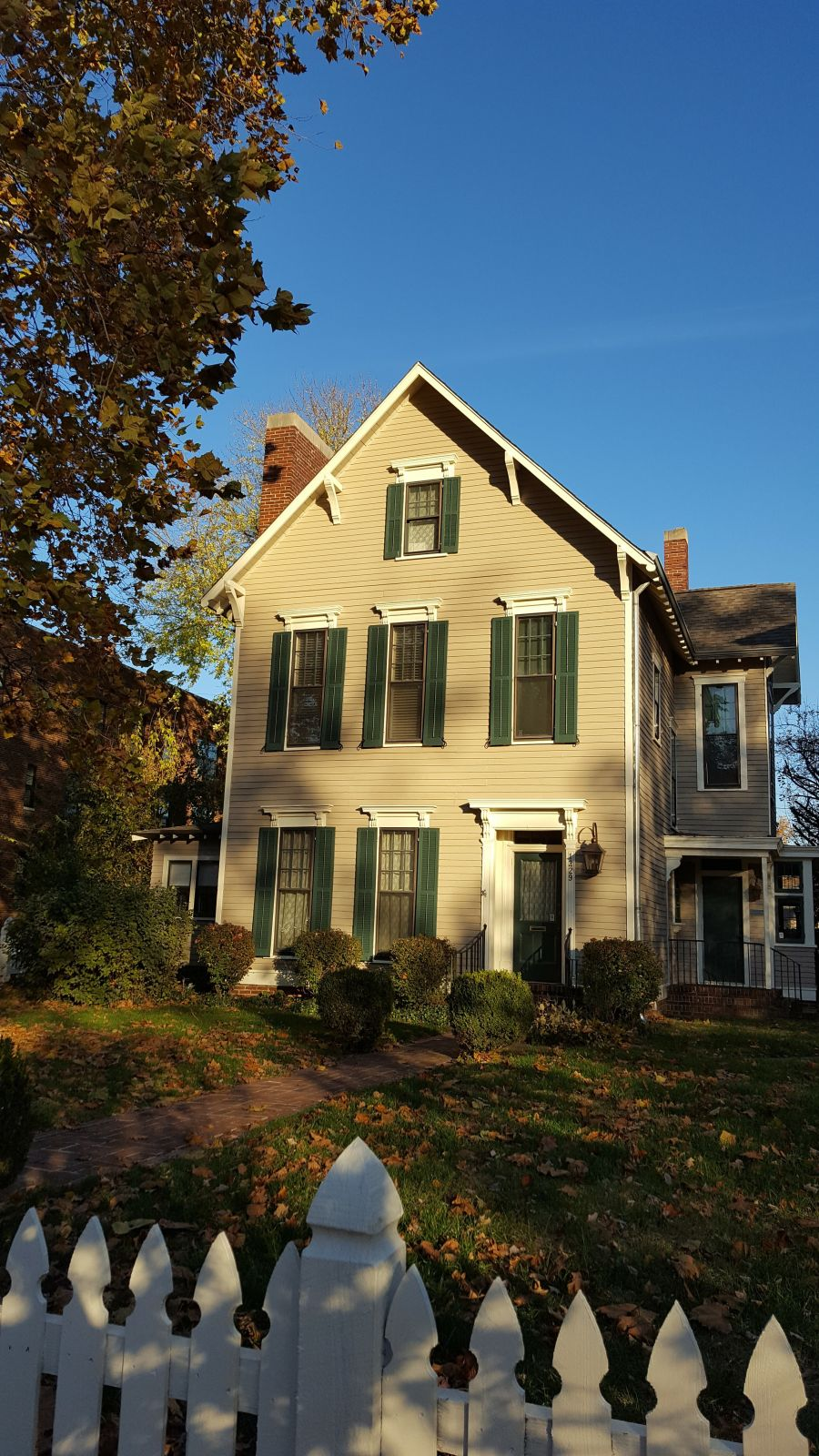
1229 N. Delaware Street

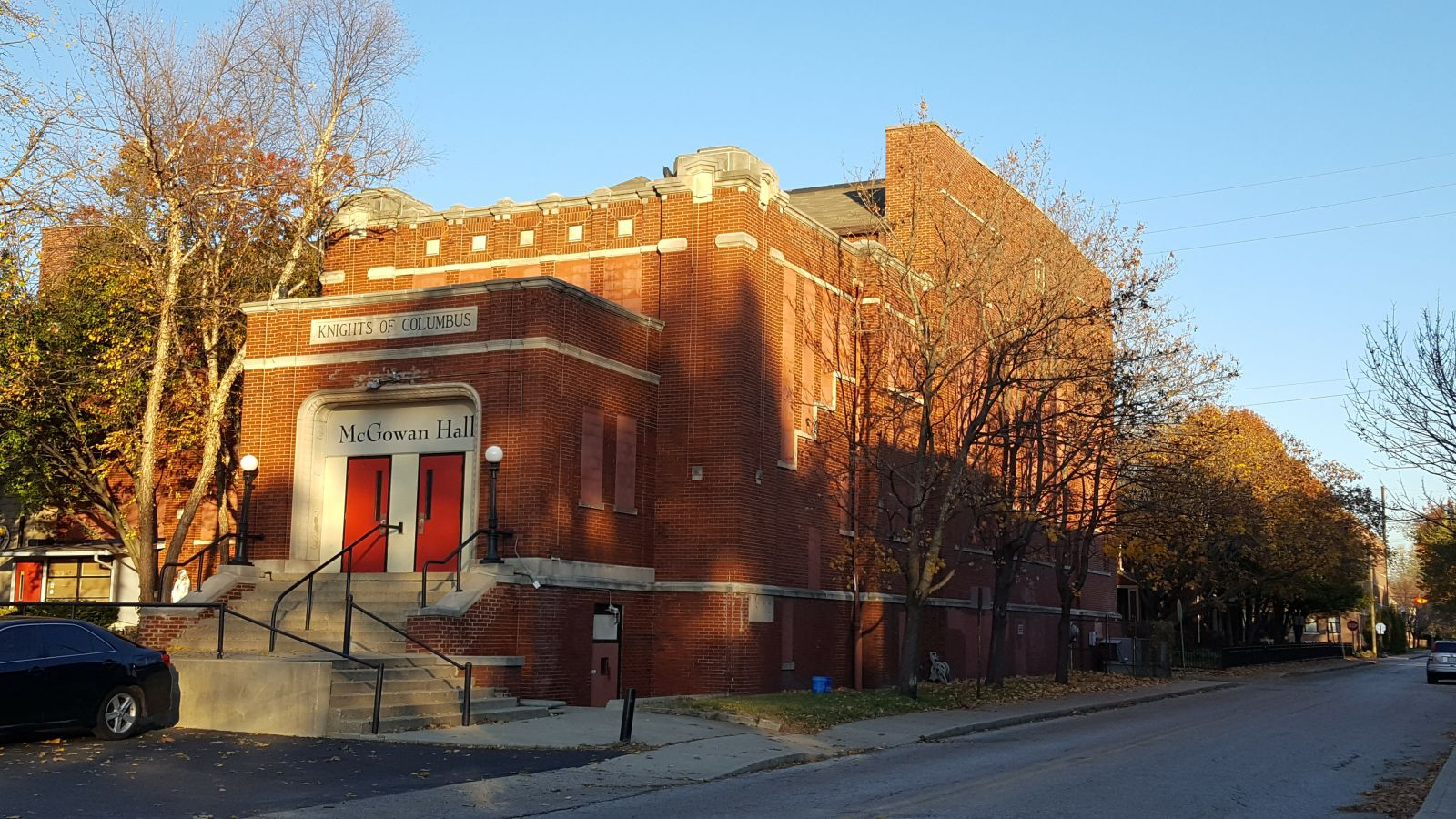
Knights of Columbus McGowan Hall

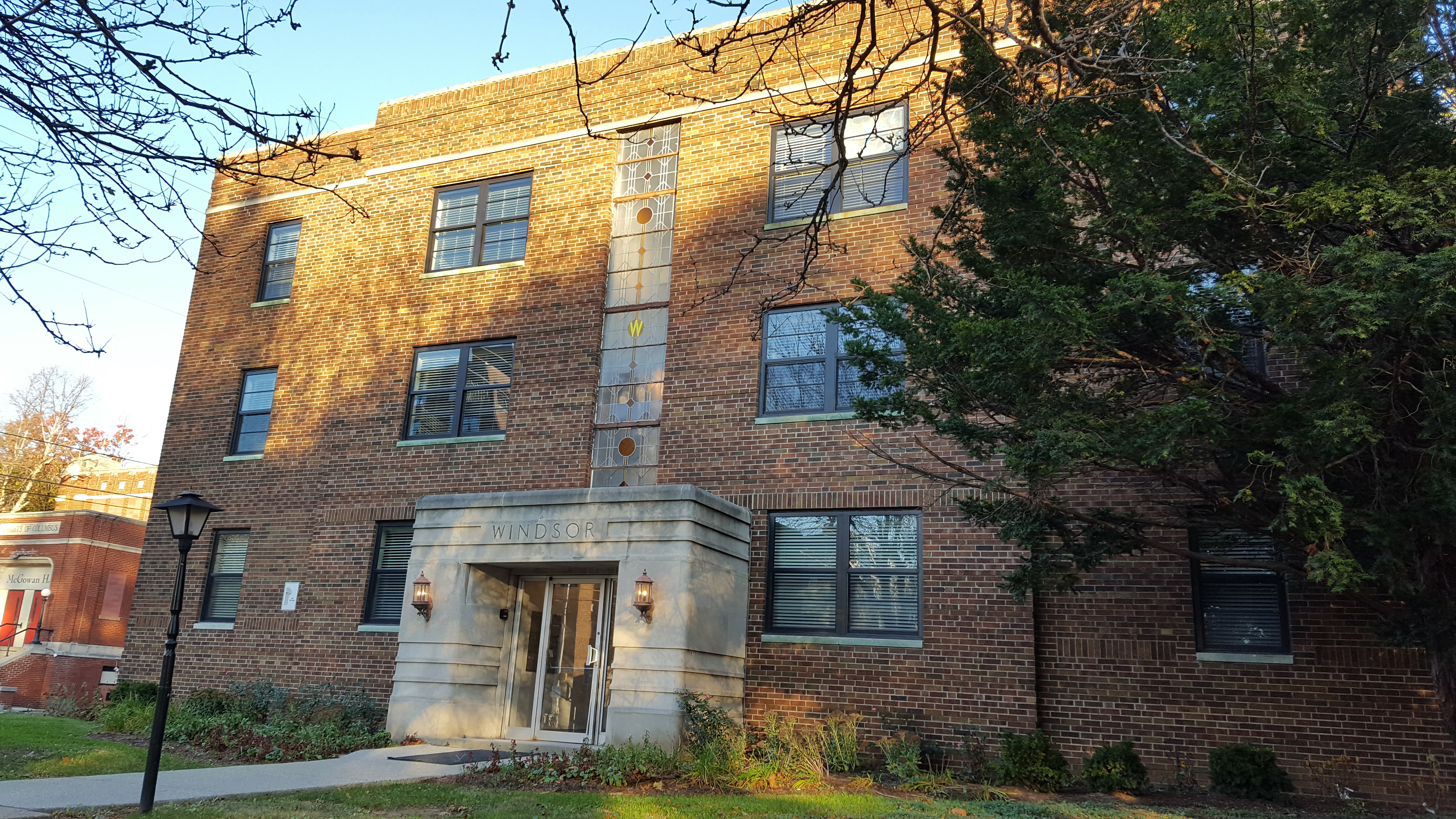
Windsor Apartments

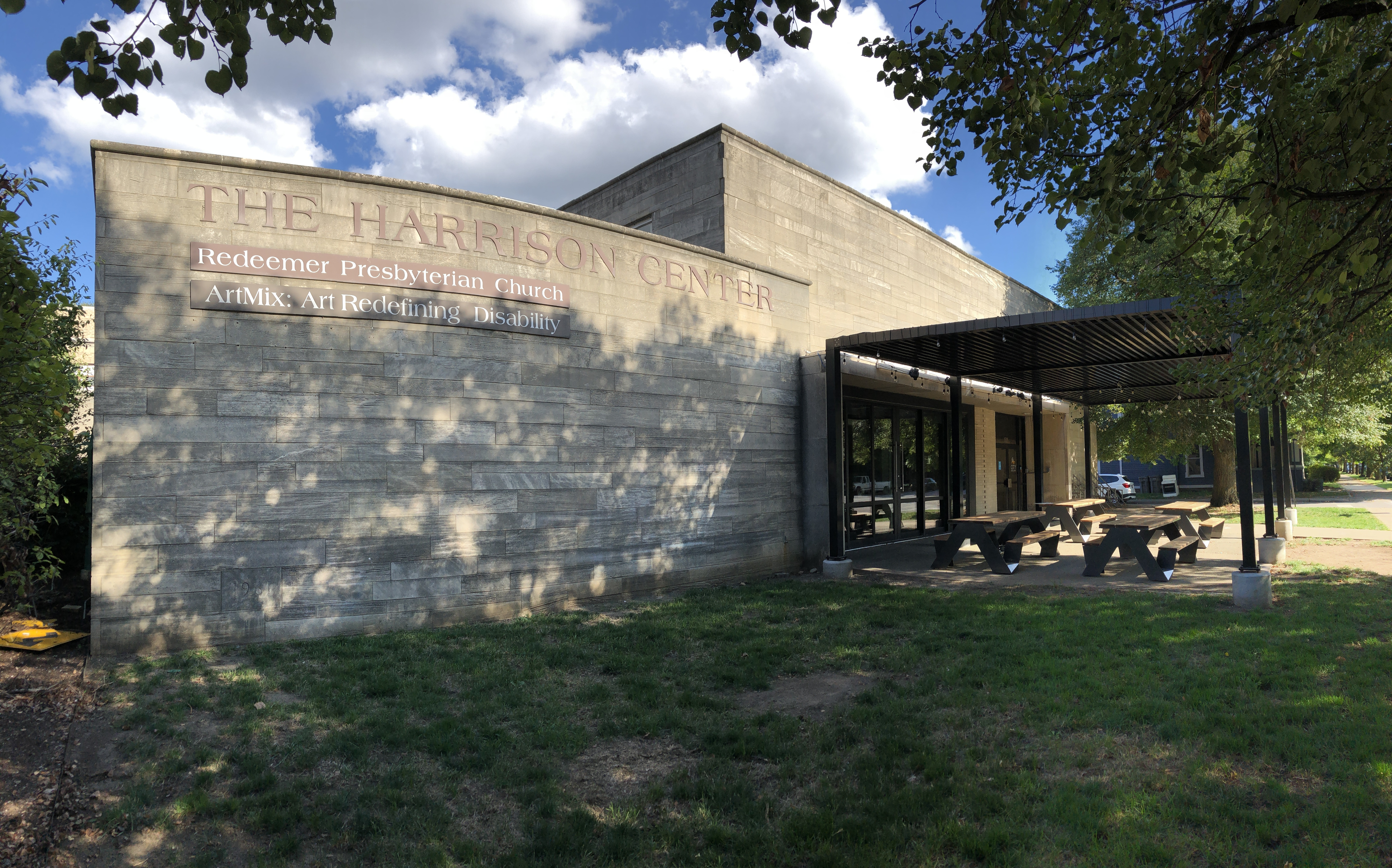
Harrison Center

== See also ==
- List of neighborhoods in Indianapolis
- National Register of Historic Places listings in Center Township, Marion County, Indiana
