= Stinesville, Indiana =

- Town
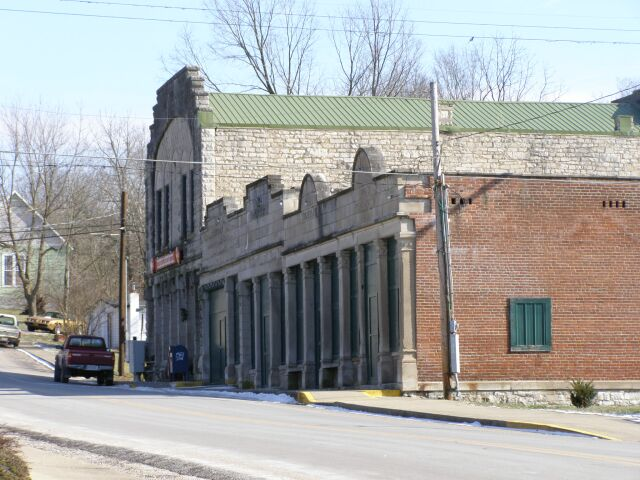
- Downtown Stinesville

- Seal
- Motto: "The Town of History"
- Location in Monroe County, Indiana
- Coordinates: 39°18′00″N 86°39′00″W
- Country: United States
- State: Indiana
- County: Monroe
- Township: Bean Blossom
- Founded: 1855

Area
  - Total: 0.11 sq mi (0.29 km^{2})
  - Land: 0.11 sq mi (0.29 km^{2})
  - Water: 0 sq mi (0.00 km^{2})
- Elevation: 630 ft (190 m)

Population (2020)
  - Total: 203
  - Density: 1,831.2/sq mi (707.04/km^{2})
- Time zone: UTC-5 (Eastern (EST))
  - Summer (DST): UTC-4 (EDT)
- ZIP code: 47464
- Area codes: 812, 930
- FIPS code: 18-73232
- GNIS feature ID: 2397683
- Website: www.in.gov/towns/stinesville/

Stinesville is a town in Bean Blossom Township, Monroe County, in the U.S. state of Indiana. The population was 203 at the 2020 census. It is part of the Bloomington Metropolitan Statistical Area.

== History ==
Stinesville was platted in 1855 when the New Albany and Salem Railroad was extended to that point. The town was named for Eusebius Stine, the original owner of the town site. A post office has been in operation at Stinesville since 1860.

Stinesville Commercial Historic District was listed on the National Register of Historic Places in 1995.

== Geography ==
Stinesville is located in northwestern Monroe County approximately 5 miles (8 km) north of Ellettsville and 14 miles (23 km) northwest of Bloomington, the county seat.

According to the U.S. Census Bureau, Stinesville has a total area of 0.11 square miles (0.28 km^{2}), all land. The town sits on the east side of Jacks Defeat Creek and its valley, which flows northeast 1 mile (1.6 km) to Beanblossom Creek, a northwest-flowing tributary of the White River.

== Demographics ==
Historical population
Census	Pop.	Note	%±
1870	140		—
1900	288		—
1910	497		72.6%
1920	299		−39.8%
1930	310		3.7%
1940	337		8.7%
1950	355		5.3%
1960	288		−18.9%
1970	291		1.0%
1980	227		−22.0%
1990	204		−10.1%
2000	194		−4.9%
2010	198		2.1%
2020	203		2.5%
U.S. Decennial Census

As of the 2000 census, there were 194 people, 67 households, and 48 families residing in the town. The population density was 1,783.8 inhabitants per square mile (688.7/km^{2}). There were 94 housing units at an average density of 864.3 per square mile (333.7/km^{2}). The racial makeup of the town was 95.88% White, 2.58% Asian, and 1.55% from two or more races.

There were 67 households, out of which 32.8% had children under the age of 18 living with them, 55.2% were married couples living together, 11.9% had a female householder with no husband present, and 26.9% were non-families. 25.4% of all households were made up of individuals, and 16.4% had someone living alone who was 65 years of age or older. The average household size was 2.90 and the average family size was 3.35.

In the town, the population was spread out, with 30.9% under the age of 18, 6.2% from 18 to 24, 29.9% from 25 to 44, 22.7% from 45 to 64, and 10.3% who were 65 years of age or older. The median age was 36 years. For every 100 females, there were 96.0 males. For every 100 females age 18 and over, there were 91.4 males.

The median income for a household in the town was $31,875, and the median income for a family was $36,875. Males had a median income of $26,667 versus $15,000 for females. The per capita income for the town was $11,411. None of the families and 1.0% of the population were living below the poverty line, including no under eighteens and 7.4% of those over 64.
