= Morris–Butler House =

Historic house in Indiana, United States

- U.S. National Register of Historic Places
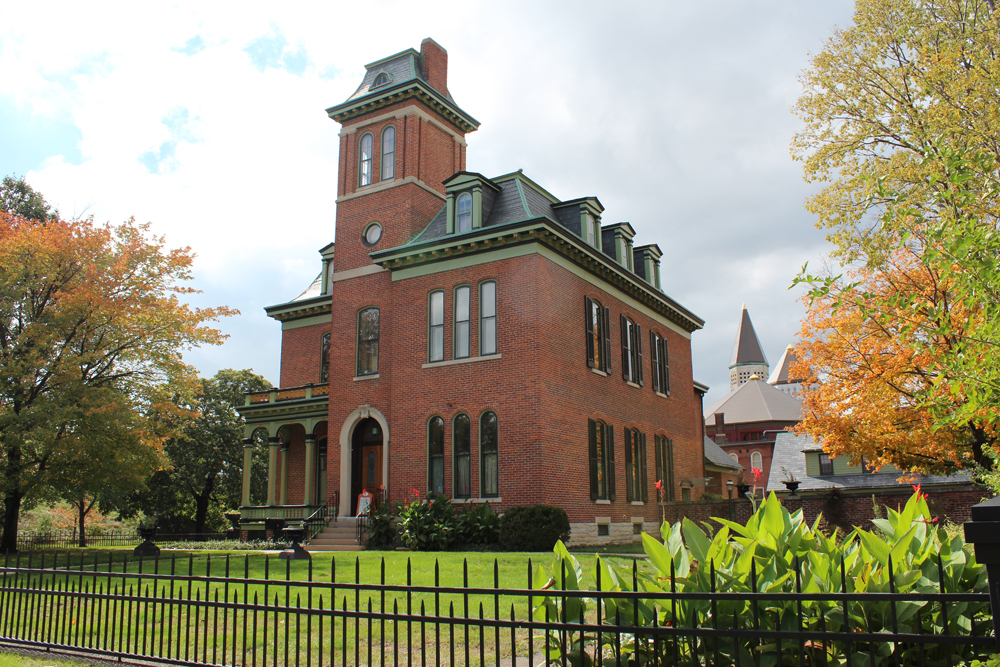

- Location within Indianapolis Location within Indiana Location within the United States
- Location: Indianapolis, Indiana
- Coordinates: 39°46′59.8″N 86°8′52.6″W
- Built: 1864
- Architect: D.A. Bohlen
- Architectural style: Second Empire
- NRHP reference No.: 73000037
- Added to NRHP: February 20, 1973

The Morris–Butler House is a Second Empire-style house built about 1864 in the Old Northside Historic District of Indianapolis, Indiana. Restored as a museum home by Indiana Landmarks between 1964 and 1969, the American Civil War-era residence was the non-profit organization's first preservation project. Restoration work retained some of its original architectural features, and the home was furnished in Victorian and Post-Victorian styles. Its use was changed to a venue for Indiana Landmarks programs, special events, and private rentals following a refurbishment in 2013. Regular daily tours of the property have been discontinued.

== History ==
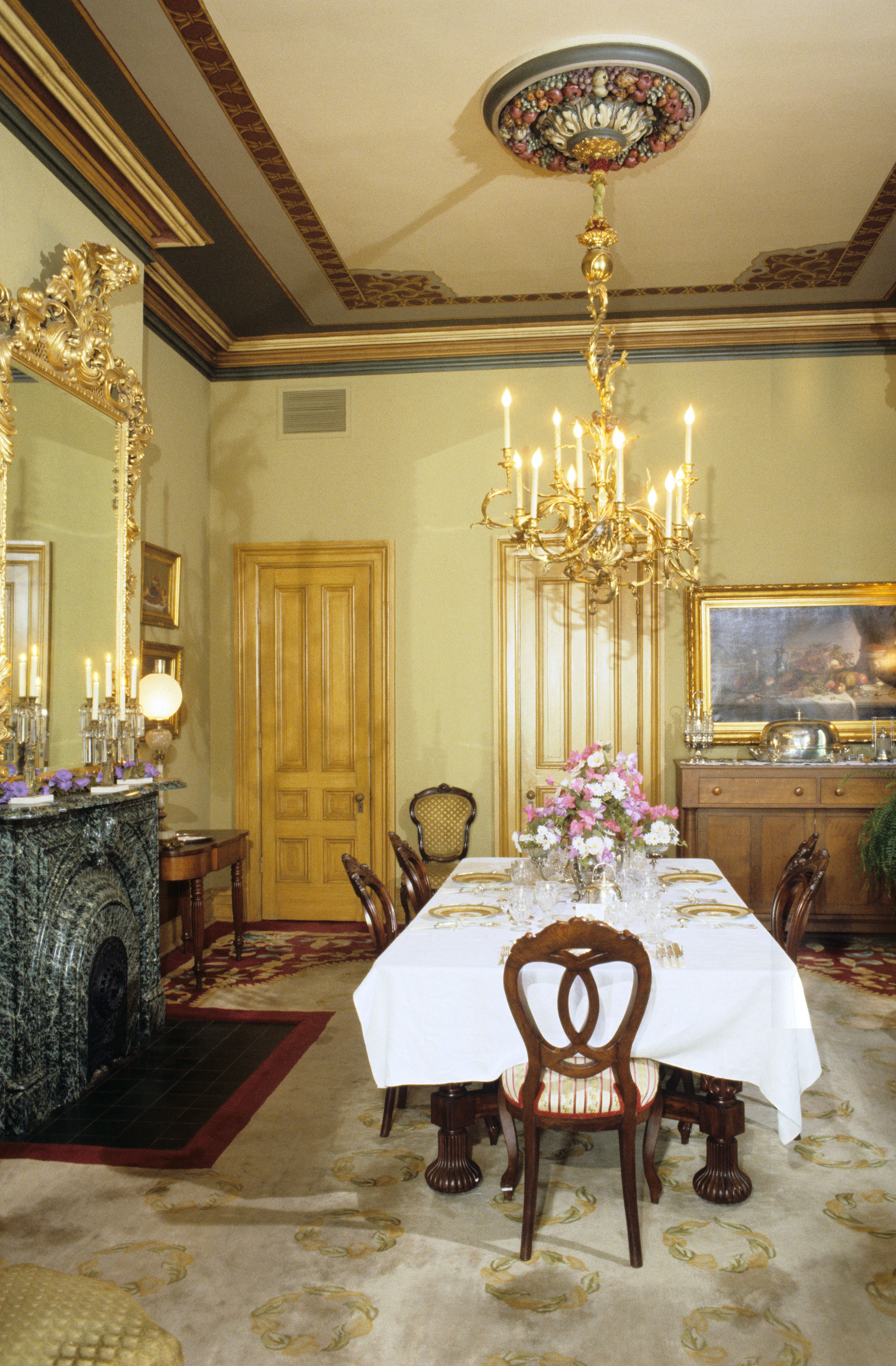
Morris–Butler House Interior

=== Private residence ===
The house was built about 1864 for John D. Morris, an Indianapolis businessman, who was the son of Morris Morris, an Indianapolis settler. It is believed that the home was designed by noted Indianapolis architect Diedrich A. Bohlen. The house is located in what was then a suburb of Indianapolis, an area now known as the Old Northside Historic District. Morris lived in the house with his family until the 1870s, when the family experienced financial difficulties. In 1878 he sold the house to Noble Chase Butler, a bankruptcy lawyer and clerk of the United States District Court in Indianapolis. Butler lived in the house with his wife and seven children until his death in 1933. Butler's daughter, Florence, lived in the house until her death on January 7, 1957. By that time the neighborhood was quite different. Most of the homes were low-income rentals and many suffered from neglect. The house was briefly used as an artists' studio, gallery, and apartments between 1957 and 1964.

=== Historic house museum ===
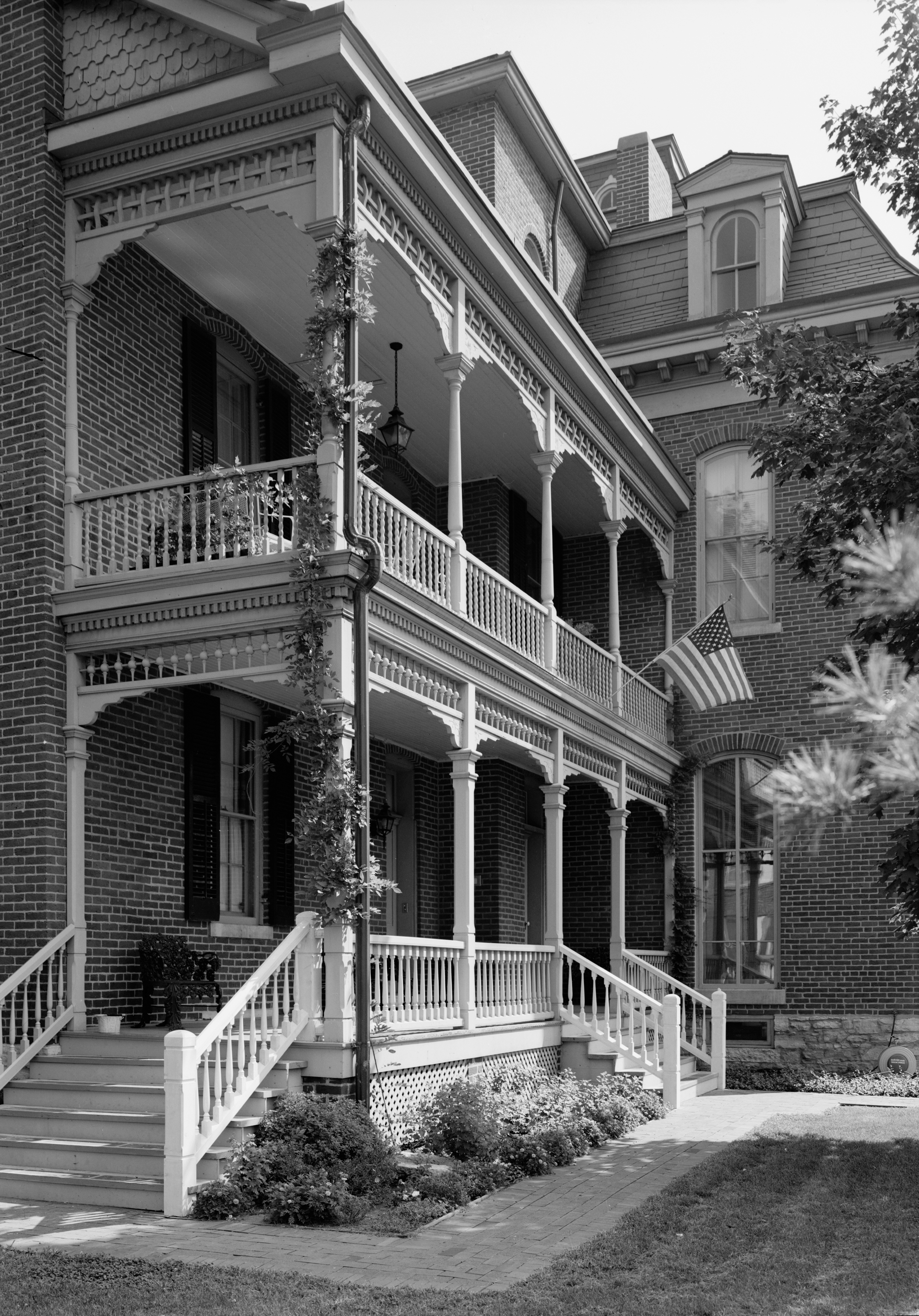
HABS photo

With funds from Eli Lilly, Historic Landmarks Foundation of Indiana (now Indiana Landmarks) bought the house in 1963, when it was in danger of being destroyed by the construction of Interstate 70. Lilly had once lived on North Delaware Street, about a block away from the Morris–Butler House, with his first wife, Evelyn Fortune Lilly, in the 1920s. He also had known Florence Butler. Lilly provided $22,500 to purchase the house and additional funds for restoration. The home, named after the two families who once resided there, was Historic Landmarks Foundation's first historic preservation project.

Architect H. Roll McLaughlin, A.I.A., of James Associates and a president of Indiana Landmarks, headed the restoration. Work included repairing warped floors, cleaning and repainting the darkened brickwork, and adding a new slate roof. The house was opened to the public as a historic home and decorative arts museum in May 1969. Its interiors were furnished and decorated in Victorian-era furnishings, along with a few reproductions. Notable furnishing included a Wooton desk, paintings by Hoosier artist Jacob Cox, and Charles Eastlake chairs. Indiana Landmarks staffed the house with tour guides, coordinated further restoration, and hosted educational and cultural events. Morris–Butler House was added to the National Register of Historic Places in 1972.

=== Refurbished as event space ===
Refurbishments to the house made during 2012 and 2013 included general repairs, painting, improvements to its landscape, and interior updates. Its use was changed from a house museum to a venue for Indiana Landmarks programs, special events, and event rentals. Daily tours of the property have been discontinued.

== Description ==
The Second Empire-style home, with overall dimensions are 46 feet (14 m) by 71.83 feet (21.89 m), is located the corner of North Park Avenue and East 12th Street, north of downtown Indianapolis, adjacent to the Indiana Landmark Center and a part of its campus complex. The exterior features a French mansard roof of gray slate, a white limestone foundation, red brick walls, a four-story tower, and a limestone arch at the main entrance. The home has two main stories in addition to a cellar, an attic, and the brick tower. It also contains wooden front and side porches, dormers, and cornices. The dwelling's central hall floor plan has a service ell at the rear. A roofed breezeway connects the service ell to a red-brick summer kitchen. The house's projecting window on its south façade and its front porch are surmounted by iron railings. The property also contains a carriage house with living quarters. A black mental fence installed around the perimeter of the landscaped lot is a reproduction.

== See also ==
- Indianapolis Historic Preservation Commission
- National Register of Historic Places listings in Center Township, Marion County, Indiana
