= Stinesville Commercial Historic District =

Historic district in Indiana, United States

- U.S. National Register of Historic Places
- U.S. Historic district
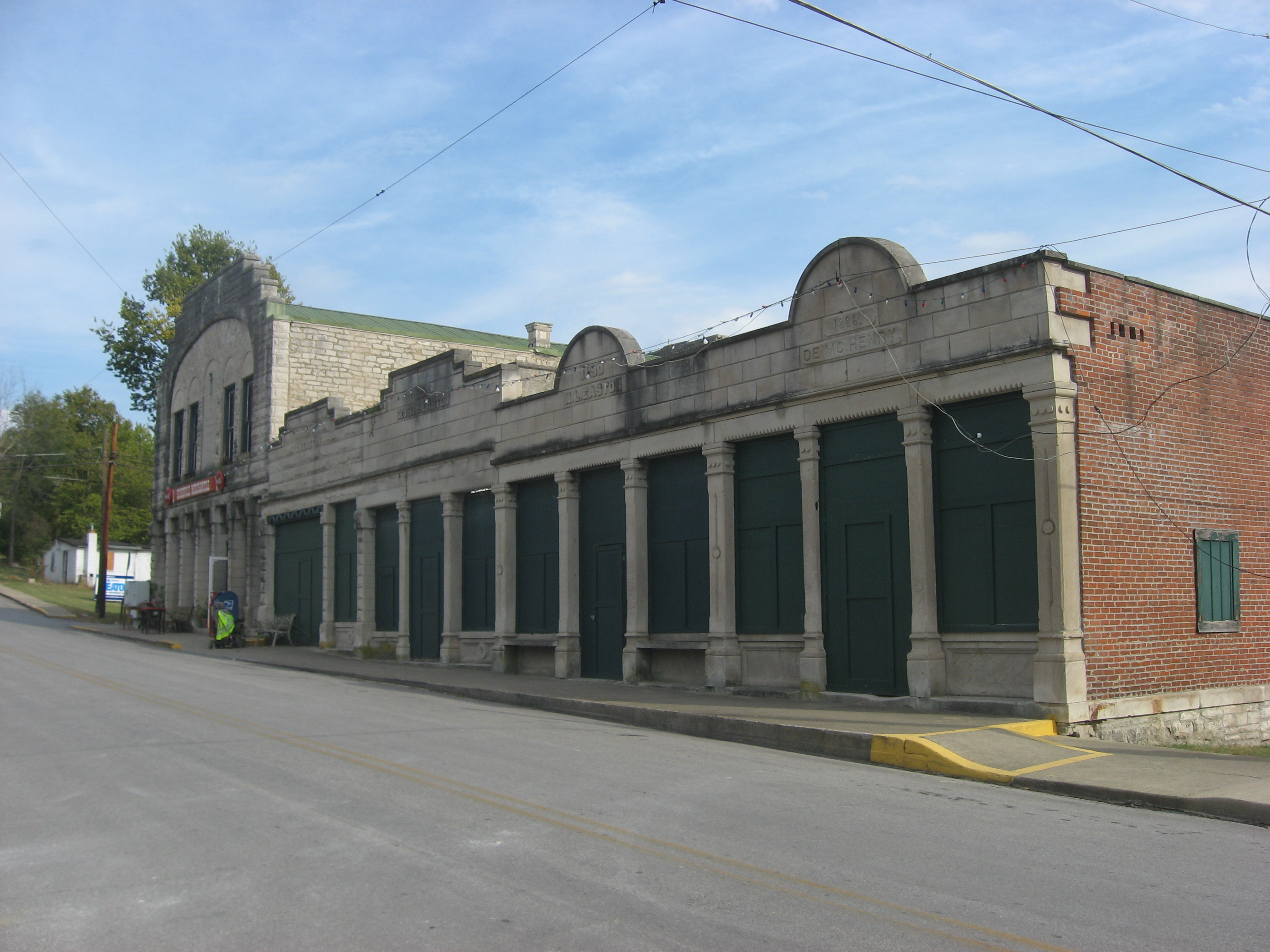
- Stinesville Commercial Historic District, September 2010

- Location within Indiana Location within the United States
- Location: 8201, 8211, 8223, 8231 and 8237 W. Main St., Stinesville, Indiana
- Coordinates: 39°17′55″N 86°39′3″W
- Area: less than one acre
- Built: 1886-1894
- Architectural style: Renaissance Revival, Romanesque Revival
- NRHP reference No.: 95000707
- Added to NRHP: June 8, 1995

Stinesville Commercial Historic District is a national historic district located at Stinesville, Indiana. The district consists of five adjoining limestone commercial buildings in the central business district of Stinesville. The buildings were built between 1886 and 1894, and display elements of Renaissance Revival and Romanesque Revival style architecture. The main building is the two-story, Oolitic Lodge No. 682, I.O.O.F. built in 1894.

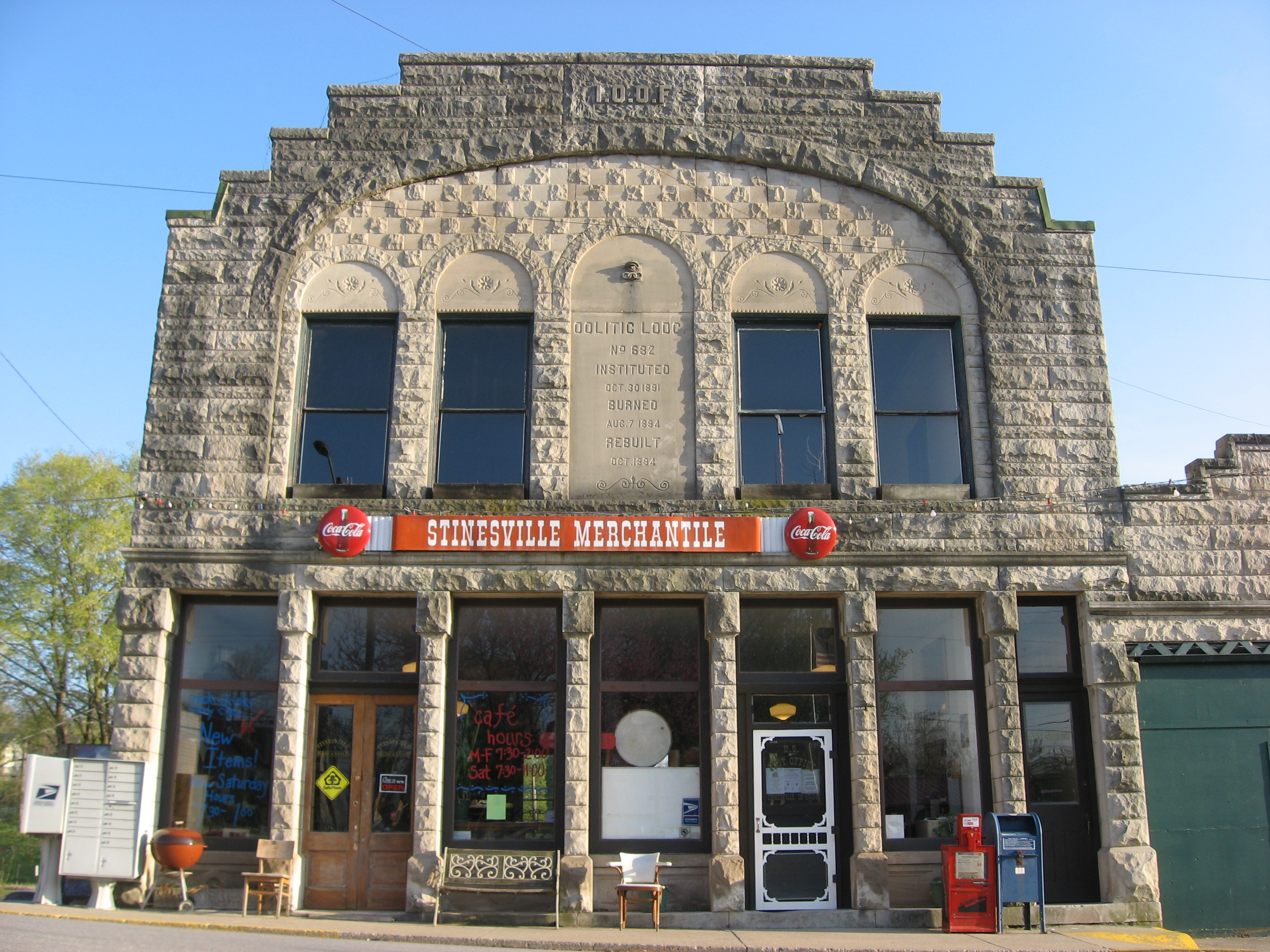
Oolitic Lodge No. 682, I.O.O.F.

It was listed on the National Register of Historic Places in 1995.
