= Rivoli Theater (Indianapolis, Indiana) =

- U.S. National Register of Historic Places
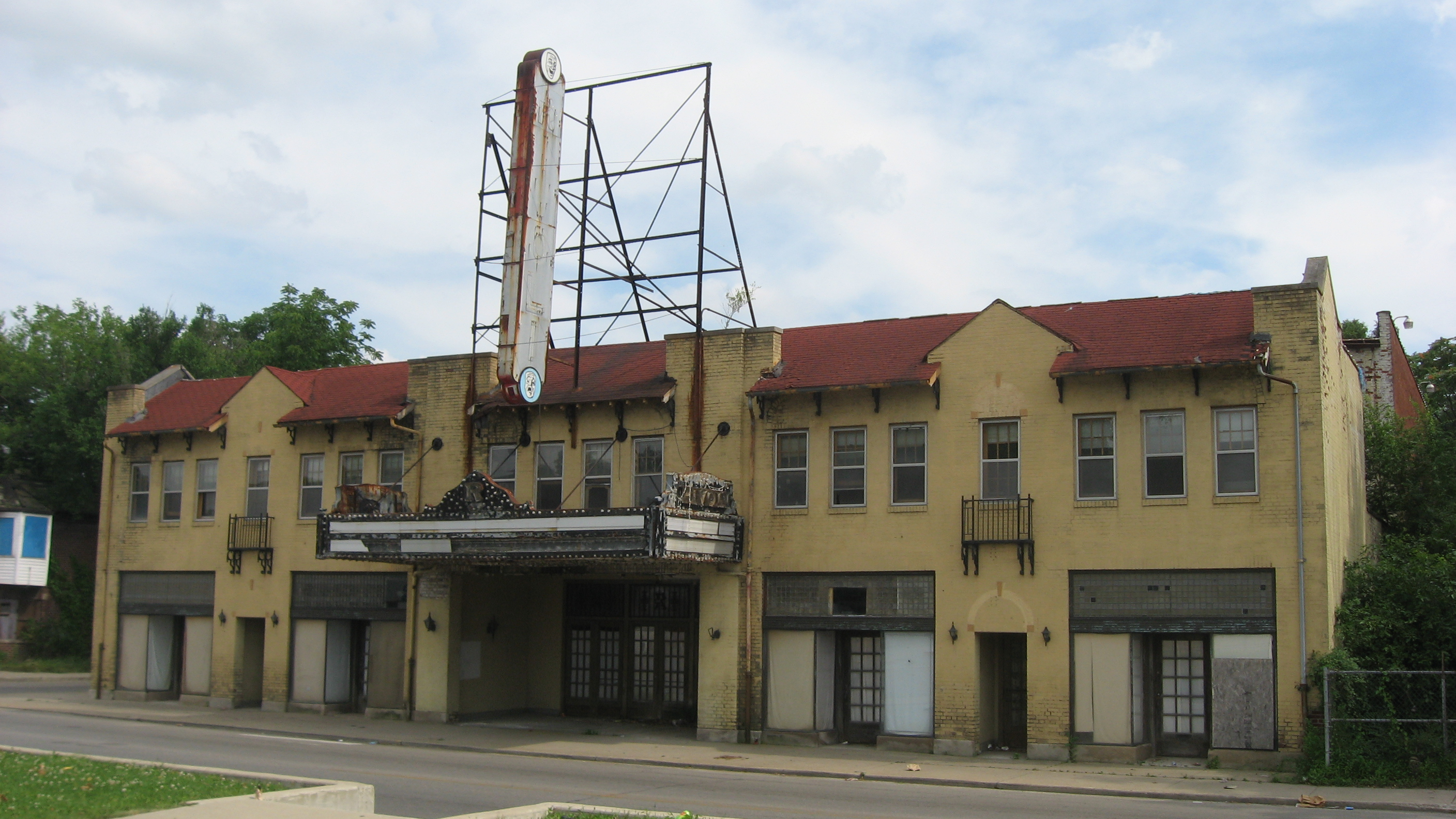
- Front of the theater

- Location within Indianapolis Location within Indiana Location within the United States
- Location: 3155 E. 10th St., Indianapolis, Indiana
- Coordinates: 39°46′52″N 86°6′41″W
- Area: less than one acre
- Built: 1927
- Architect: Henry Ziegler Dietz; D.R. Lederman
- Architectural style: Mission/Spanish Revival
- NRHP reference No.: 04000630
- Added to NRHP: June 22, 2004

The Rivoli Theater is a historic theater on the eastern side of Indianapolis, Indiana, United States. The theater was built in 1927 and was designed by architect Henry Ziegler Dietz. Originally designed and built as a single screen movie theater by Universal Pictures, it was sold in 1937 and continued to provide motion pictures and live entertainment until its final closure in 1992. Since this time the venue has remained largely vacant. In 2007 the Rivoli Theater was acquired by the Rivoli Center for the Performing Arts, Inc., with the intent to restore and reopen the theater.

It was listed on the National Register of Historic Places in 2004.

== See also ==
- National Register of Historic Places listings in Center Township, Marion County, Indiana
