= Attica Downtown Historic District =

Historic district in Indiana, United States

- U.S. National Register of Historic Places
- U.S. Historic district
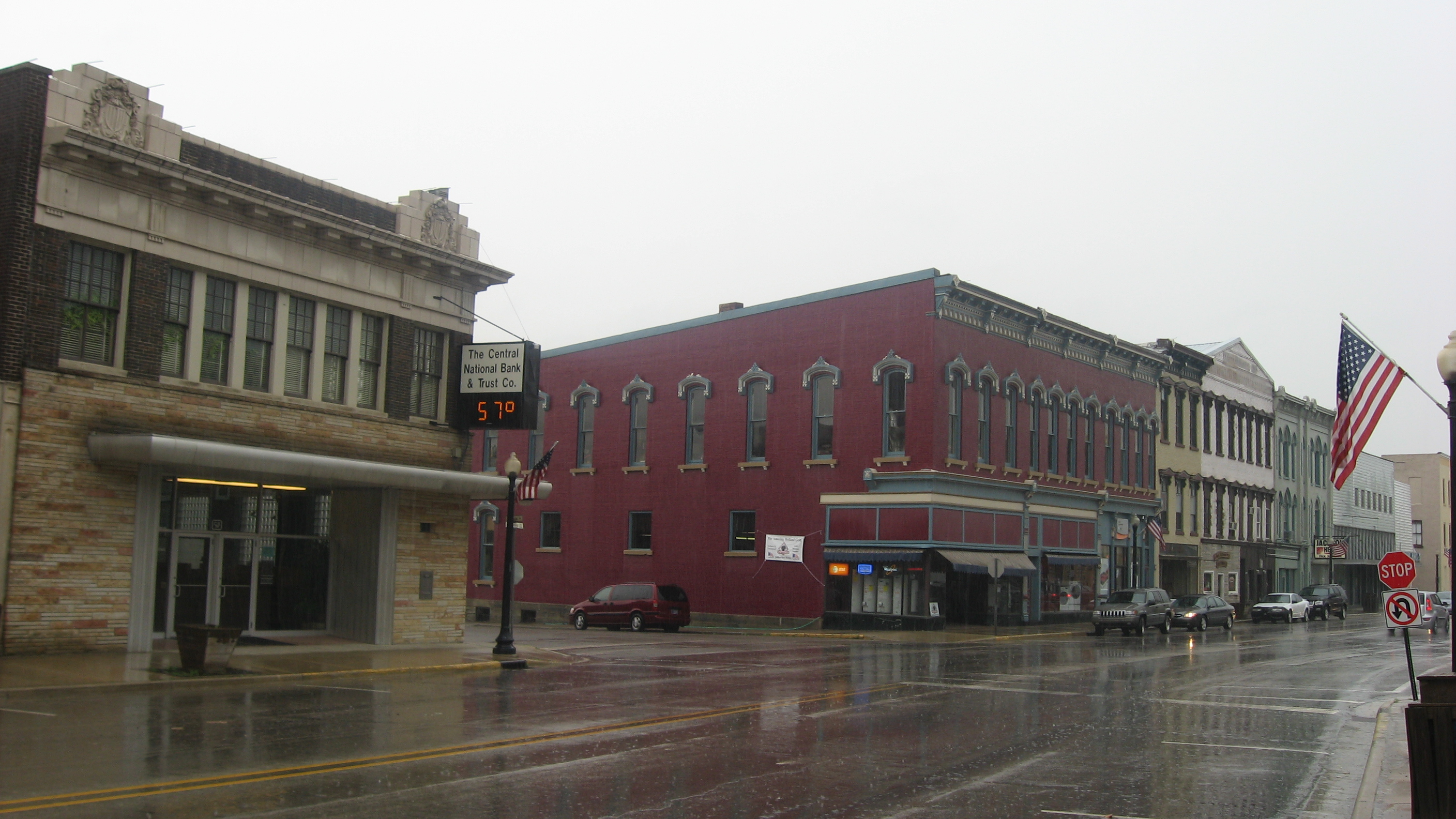
- Attica Downtown Historic District

- Location within Fountain County, Indiana Location within Indiana Location within the United States
- Location: Roughly, Perry St. between Jackson and Ferry Sts. and Main and Mill Sts. between Third and Brady Sts., Attica, Indiana
- Coordinates: 40°17′39″N 87°14′59″W
- Area: 7.5 acres (3.0 ha)
- Architect: Simon, Louis
- Architectural style: Gothic Revival, Art Deco, Classical Revival
- NRHP reference No.: 93000951
- Added to NRHP: September 16, 1993

Attica Downtown Historic District is a national historic district located at Attica, Indiana. The district encompasses 50 contributing buildings in the central business district of Attica. It developed between about 1840 and 1942, and includes notable examples of Art Deco, Gothic Revival, and Classical Revival style architecture. Notable buildings include the U.S. Post Office (1935) designed by the Office of the Supervising Architect under Louis A. Simon, McDonald House (1840), Revere Hotel (1853), and I.O.O.F Building (c. 1870).

It was listed on the National Register of Historic Places in 1993.
