= Hulman Building =

- BPL (Central Union Bank)
- U.S. National Register of Historic Places
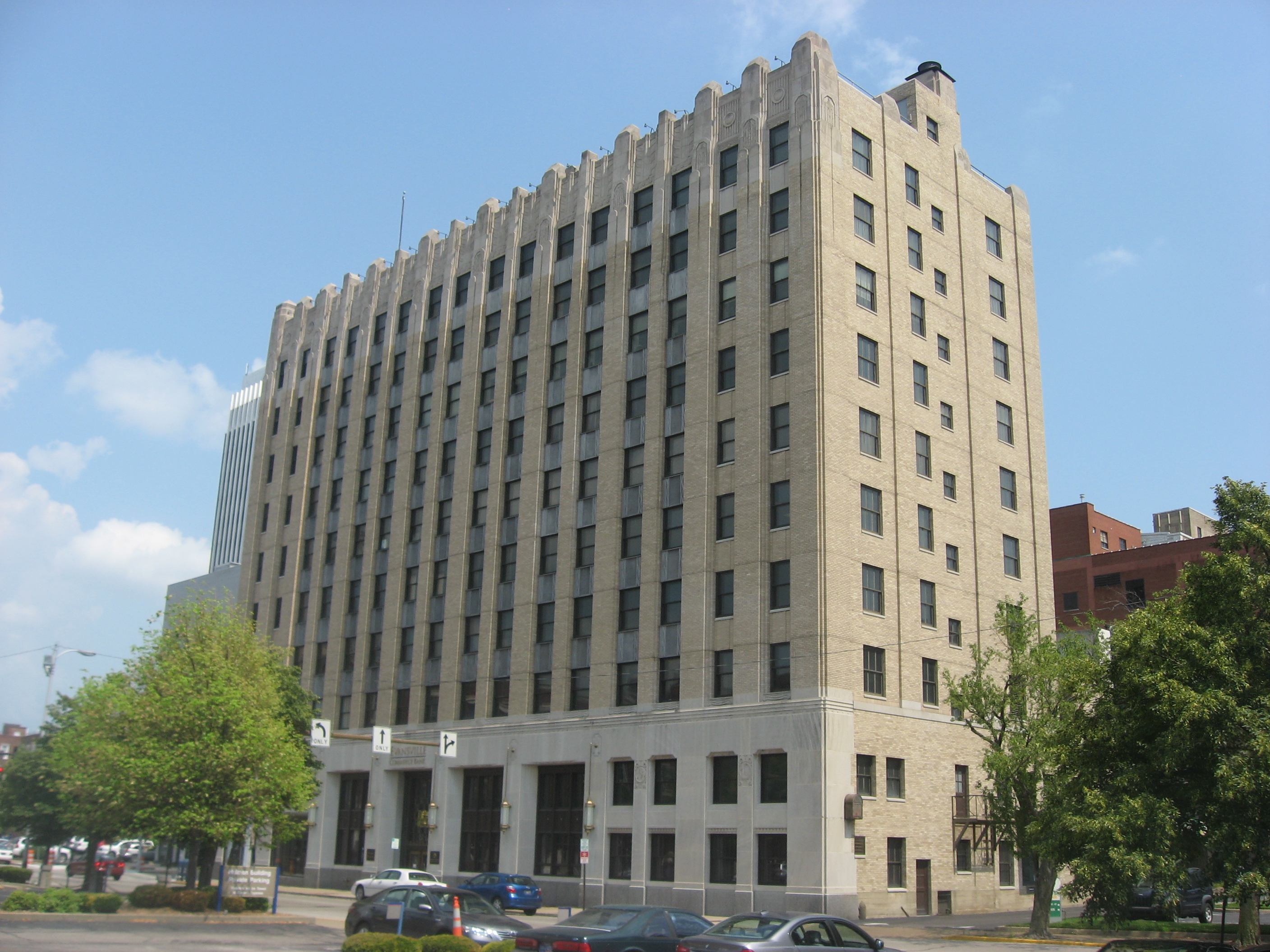
- Comprehensive view

- Location within Indiana Location within the United States
- Location: 20 NW 4th St., Evansville, Indiana
- Coordinates: 37°58′20″N 87°34′19″W
- Area: Less than 1 acre (0.40 ha)
- Built: 1929
- Architect: McGuire & Shook
- Architectural style: Modern Movement, Art Deco
- MPS: Downtown Evansville MRA
- NRHP reference No.: 82000111
- Added to NRHP: July 1, 1982

The Hulman Building (originally Central Union Bank it also became a Morris Plan Bank) is a ten-story art deco high rise in downtown Evansville, Indiana. Construction began in 1928 and was completed in 1930 with a brick facade of light yellow. It was the first of several Art Deco buildings to grace Evansville's skyline.
