= Benjamin Harrison Presidential Site =

Presidential museum in Indianapolis, Indiana, US

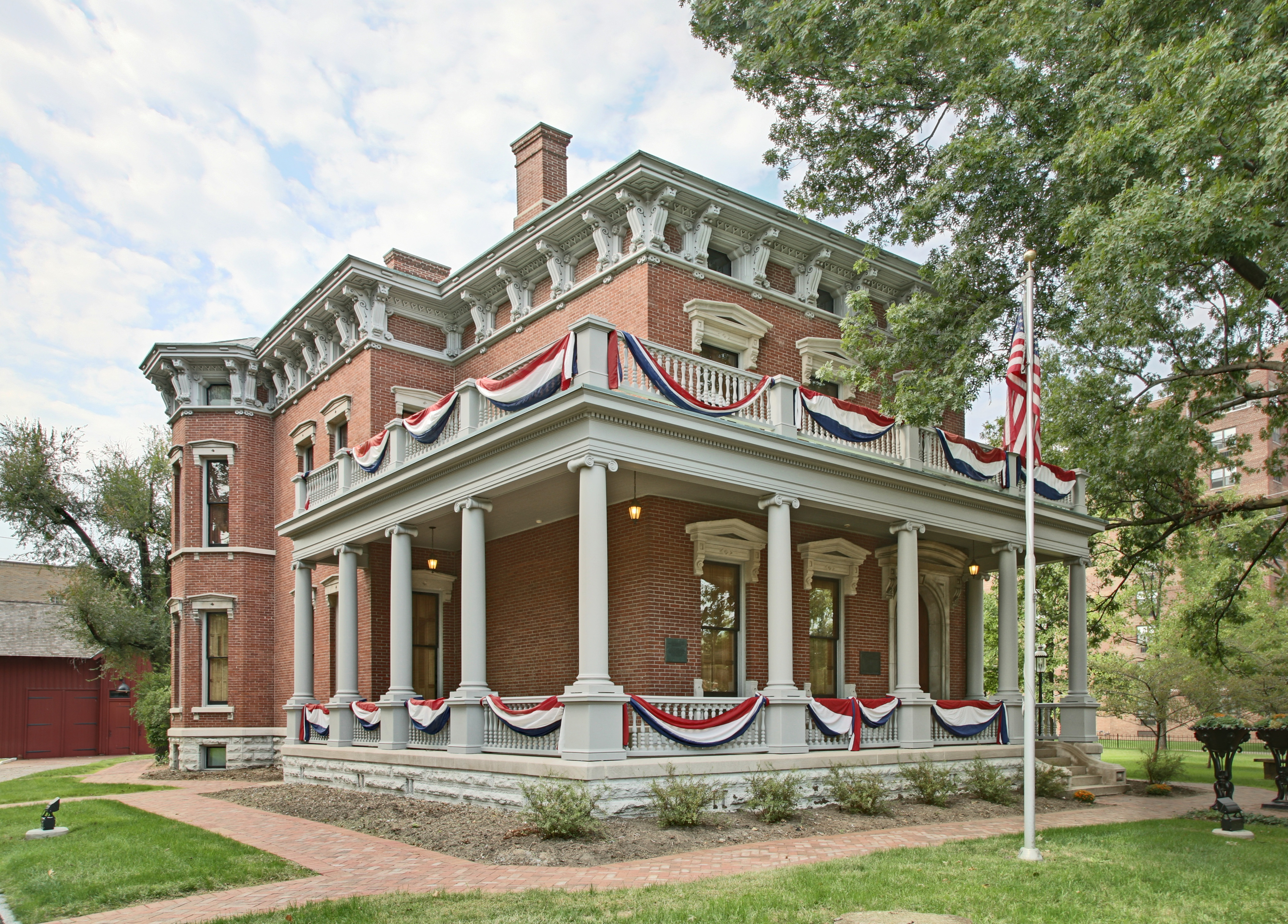
- Benjamin Harrison Home in 2008
- Interactive map outlining the home
- Location: Indianapolis, Indiana, U.S.
- Type: Presidential museum
- Visitors: 35,000
- Directors: Charles Hyde (President & CEO)
- Curator: Jennifer Capps
- Owner: Arthur Jordan Foundation
- Public transit access: 4, 5
- Website: bhpsite.org

The Benjamin Harrison Presidential Site, previously known as the Benjamin Harrison Home, is the former home of the 23rd president of the United States, Benjamin Harrison. It is in the Old Northside Historic District of Indianapolis, Indiana. Harrison's 16-room house was built from 1874 to 1875.

It was from the front porch of the house that Harrison instituted his famous Front Porch Campaign in the 1888 United States presidential campaign, often speaking to crowds on the street. In 1896, Harrison renovated the house and added electricity. He died there in a second-story bedroom in 1901. Today it is owned by the Arthur Jordan Foundation and operated as a museum to the former president by the Benjamin Harrison Foundation.

== History ==
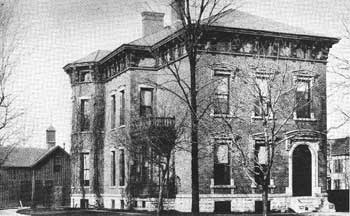
Harrison House in 1888, the year he was elected President

Benjamin Harrison arrived in Indianapolis in 1854 in order to begin a career as a lawyer. In 1867, following his service in the military, he bought a double lot from an auction, on what was then the outskirts of town, on North Delaware Street, just north of present-day Interstate 65. Construction of a house on the property commenced in 1874 and was completed in 1875 at a cost of $24,818.67 (equal to $727,638 today).

The Harrison family's move to 1230 Delaware Street set in motion the northward migration of prominent Indianapolis residents. When built, the property featured many elm and oak trees. Except for the time Benjamin Harrison served as United States Senator from Indiana (1881–1887), and his time as President of the United States (1889–1893), he lived at the home for the rest of his life. Benjamin Harrison died in the master bedroom of the house on March 13, 1901. While running for president in 1888, Benjamin Harrison issued campaign speeches to listeners on the street outside his home, in what were called "front-porch speeches". The front porch was not built until 1896, three years after he left the presidency.

After Benjamin Harrison's death, his widow Mary Lord Dimmick Harrison owned the property. In 1939, Mary Lord Harrison sold the house to the Arthur Jordan School of Music (now located at Butler University as the Jordan College of Fine Arts), with the proviso that the house would always serve as a memorial to Benjamin Harrison.

The Arthur Jordan School renovated the house, turning the second and third floors into a dormitory for the school's female students and converting the first floor into a museum. Until 1974, tours were provided by appointment. The Benjamin Harrison Home became a National Historic Landmark in 1966. That same year, the nonprofit Benjamin Harrison Foundation was incorporated to manage and operate the museum. Regular daily tours began in 1974 after the Arthur Jordan Foundation completed a second renovation completing its conversion into a house museum. The Arthur Jordan Foundation continues to lease the house to the Benjamin Harrison Foundation.

== Structure ==
- Benjamin Harrison Home
- U.S. National Register of Historic Places
- U.S. National Historic Landmark
- U.S. Historic district – Contributing property
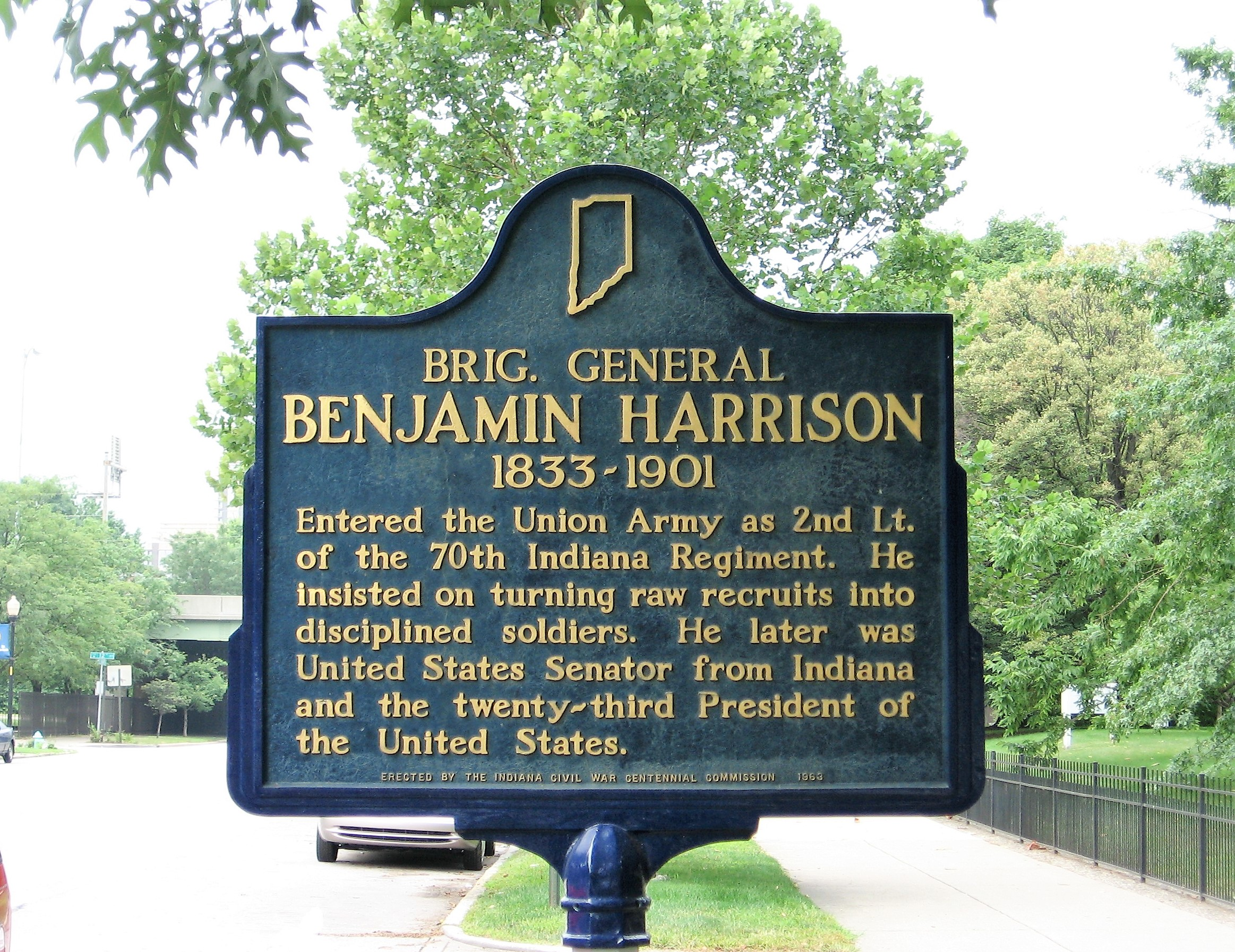

- Location within Indianapolis Location within Indiana Location within the United States
- Location: 1230 North Delaware Street; Indianapolis, Indiana
- Coordinates: 39°47′2.7″N 86°9′15.7″W
- Area: 3 acres (1.2 ha)
- Built: 1874
- Architect: Herman T. Brandt
- Architectural style: Italianate
- Visitation: 25,303 (2009)
- Part of: Old Northside Historic District (ID78000049)
- NRHP reference No.: 66000010

Significant dates
- Added to NRHP: October 15, 1966
- Designated NHL: January 29, 1964
- Designated CP: March 24, 1978

The Italianate Benjamin Harrison House was built at 1230 Delaware Street from 1874 to 1875, using the plans of architect Herman T. Brandt. The red brick house has sixteen rooms. The bracketed cornices and three-story bay window are indicative of the Italianate architecture style. Interior features include an oak-trimmed walnut staircase, butternut woodwork, and parquet floors. Many renovations took place in 1896, which included electricity and the front porch.

views of the home, past and present

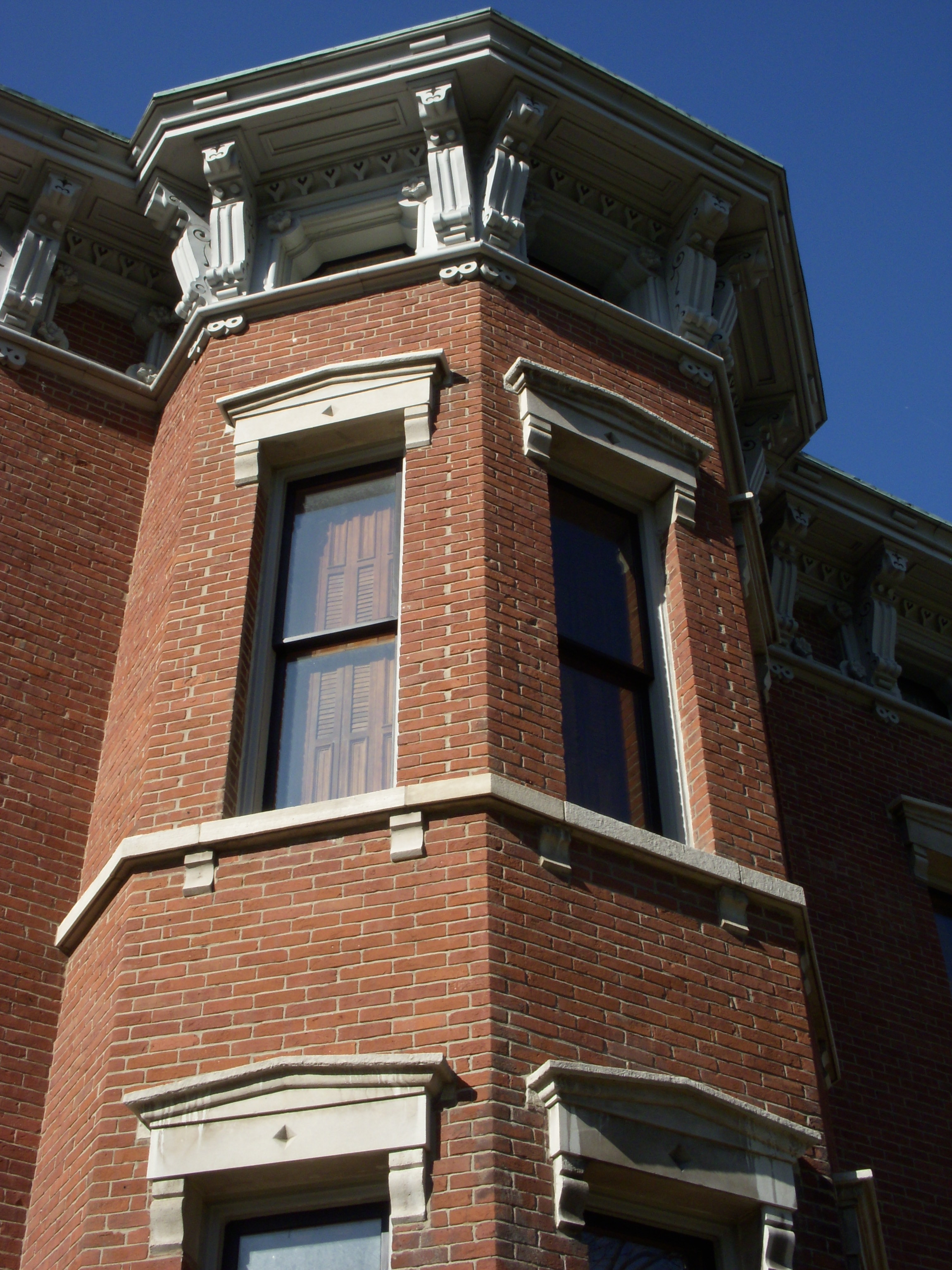

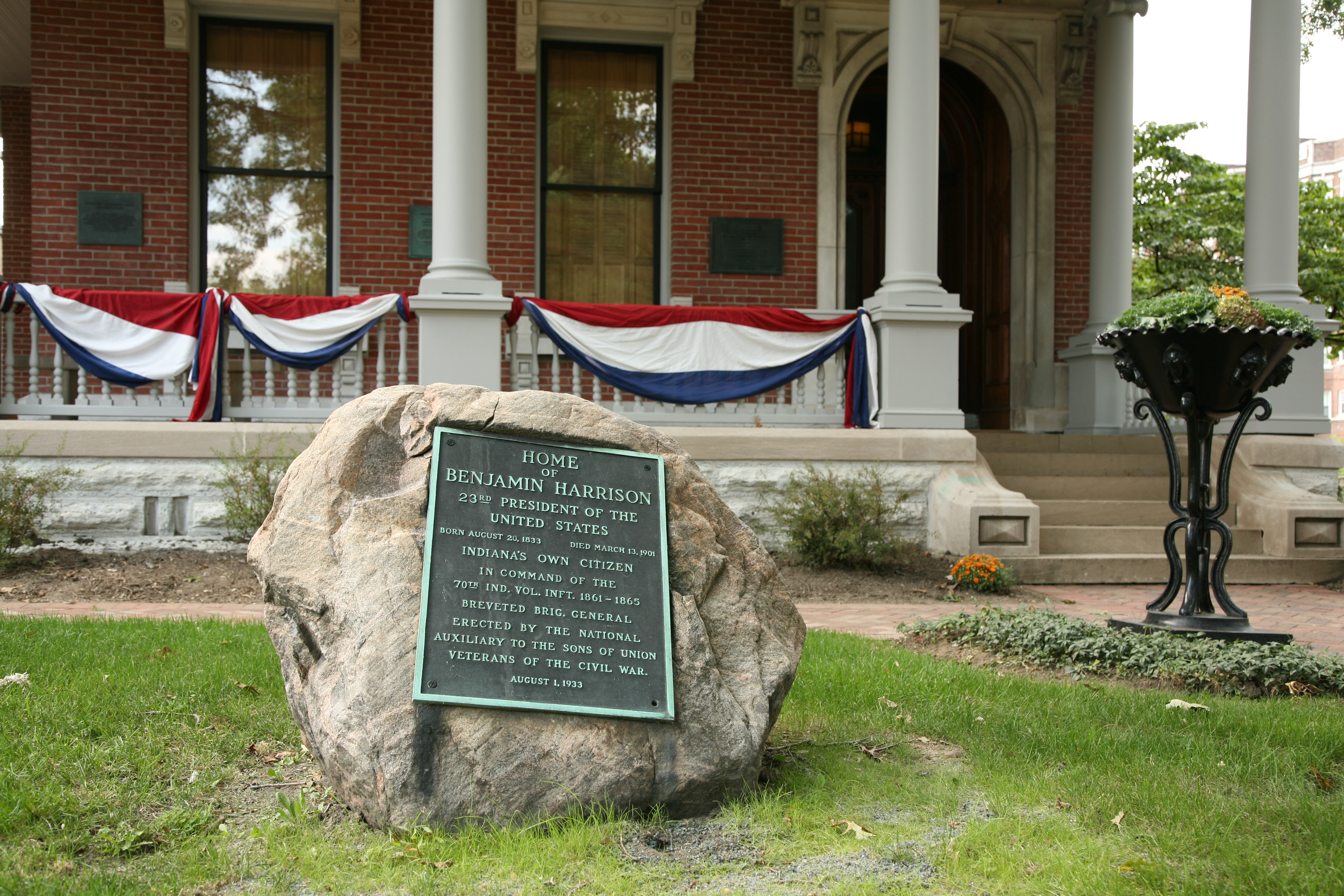

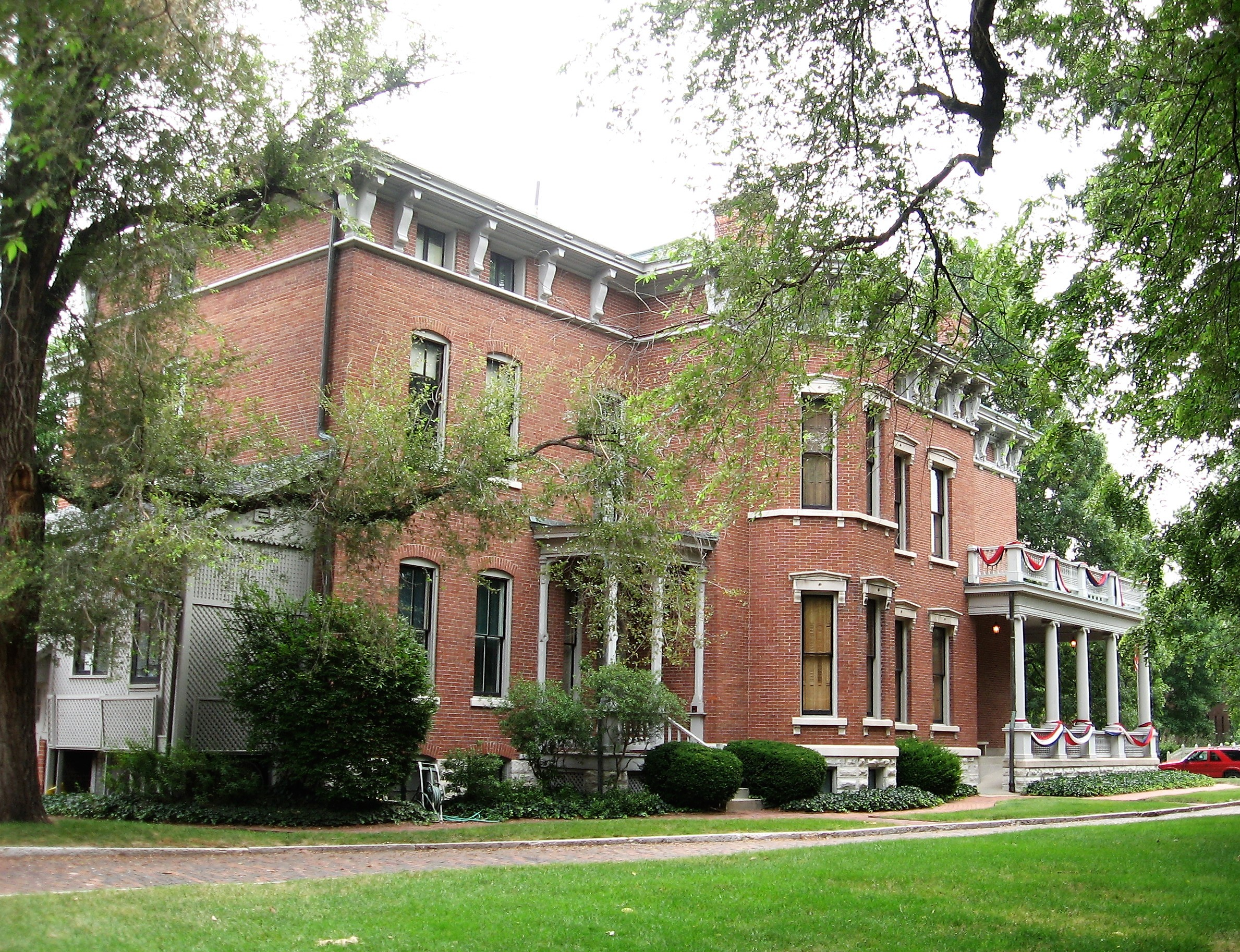

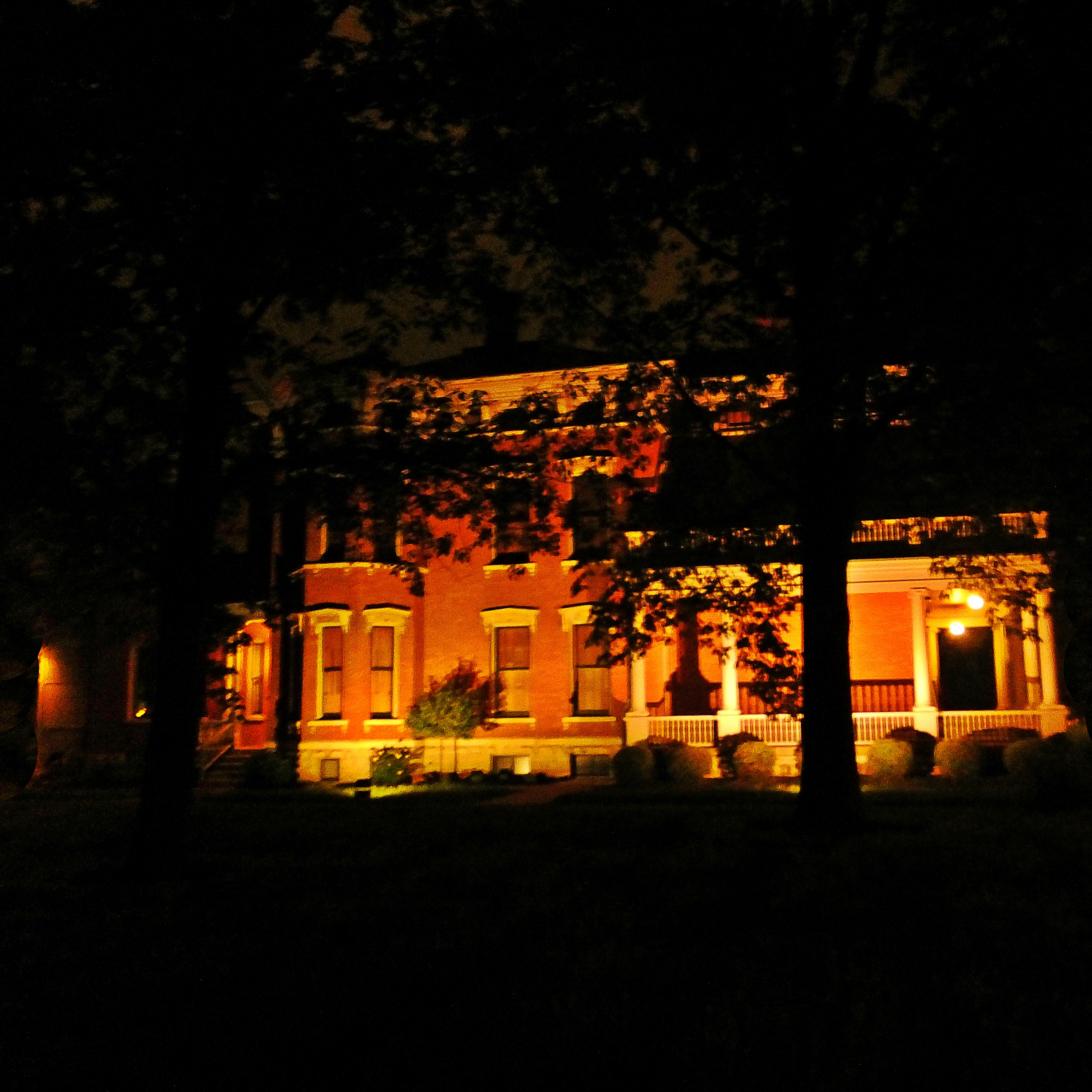

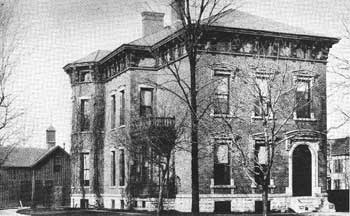

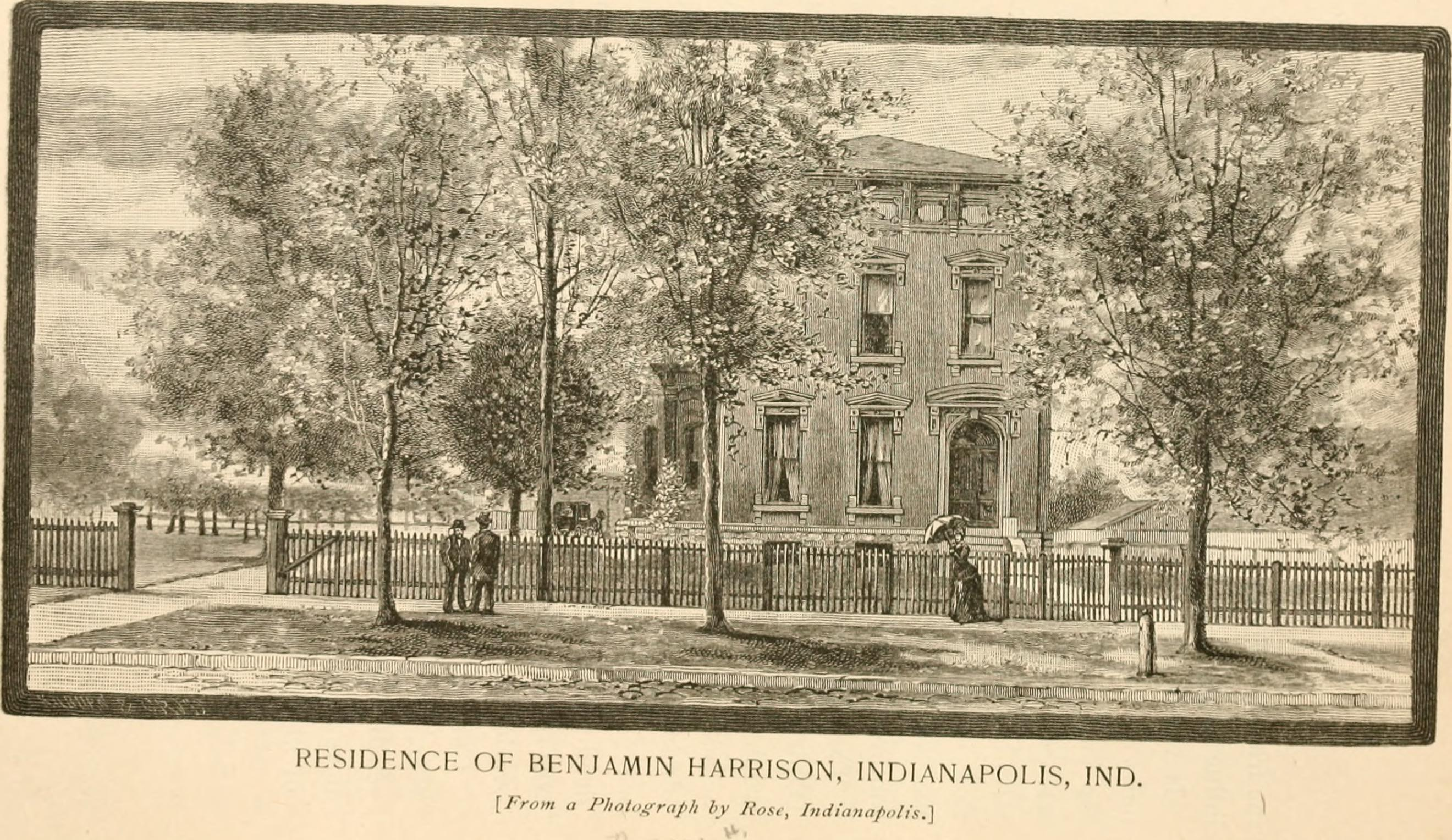

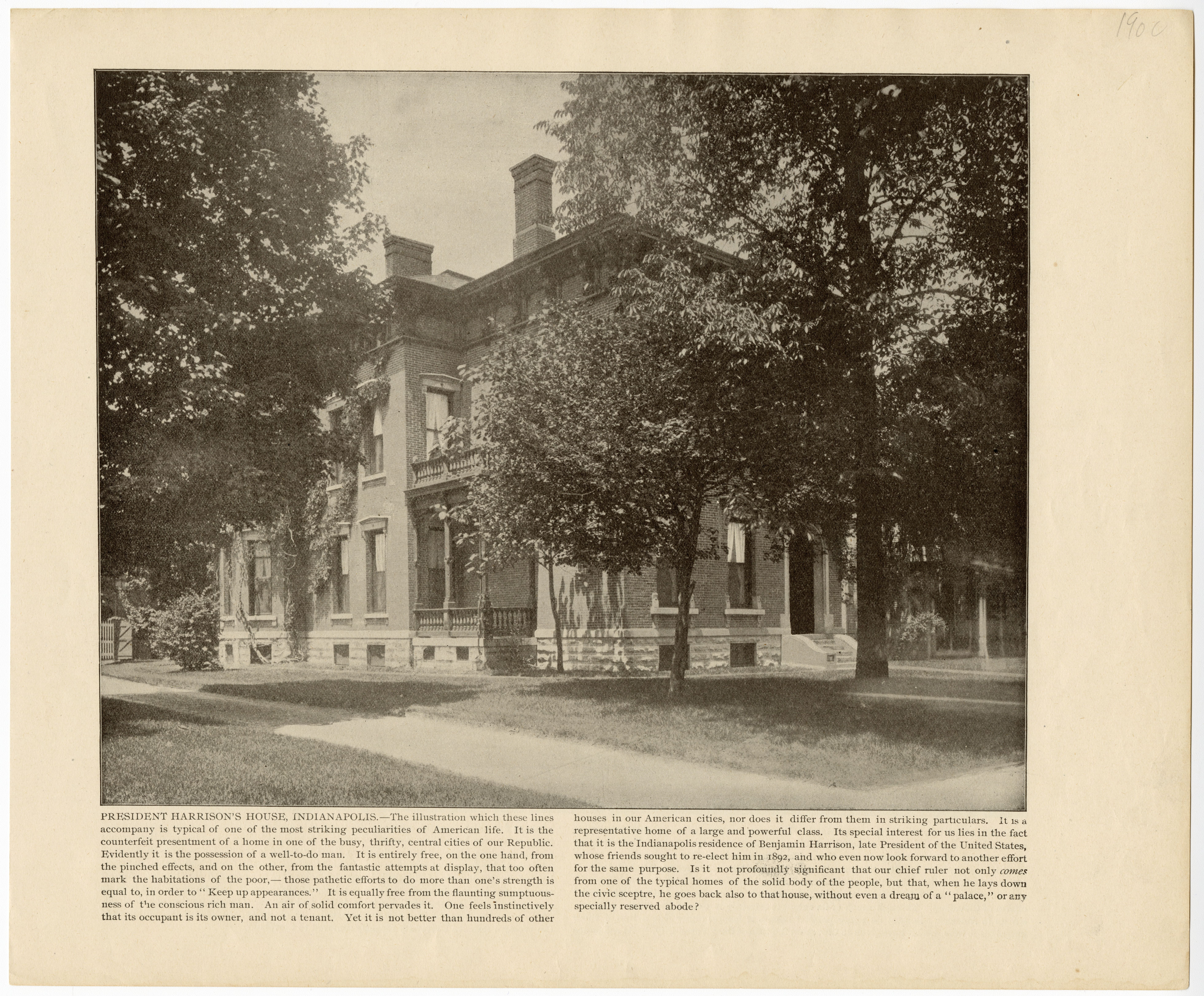

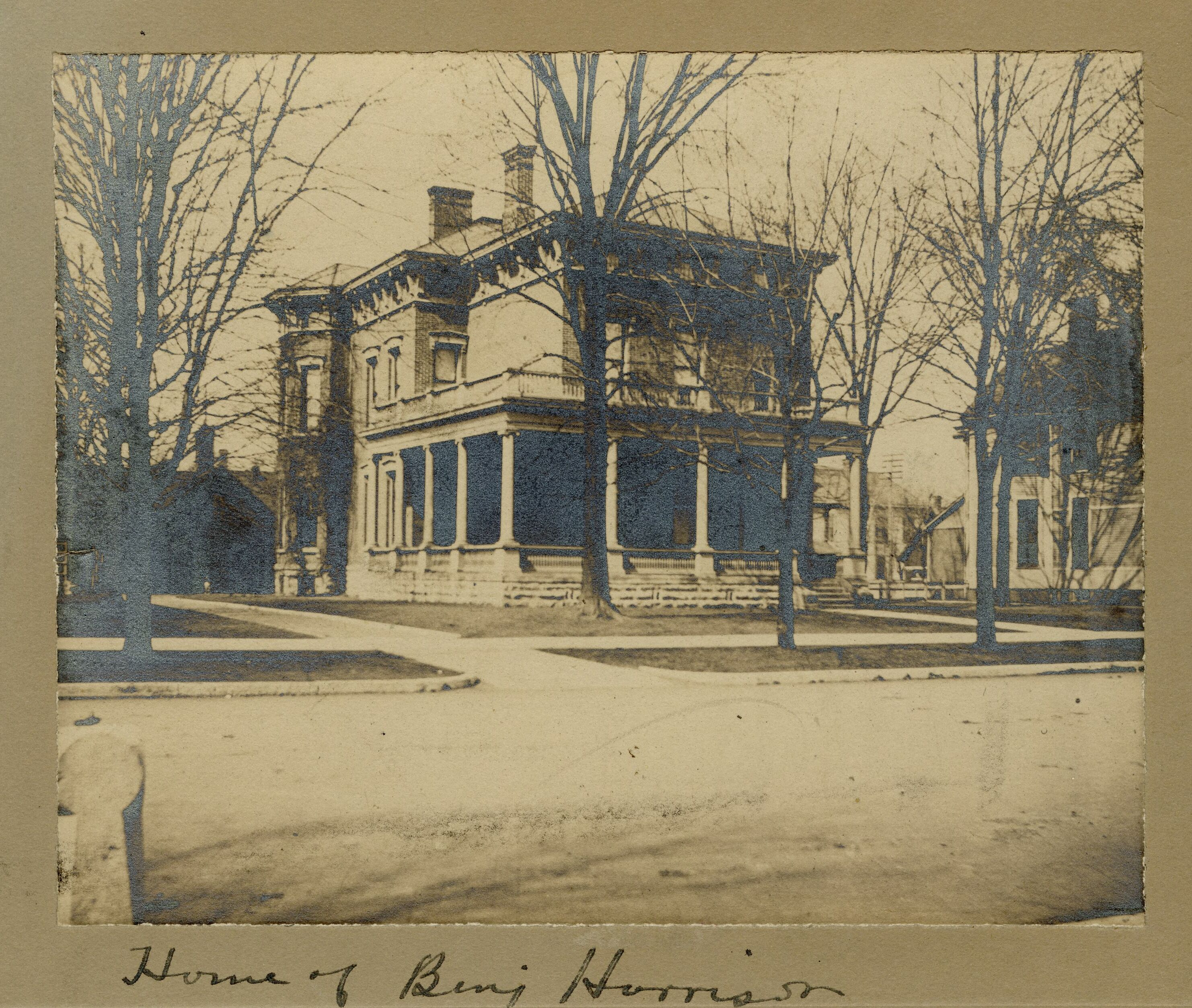

== Today ==
Presently, the house is open for tours throughout the week. Ten of the sixteen rooms are open for visitors, all decorated in the Victorian style typical of Benjamin Harrison's time at the residence. Seventy-five percent of the 3,700 pieces of memorabilia actually belonged to Benjamin Harrison and his family, and the books in the museum number 2,440. Besides archives regarding Benjamin Harrison, the house also features archives of the Daughters of the American Revolution. The front parlor is set to look as it did when Benjamin Harrison brought his new bride to the house.

Since the May 2015 mayoral and city council primary elections, the house has served as an Indianapolis/Marion County polling station, and is one of only two presidential memorials (besides the Ronald Reagan Presidential Library) to serve this function.

== See also ==
- List of attractions and events in Indianapolis
- List of museums in Indiana
- List of residences of presidents of the United States
- Presidential memorials in the United States
- List of National Historic Landmarks in Indiana
- National Register of Historic Places listings in Center Township, Marion County, Indiana
