= Kamm and Schellinger Brewery =

- U.S. National Register of Historic Places
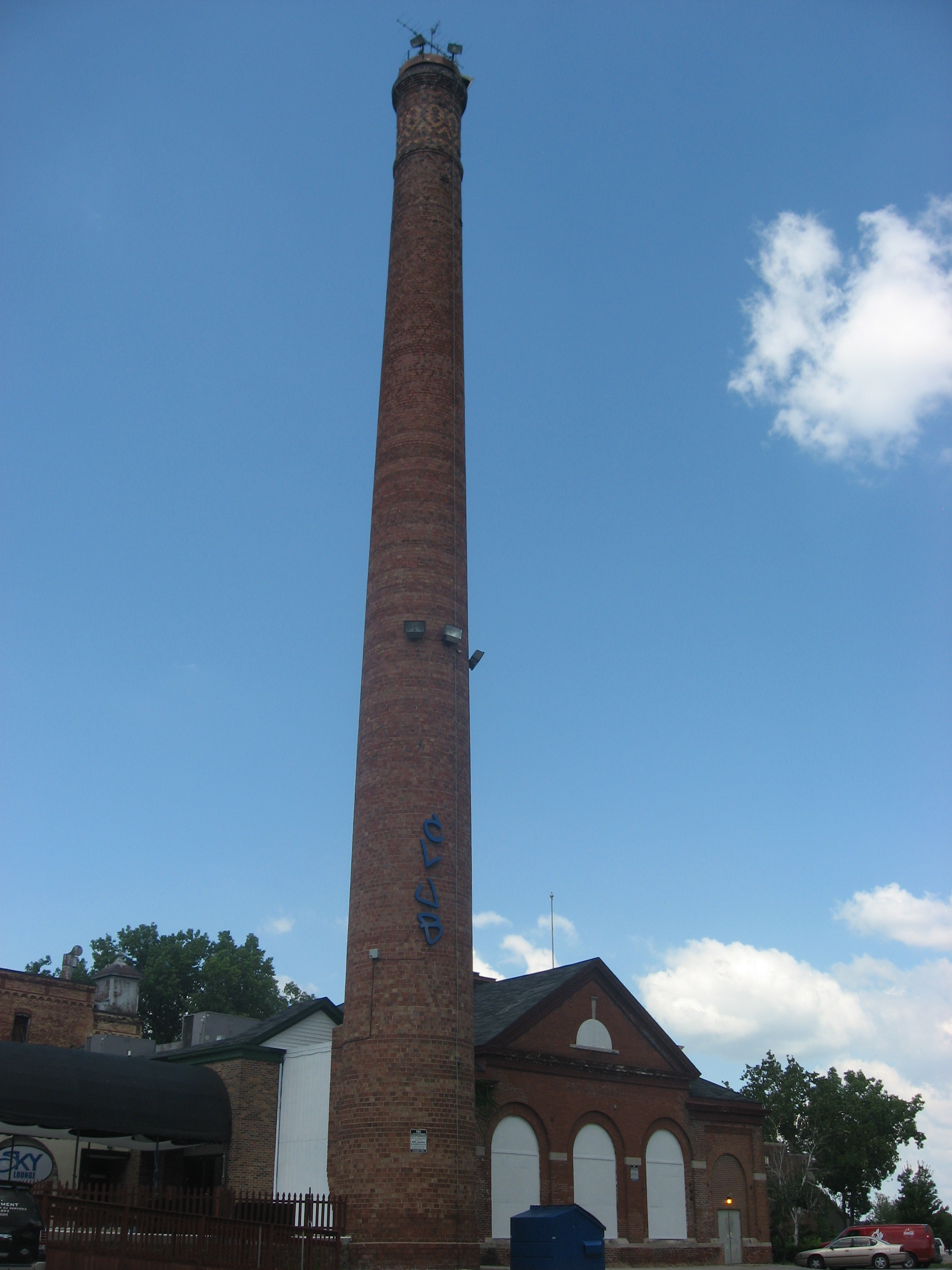
- Kamm and Schellinger Brewery chimney, July 2013

- Location within Indiana Location within the United States
- Location: 100 Center St., Mishawaka, Indiana
- Coordinates: 41°39′45″N 86°11′25″W
- Area: 4 acres (1.6 ha)
- Built: 1853
- Built by: Wagner, John
- Architectural style: Early Commercial
- NRHP reference No.: 79000042
- Added to NRHP: October 11, 1979

Kamm and Schellinger Brewery, also known as 100 Center Complex, is a historic brewery complex located at Mishawaka, Indiana. The complex consists of the original Brewery Building, the Stable Building (c. 1855), and the Boiler House (c. 1870) with a 262 foot tall brick chimney stack. The original Brewery Building was built in 1853, and is a four-story brick building with additions constructed about 1870 and 1875. It features an elaborate metal cornice, pediment and colonnaded cupola. The brewery ceased operations in 1951. It became an entertainment center in 1968 which included a cinema.

It was listed on the National Register of Historic Places in 1979.

== See also ==
- National Register of Historic Places listing in Indiana
- List of defunct breweries in the United States
- List of breweries in Indiana
