= McCurdy Hotel =

- U.S. National Register of Historic Places
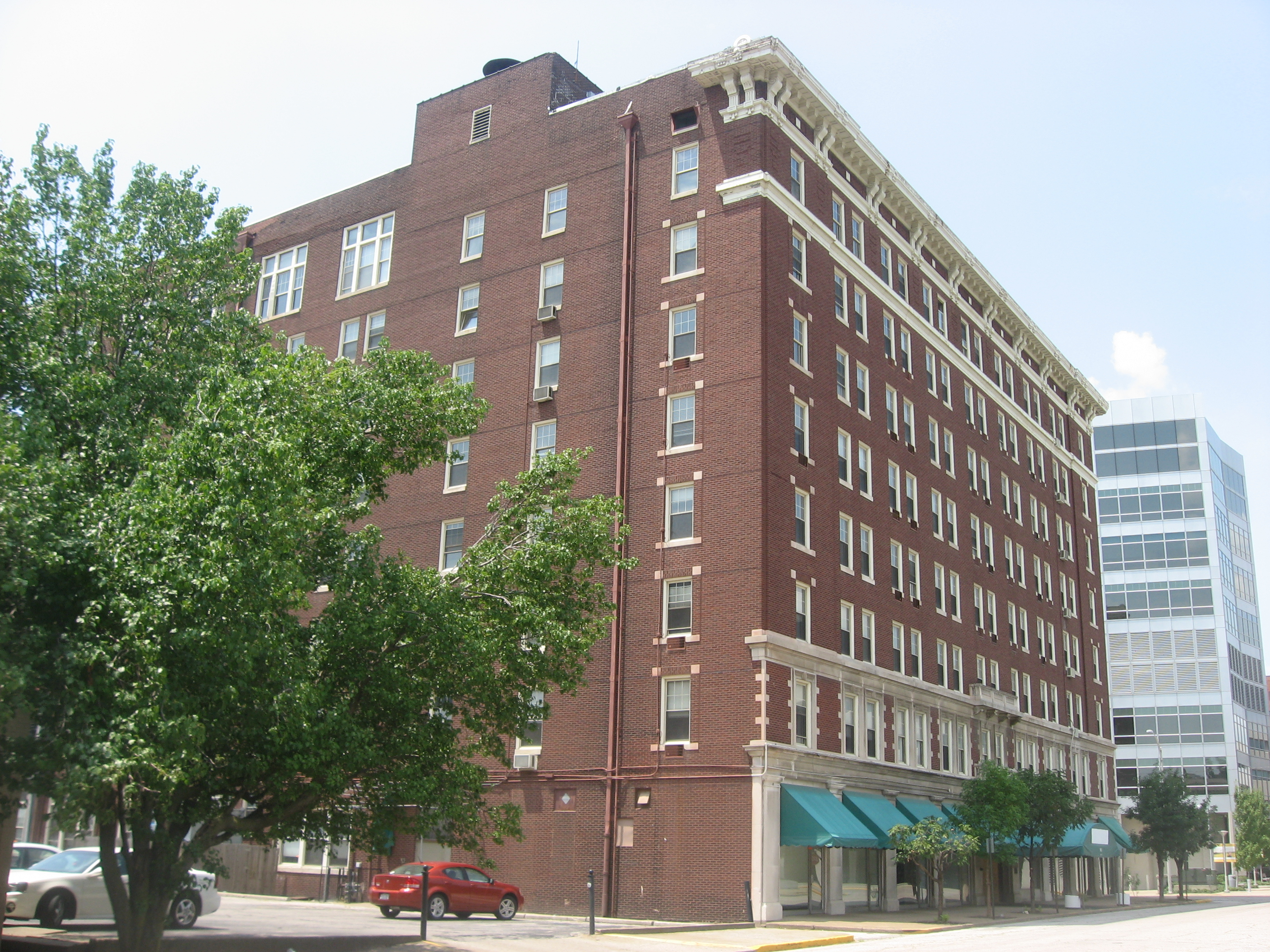
- Front and side of the hotel

- Location within Indiana Location within the United States
- Location: 101-111 SE 1st St., Evansville, Indiana
- Coordinates: 37°58′8″N 87°34′25″W
- Area: less than one acre
- Built: 1916
- Architect: Dietz, H. Ziegler
- Architectural style: Colonial Revival
- MPS: Downtown Evansville MRA
- NRHP reference No.: 82000109
- Added to NRHP: July 01, 1982

The McCurdy Hotel is a historic building in the Riverfront District of Evansville, Indiana. It was designed by architect Henry Ziegler Dietz and built in 1916–1917 in the Colonial Revival style. The McCurdy was constructed on the former site of the St. George Hotel, which was razed in 1915. It opened for business on June 17, 1917, and closed on March 16, 1969, due to bankruptcy. In Spring 2017, the McCurdy Hotel building was reopened as redeveloped apartments.

President Harry Truman stayed at the McCurdy while conducting a campaign stop in Evansville during the 1948 United States presidential election.

It was listed on the National Register of Historic Places in 1982.
