= Freyermuth =

Freyermuth is a surname. Notable people with the surname include:

- George W. Freyermuth (1868–1958), American politician and architect
- Gundolf S. Freyermuth (born 1955), American educator
- Ortwin Freyermuth (born 1958), American video game executive and film producer

== See also ==
- Freiermuth (disambiguation)
