= George W. Freyermuth =

American politician and architect (1868–1958)

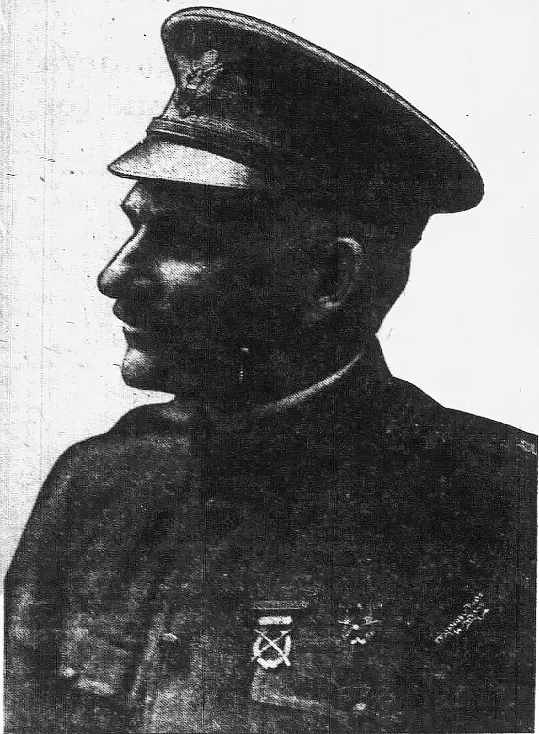
- Freyermuth in 1923 newspaper

Mayor of South Bend, Indiana
- In office January 1, 1935 – January 1, 1939
- Preceded by: Chester R. Montgomery
- Succeeded by: Jesse I. Pavey

Personal details
- Born: May 8, 1868 Philadelphia, Pennsylvania, U.S.
- Died: May 30, 1958 (aged 90) Excelsior, Michigan, U.S.
- Resting place: Riverview Cemetery; South Bend, Indiana, U.S.
- Party: Republican
- Spouse: Anna Bilstein (m. 1893; died 1930)
- Children: 1
- Occupation: Politician; military officer; architect
- Military career
- Allegiance: United States
- Rank: Colonel
- Units: 3rd Indiana Infantry; 157th Indiana Volunteers
- Conflicts: Spanish–American War; World War I

George W. Freyermuth (May 8, 1868 – May 30, 1958) was an American politician and architect from Indiana. He served as mayor of South Bend from 1935 to 1939. He was an architect of numerous buildings in South Bend, including the Sons of Israel Synagogue, the North Pumping Station and the Remedy Company Building.

== Early life ==
George W. Freyermuth was born on May 8, 1868, in Philadelphia to Barbara (née Rugg) and Jacob Freyermuth. His parents emigrated from Alsace, France, in the 1860s. His father was a contractor and a builder. His family moved to South Bend, Indiana, when he was four. He attended the common and high schools in South Bend and worked as a carpenter.

== Career ==
In 1888, Freyermuth joined Company F of the 3rd Indiana Infantry Regiment, a National Guard unit, as a private. During the Spanish–American War, Freyermuth served as a captain and commander of Company F of the 157th Indiana Volunteers. In 1916, Freyermuth was a lieutenant colonel in the 3rd Indiana Infantry Regiment. He was colonel of the 137th Field Artillery Regiment during World War I.

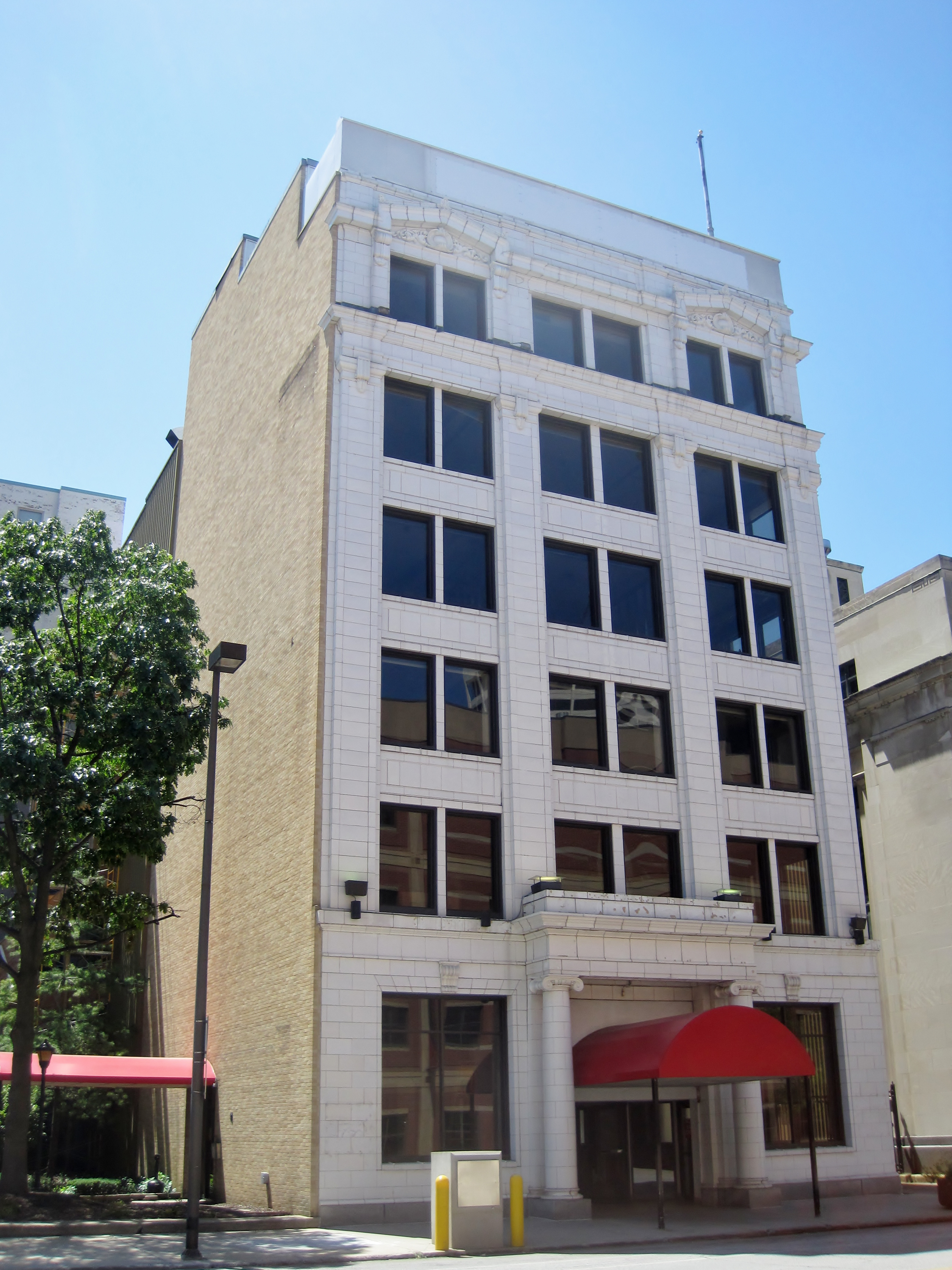
Citizens Bank in South Bend, one of the buildings Freyermuth designed

Freyermuth was an architect and designed buildings in South Bend with his partner R. V. Maurer. They formed the firm Freyermuth & Maurer in 1897. They designed buildings in South Bend, including city hall, the public library, the Sons of Israel Synagogue, the North Pumping Station, the James Monroe School and the Remedy Company Building. The architects worked together until 1934.

Freyermuth was a Republican. He defeated incumbent Chester R. Montgomery in the election for mayor of South Bend, Indiana, in 1934. He served as mayor from January 1, 1935, to January 1, 1939. He was defeated for re-election in 1938 by Jesse I. Pavey.

== Personal life ==
Freyermuth married Anna Bilstein on November 1, 1893. They had one son, James Russell. His wife died in 1930.

Freyermuth lived at 617 Vistula Avenue in South Bend. In 1947, Freyermuth moved to Excelsior, Michigan.

Freyermuth died on May 30, 1958, in Excelsior. He was buried at Riverview Cemetery in South Bend.

== Legacy ==
In 1948, Freyermuth was presented with the key to the city by South Bend.
