= Ortwin Freyermuth =

American film producer

Ortwin Sam Schneider-Freyermuth
- Born: November 1958 (age 67–68)
- Education: University of Göttingen; University of California
- Occupations: Co-Founder, Vice-Chairman and General Counsel at Cloud Imperium Games; Entertainment lawyer Film producer

Ortwin Sam Schneider-Freyermuth (born November 1958) is a German American video game executive, entertainment lawyer and film producer. He currently holds the position of co-founder (together with Chris Roberts), vice-chairman and general counsel of Cloud Imperium Games. He is also known for having been the CEO of film production company Capella Films and for producing the 1997 director's cut version of Wolfgang Petersen's Das Boot.

== Biography ==
Ortwin Freyermuth studied law at the University of Göttingen and at the University of California, Los Angeles, where he completed his Master degree (LL.M.) with a thesis on film distribution and copyright law in 1986. In the early 1990s, he was part of a group of German film producers who pioneered a new business model, acquiring the production and distribution rights for several Hollywood films with both financial and popular success. After having previously served as a legal advisor to Chris Roberts' Ascendant Pictures and other production companies, he founded Cloud Imperium Games with Roberts in April 2012 to create the video game Star Citizen.

Freyermuth is the brother of German journalist and author Gundolf S. Freyermuth.

== Academic works ==
- Deutsch, Erwin; Schneider-Freyermuth, Ortwin; Koenig, Ulrich (January 1985). Die Vervielfältigung von Filmen durch Hochschulen und ihre Einrichtungen : rechtliche Probleme untersucht am Beispiel des IWF- Filmverleihs (in German). Berlin; Tokyo: Springer. ISBN 978-3-540-15728-1. OCLC 38444169.
- Ortwin S Freyermuth (1986). Film Distribution and Modern Video Technology: The Shift of Motion Picture Distribution into the Private Sphere and its Impact on Copyright Protection (Thesis (LL. M.)). Los Angeles: University of California. OCLC 16163525.

== Filmography ==
=== Producer ===
- 1991: Shattered (co-producer)
- 1991: The Nutt House (executive producer)
- 1993: The Real McCoy (executive producer)
- 1993: Carlito's Way (executive producer)
- 1994: Body Shot (executive producer)
- 1997: Das Boot (producer – director's cut)
- 2011: The Ledge (executive producer)

=== Legal services ===
- 1988: Burning Secret (special consultant)
- 1990: The NeverEnding Story II: The Next Chapter (production executive)
- 2003: 11:14 (additional legal services)
- 2003: Monster (legal services – as Ortwin Freyermuth Esq.)
- 2005: Havoc (legal services)
- 2005: Lord of War (legal advisor: Ascendant Pictures)
- 2006: Ask the Dust (legal services: Freyermuth & Associates)
- 2006: Lucky Number Slevin (legal services: Freyermuth & Associates, Inc. – as Ortwin Freyermuth Esq.)
- 2013: 2 Guns (financing legal services: Freyermuth & Associates, Inc. for Foresight Unlimited – as Ortwin Freyermuth Esq.)
