= Morey-Lampert House =

Historic house in Indiana, United States

- U.S. National Register of Historic Places
- U.S. Historic district – Contributing property
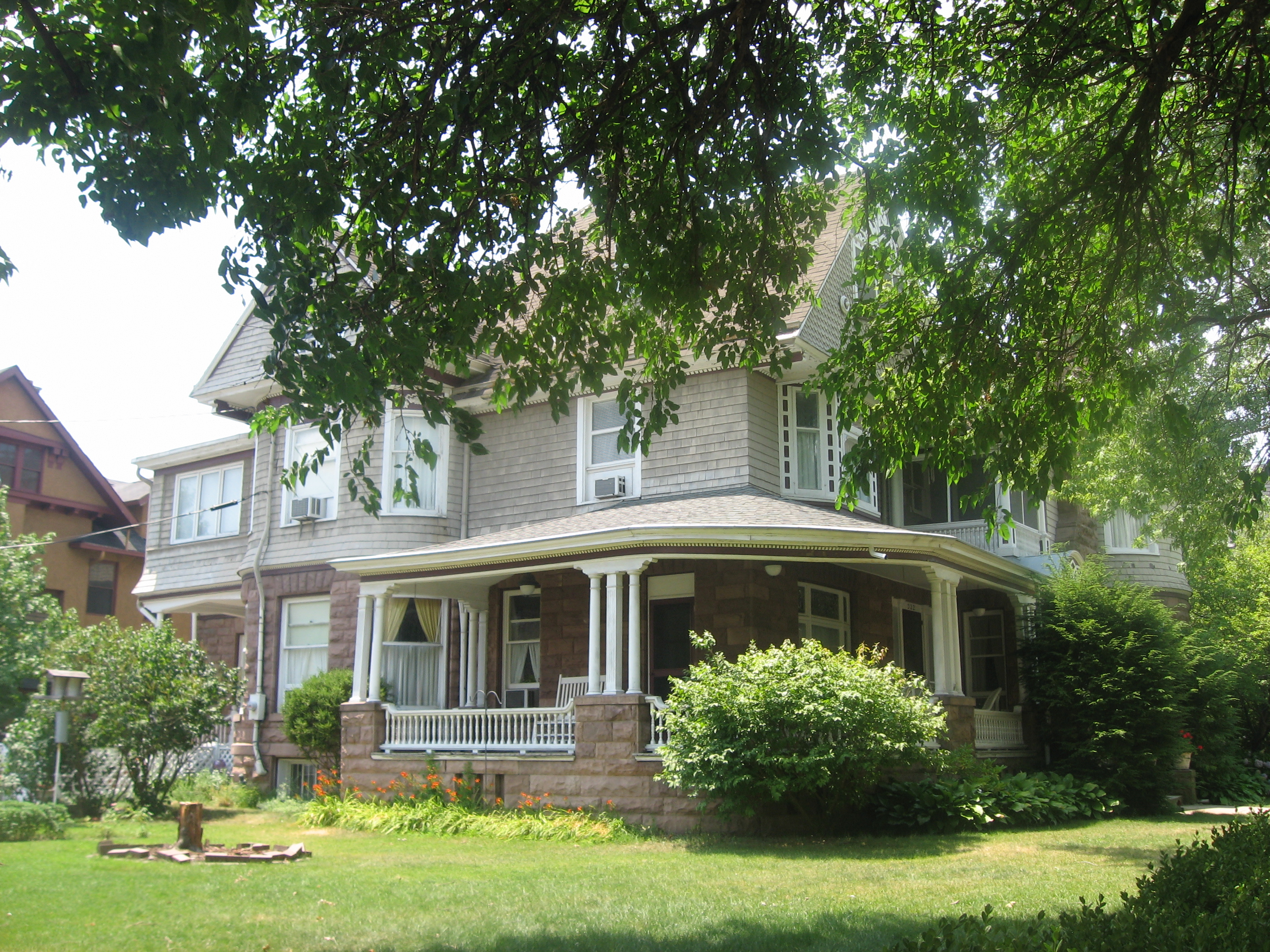
- Morey-Lampert House, July 2012

- Location within Indiana Location within the United States
- Location: 322 Washington, South Bend, Indiana
- Coordinates: 41°40′34″N 86°15′16″W
- Area: less than one acre
- Built: 1895; 131 years ago
- Architectural style: Queen Anne
- MPS: Downtown South Bend Historic MRA
- NRHP reference No.: 85001223
- Added to NRHP: June 5, 1985

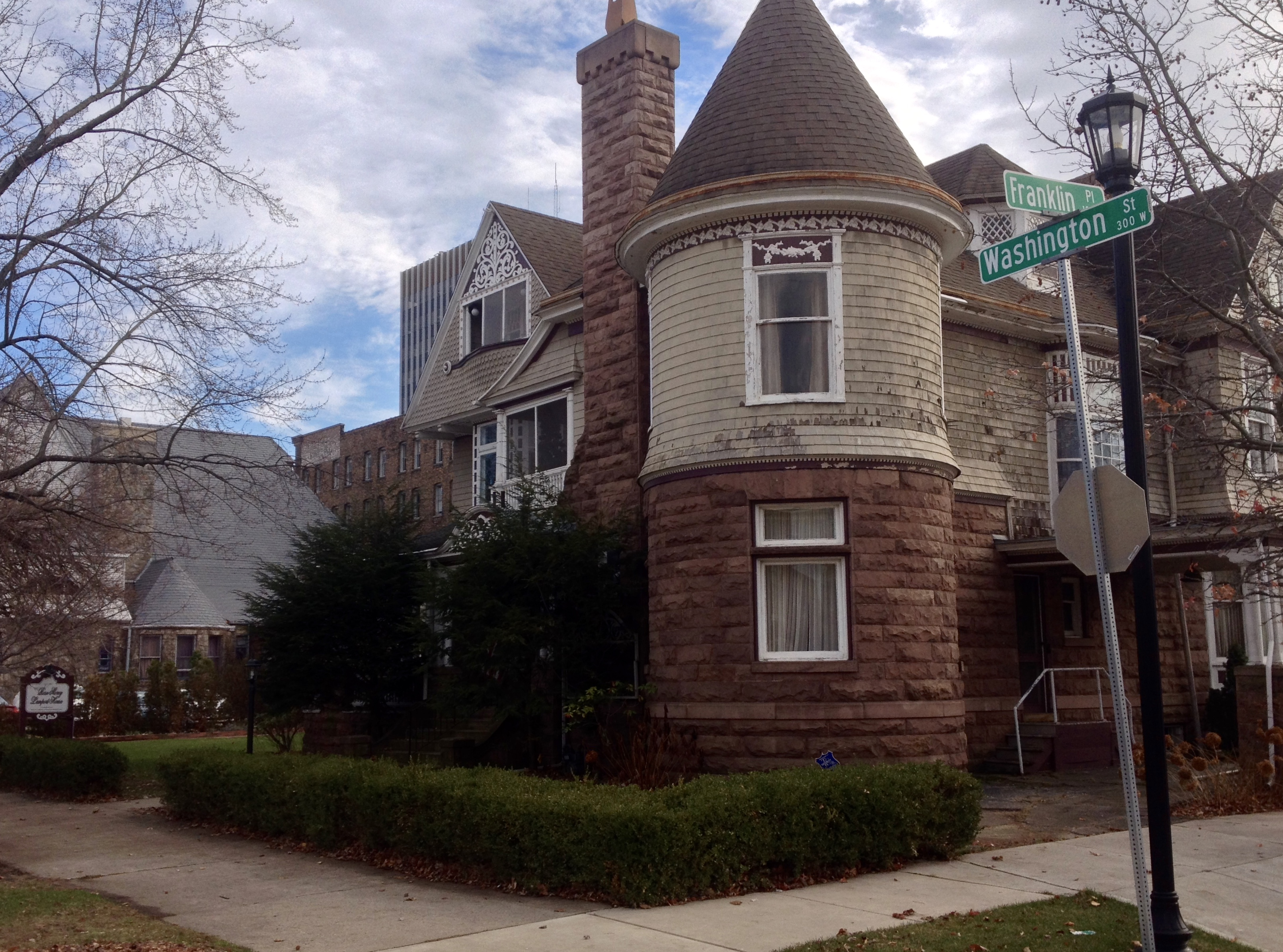
November 2015 view of the Rose-Morey-Lamport house in South Bend, Indiana. Taken along West Washington street looking southeast.

Morey-Lampert House or Rose-Morey-Lamport House is a historic home located at South Bend, Indiana, United States. It is located in the West Washington Historic District.

The home is designated a national historic landmark on the National Register of Historic Places (since 1985), and a local landmark as designated by the Historic Preservation Commission of South Bend and St. Joseph County.

It was built in 1895, and is a 2 1/2-story, Queen Anne style dwelling. The first story is of sandstone ashlar and the second story is sheathed in wood shingles. It features a wraparound porch and round corner tower topped by a conical roof.

The home was built as the residence of Dr. George P. Morey and his wife, Frances Helen Rose Morey, between 1894 and 1896.

== History ==
Dr. Morey was born in Orleans County in western New York in 1844. He served as a private in the Union Army during the Civil War and remained active in Grand Army of the Republic gatherings in South Bend into the 20th Century.

Frances Helen Rose Morey died on July 30, 1896, having lived in the home for only a few months. A daughter, Frances Claire Morey, died as a young girl. Dr. Morey and his other daughter, Helene Rose Morey continued to live in the house until 1908 when Dr. Morey gave it to Helene Rose Morey and her new husband, William Keyes Lamport, as a wedding gift. After William Lamport died in 1948, Helene Rose Morey Lamport continued to live in her childhood home until the mid-1950s. Helene Rose Morey Lamport died August 22, 1963, in Westport, Connecticut where she was living with her daughter Helen Morey Lamport Ogle. William Keyes Lamport was the first managing editor of the South Bend Tribune and later in the 1920s founding partner of Lamport, Fox, Prell and Dolk a notable advertising firm in South Bend and the upper Midwest.

Helene Lamport sold the house in the mid-1950s, and the home has since witnessed several uses – as offices, as a bed and breakfast, and currently returning to its original use as a private residence.

The two generations of family who first lived there – Dr. Morey, Frances Helen Rose Morey, their son-in-law William Lamport, and his wife Helene Rose – each contribute to the name the house is currently known as, the Rose-Morey-Lamport-House.

Among the earliest of the larger mansions in South Bend, Indiana, the local historic preservation commission refers to the home an “outstanding example of the Queen Anne style.”

The home contains a large stained glass window that was a medal winner at the Chicago World's Fair in 1893. Dr. Morey purchased the window for $2,800 (approximately $74,000 in 2015 dollars) and had it installed along a west facing wall in order to catch light from the setting sun. Both it and a smaller window, known as “Mignon,” are in the home today.

== See also ==
West Washington Historic Walking Tour brochure
