= Freiermuth =

Freiermuth may refer to:

- Pat Freiermuth (born 1998), American football player
- Rico Freiermuth (born 1958), Swiss bobsledder

== See also ==
- Freyermuth
