= West Washington Historic District =

Historic district in Indiana, United States

- U.S. National Register of Historic Places
- U.S. Historic district
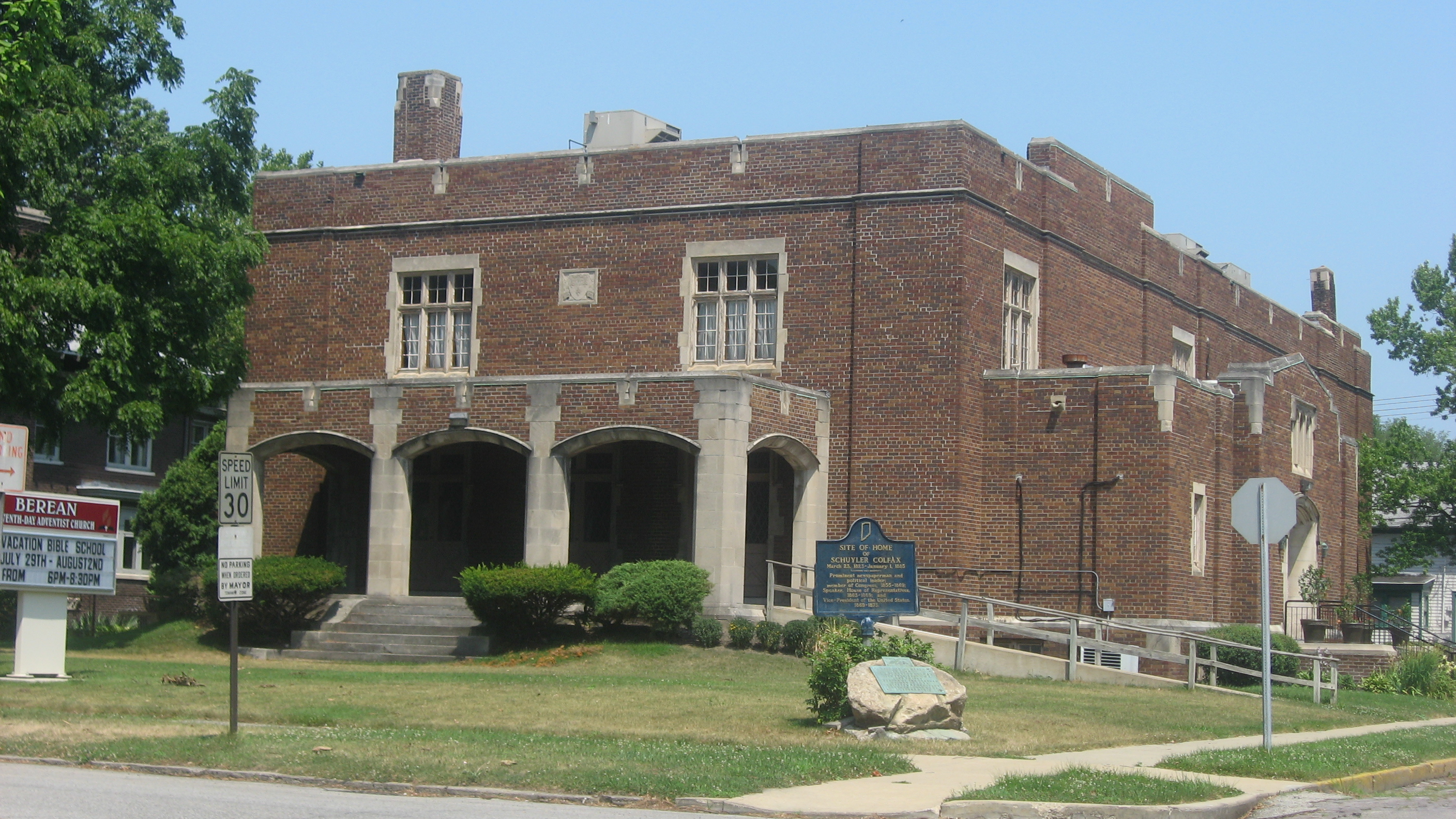
- Schuyler Colfax home site and Berean SDA Church, July 2012

- Location within Indiana Location within the United States
- Location: Irregular pattern roughly bounded by Main St., Western Ave., W. LaSalle Ave., and McPherson St., South Bend, Indiana
- Coordinates: 41°40′32″N 86°15′30″W
- Area: 97.7 acres (39.5 ha)
- Architect: Multiple
- Architectural style: Mixed (more Than 2 Styles From Different Periods)
- MPS: Downtown South Bend Historic MRA
- NRHP reference No.: 75000049
- Added to NRHP: January 17, 1975

West Washington Historic District is a national historic district located at South Bend, Indiana. It encompasses 330 contributing buildings in an upper class residential section of South Bend. It developed between about 1854 and 1910, and includes notable examples of Italianate, Greek Revival, and Romanesque Revival style architecture. Located in the district are the separately listed Morey-Lampert House, Oliver Mansion (Copshaholm, 1896) designed by Lamb and Rich, Second St. Joseph County Courthouse, South Bend Remedy Company Building, and Tippecanoe Place. Other notable buildings include the Bartlett House (1850), Birdsell House (1897), DeRhodes House (Avalon Grotto, 1906) designed by Frank Lloyd Wright, Holley House (c. 1860), Kaiser-Schmidt House (c. 1890), Listenberger-Nemeth House (c. 1870), Meahger-Daughterty House (1884), O'Brien House (c. 1920), Oren House (c. 1875), The People's Church (1889), St. Hedwig's Church (c. 1895), St. Patrick's Church (1886), St. Paul's Memorial United Methodist Church (1901), West House (c. 1850), and a row of worker's houses (c. 1865–1900).

It was listed on the National Register of Historic Places in 1975.
