= Star Citizen =

In-development multiplayer space game

- Developer: Cloud Imperium Games
- Publisher: Roberts Space Industries
- Director: Chris Roberts
- Writers: Dave Haddock; Will Weissbaum; Adam Wieser; Cherie Heiberg
- Composers: Pedro Camacho; Geoff Zanelli
- Engine: StarEngine
- Platform: Windows
- Release: Early access December 23, 2017
- Genres: MMO; Space trading and combat; First-person shooter; Immersive sim
- Modes: Single-player (Squadron 42), multiplayer

Star Citizen is an online space trading and combat simulation game under development by Cloud Imperium Games and published by Roberts Space Industries for Windows. An extended retry of unrealized plans for Freelancer (2003), Star Citizen is led by director Chris Roberts. The game was announced in 2012 and was followed by a Kickstarter campaign which drew over US$2 million. After more than a decade in development, no projected date for the end of early access in Star Citizen has been announced.

In 2013, Cloud Imperium Games began releasing parts of the game, known as "modules", to provide players with the opportunity to experience gameplay features prior to release. The "Persistent Universe" module was made available for testing to pre-purchasers in 2015 with Star Citizen released in early access in 2017. It continues to receive updates. Star Citizen has garnered criticism during its long production process, both for the lack of a clear date for the end of early access and for the challenges backers have faced in getting a refund after abandoning the project. The launch of the game was originally anticipated for 2014, but has been repeatedly delayed.

After the initial Kickstarter ended, Cloud Imperium Games continued to raise funds through the sale of ships and other in-game content. Star Citizen monetization models have led to further criticism and legal issues for the project. It is one of the highest-funded crowdfunding projects. As of May 2026, combined crowdfunding and early access sales had passed US$1 billion, making Star Citizen one of the most expensive video games to develop and among the most expensive single pieces of entertainment produced.

== Gameplay ==
Star Citizen combines features from space simulator, first-person shooter, and massively multiplayer online genres in a larger multiplayer 'persistent universe', as well as a combined dogfighting mod/first-person shooter combat sim called 'Arena Commander'.

=== Persistent Universe ===
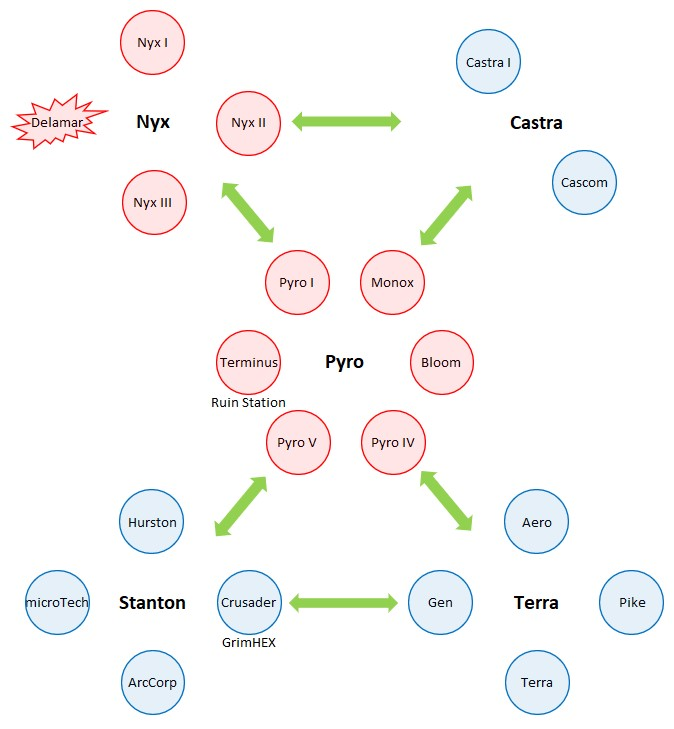
The first five systems planned for release 1.0 of Star Citizen

The Persistent Universe is the main, open-world, and massively multiplayer game mode of Star Citizen. Players can freely navigate and explore the surfaces of over a dozen planets and moons.

Players can create male or female avatars for the Persistent Universe. Upon entering the mode, players spawn at a space station or a city. Once spawned, players are given the freedom to choose what they pursue, whether it is trading, bounty hunting, mining, or taking on missions. A law system keeps track of player activities and penalizes players for engaging in criminal behavior with prison time when captured. In order to reduce their criminal rating, players must hack the law enforcement network, pay off any fines they have incurred, or serve their prison sentence.

Movement is available in both gravity and zero-gravity environments. Different planets have different gravitational pulls which alter player jump heights. In zero-gravity, players can move with six degrees of freedom, with forward movement possible through thrusters on their backs. If a player enters a ship, they can freely traverse it with artificial gravity affecting them.

While the final game will use an in-game currency called UEC, short for United Earth Credits, the current early-access version uses a temporary currency called aUEC (Alpha United Earth Credits), which will be reset from time to time and at the release of the game.

Any purchased or rented ship or vehicle can be spawned by the player at a landing zone via the ASOP Vehicle Retrieval Terminals. Ships can be purchased with real-world funds or at in-game kiosks with earned credits. Rental ships can be procured at separate kiosks for intervals ranging from a few days to a month. If a ship is destroyed, players must file an insurance claim and wait a period of time for it to be delivered. Players can pilot ships both in space and in atmospheres; transitions between the two occur without loading screens in real time.

Planets in the game are procedurally generated with distinct biomes and areas of interest. On each planet is a landing zone, often within a city, where players can disembark and explore on foot. Some cities include transit systems that connect various sections together. Stores that carry various weapons and items can be found in these zones, allowing players to purchase equipment and trade goods for their character and ships. On most planets, cave systems are available for players to explore, in which they can take on investigation missions or mine for rare ores.

=== Arena Commander ===
Arena Commander is an in-fiction combat simulator allowing players to engage in combat against other players or AI enemies either on-foot or with a spaceship. In the Free Flight game type, players can fly their ships with no predefined objective. The Vanduul Swarm and Pirate Swarm game modes are cooperative missions where players fight waves of AI enemies. Capture the Core is a game type inspired by classic capture the flag rules, where a team must capture the opposing team's core and deposit it on their side. A racing game type, set on a specifically designed map with three courses, allows players to fly through checkpoints and attempt to beat each other's time. Game types like Battle Royale and Team place players in direct opposition of one another, gaining points for destroying enemy ships.

G-force effects on the pilot were introduced in Arena Commander, which could cause the player character to black out if they moved in a way that applied substantial g-forces on the ship. Equipment to customize ships used in Arena Commander can be rented to further allow for modification of player ship combat ability. While a multi-crew component of Arena Commander was announced at a 2015 Star Citizen conference, it has yet to be implemented in the game.

=== Hangar module ===
In the hangar module, players were able to explore or modify their purchased ships that have been publicly released and interact with the ship's systems, though no flying options were available. Also included were decorations and flair that can be placed and arranged within the hangar. The hangar module was removed in Alpha Patch 3.13.1a, released on May 2021. Its functionality has largely been implemented into the Persistent Universe.

=== Star Marine ===
Star Marine is an in-fiction ground combat simulator, allowing players to fight each other with conventional weaponry. Two maps were made available on release, along with two game types: Elimination and Last Stand.

Last Stand is a "capture-and-hold" game type in which two opposing teams (the Marines and the Outlaws) each attempt to capture one or more control points to gain points; as a team captures more control points, they gain points at a steadily increasing rate. Elimination is a free-for-all game type; unlike the team-based "Last Stand", players work individually to gain the highest kill-count before the match ends. Both game variants last for ten minutes or (in the case of Last Stand) until one team accrues the higher score.

Star Marine was merged with Arena Commander with Alpha Patch 2.6.0, released in 2016.

== Squadron 42 ==
Squadron 42 is a story-based single-player game set in the Star Citizen fictional universe described by the developers as a "spiritual successor to Wing Commander". It is being developed by the Foundry 42 studio under the supervision of Chris Roberts' brother Erin, who had already worked with him on the Wing Commander series and led the production and development of games like Privateer 2: The Darkening and Starlancer. It was originally announced for release in 2014 during the Kickstarter campaign, but was delayed multiple times. In mid-2019 CIG stated that a beta release was planned before the end of Q2 2020, then an estimated Q3 2020 on a now abandoned roadmap. In December 2020 Chris Roberts announced there will be no official release date or gameplay footage at this time. "I have decided that it is best to not show Squadron 42 gameplay publicly, nor discuss any release date until we are closer to the home stretch and have high confidence in the remaining time needed to finish the game to the quality we want". At CitizenCon 2024, first gameplay parts of Squadron 42 were shown and a release in 2026 was suggested. In August 2026, Roberts announced that the game's release window was delayed to Q2 2027.

The developers state that the interactive storyline centers on an elite military unit and involves the player character enlisting in the United Empire of Earth Navy, taking part in a campaign that starts with a large space battle. The player's actions will allow them to optionally achieve citizenship in the UEE and affect their status in the Star Citizen persistent universe, but neither of the two games has to be played in order to access the other. In addition to space combat simulation and first-person shooter elements, reported features include a conversation system that affects relationships with non-player pilots. An optional co-operative mode was initially proposed in the Kickstarter, but later changed to be a separate mode added after release. The game is planned to be released in multiple episodes, and according to the developers will be offering an estimated 20 hours of gameplay for Squadron 42 Episode One with about 70 missions worth of gameplay. Squadron 42 Episodes Two and Three will launch later. The cast for Squadron 42 includes Gary Oldman, Mark Hamill, Gillian Anderson, Mark Strong, Liam Cunningham, Andy Serkis, John Rhys-Davies, Jack Huston, Eleanor Tomlinson, Harry Treadaway, Sophie Wu, Damson Idris, Eric Wareheim, Rhona Mitra, Henry Cavill, and Ben Mendelsohn amongst others.

== Development ==
=== Background ===
Cloud Imperium Games' logo

Star Citizen is under development by Cloud Imperium Games, a studio founded by Chris Roberts, Sandi Roberts, and Ortwin Freyermuth in 2012. While working at Origin Systems from 1990 to 1996, Roberts became known for his groundbreaking Wing Commander franchise. After the completion of Starlancer in 1999 by Roberts' studio Digital Anvil, lengthy delays in the production of extensive plans for the game Freelancer led to the company's acquisition by Microsoft and Roberts' exit from the project. Completed under a new lead and numerous staff replacements, the finished game was well received, but criticized for lacking the extensive features Roberts had planned. Roberts has since claimed that Star Citizen is a spiritual successor to both Wing Commander and Freelancer.

Pre-production of Star Citizen began in 2010 with production starting in 2011 using CryEngine 3. Several contractors and outsourced development companies such as CGBot, Rmory, VoidAlpha and Behaviour Interactive were hired to build an early prototype of the game and concept art. The goal of the prototype was to gain outside investment, but following the success for the Double Fine Adventure Kickstarter campaign, Roberts decided to crowdfund the game instead. After hiring Ortwin Freyermuth, Ben Lesnick, and David Swofford, Cloud Imperium Games was formed with the intention of building the initial campaign. Star Citizen was officially announced at GDC on October 10, 2012, during which the website they had built for the campaign crashed. Following the GDC presentation, the company announced a Kickstarter campaign on October 18, 2012.

A heavily modified version of Amazon Lumberyard called StarEngine is used for the development of Star Citizen and Squadron 42. The game was originally developed on CryEngine 3 before switching to Lumberyard in December 2016. According to creative director Chris Roberts, the decision to switch to Lumberyard was based on its online services such as deep back-end cloud integration on Amazon Web Services and its social component with live-streaming platform Twitch.

=== Kickstarter and early releases ===
In its initial debut on Kickstarter, Star Citizen was marketed as "everything that made Wing Commander and Privateer / Freelancer special". The proposed game was claimed to include a single-player story driven mode called Squadron 42 that would include drop in/drop out co-op, a company-hosted persistent universe mode, a self-hosted, mod-friendly multiplayer mode, no subscriptions, and no pay-to-win mechanics. The initial estimated target release date was stated to be November 2014, with all proposed features available at launch. Additional promised features included virtual reality support, flight stick support, and a focus on high-end PC hardware. While the initial release would be targeted for Windows, Roberts stated that Linux support was a goal for the project after its official release.

As development continued, Chris Roberts announced in August 2013 that they would be releasing the "Hangar Module", a way for players to explore an enclosed space and some of the ships that have been completed. The module was released six days later, on August 29, and was considered the "first deliverable" of the project. This would mark the beginning of Star Citizen's modular development process, where smaller pieces of the game would be released leading up to the release of the Persistent Universe. During this early period, it was announced that the games would utilize the artificial intelligence system Kythera, developed by Moon Collider.

The game is produced in a distributed development process by Cloud Imperium Games and Foundry 42 with studios in Austin, Frankfurt, Santa Monica, Wilmslow, and Derby. Additional partners that are or have been working on the project include Turbulent, Virtuos, and Wyrmbyte. Turbulent was acquired by Cloud Imperium Games in July 2023.

==== Arena Commander ====
Arena Commander, the "flight combat" module, was released on June 4, 2014. It allows players to test the ship combat and racing portion of the game against other players or AI opponents in various game types. These game types were released to all players as single-player offerings, with a small number of players receiving access to the multiplayer version with plans to scale until the module was considered fully released.

On August 11, 2014, Arena Commander was updated to open access to all players and added the Capture the Core game type. The module continued to get updates through 2014, with the addition of a racing mode and other fixes in September. By December, Arena Commander had reached version 1.0 and was considered a "significant milestone" for the project.

==== Star Marine ====
Star Marine was considered the "FPS module" for Star Citizen. The module was announced at PAX Australia 2014 with a projected release date in 2015. The development of Star Marine was contracted out to the Colorado-based third-party studio IllFonic. Initially, the module was set to include features like teams starting within a ship and needing to fly to a space station to begin their engagements and much more EVA-based gameplay including the disabling of gravity during matches. However, close to being finished, CIG found that the assets that were built for the module weren't at the same scale as those built for the rest of the game. By August 2015, the contract was terminated and development of Star Marine returned to an in-house team at Cloud Imperium Games.

The issues plaguing Star Marine's development caused significant delays, pushing the release beyond the originally expected 2015 release date. Just prior to the module being pulled from Illfonic, outlets began reporting that the module was "delayed indefinitely" or "cancelled".

During development in 2015, a game type called SATA Ball was announced, an in-game sport where players would be split up into two teams and would fight each other in a zero-gravity environment. It has yet to be implemented in the game. During an episode of Ask the Devs (Cloud Imperium's semi-weekly informative video series), it was revealed that SATABall had been designed to test zero-g traversal mechanics, and with the introduction of the Persistent Universe the game mode had become redundant.

The module was released on December 23, 2016, a year after its original projected release date.

=== Persistent Universe ===
While the previous modules were primarily focused on a single aspect of gameplay, the release of Star Citizen's Alpha 2.0 version, initially known as Crusader, was a combination of gameplay elements found in earlier modules. Its initial release was on December 11, 2015, a year after the Star Citizen project was originally planned for completion. Later retitled as "Universe", the module became the primary focus of development on Star Citizen, with future updates focused on implementing content to this mode.

Star Citizen's Alpha 3.0, considered to be a major milestone, was announced for a December 2016 release at Gamescom 2016. Two months later, in October 2016 at the annual CitizenCon event, Cloud Imperium Games claimed that Alpha 3.0 would be split into four smaller releases. When December arrived, Cloud Imperium Games made a surprise announcement that they would be migrating Star Citizen to the Amazon Lumberyard engine. Alpha 3.0 wouldn't release until December 2017, and following its release the developers implemented a public roadmap that would show features and content that was in development for the future.

As development continued, Cloud Imperium Games began releasing more features in incremental versions that built on Alpha 3.0. Early updates focused on implementing initial gameplay mechanics specific to the Persistent Universe module and efforts to stabilize the "barely playable" Alpha 3.0 update. Face-over-IP technology was implemented in Alpha 3.3, which was built in partnership with FaceWare Technologies. Feature additions continued through 2019 as Cloud Imperium Games adopted a quarterly schedule for providing updates to the module, though concerns over its lengthy development continued.

During the development of Star Citizen's Alpha 3.8 update, the developers discussed their implementation of a technology known as Object Container Streaming. Due to the scale of the game, challenges arose wherein the project would run into memory limitations on both the client and the server side of the Persistent Universe. While they had released a client-side version of Object Container Streaming in December 2018, a server-side version had been in development to alleviate those limitations even further. The developers noted that a server-side implementation would alleviate existing limitations with the project and said that, if completed, it would be "one of the biggest technological milestones this game has seen to date." With the release of Alpha 3.18 update, the game experienced major outages.

=== Delays and extended development ===
During the 2012 crowdfunding campaign, Chris Roberts suggested that the game might be released in 2014. At the time, Roberts said that "Really, it's all about constant iteration from launch. The whole idea is to be constantly updating. It isn't like the old days where you had to have everything and the kitchen sink in at launch because you weren't going to come back to it for awhile. We're already one year in – another two years puts us at 3 total which is ideal. Any more and things would begin to get stale."

As development progressed, key features were continually pushed from their projected release dates. The Arena Commander module, originally scheduled for December 2013, was delayed six months to its initial June 2014 release. Star Marine, originally scheduled for a 2015 release, was delayed until December 2016. An update to the game's Persistent Universe module, Alpha 3.0, was delayed from December 2016 to December 2017. Star Citizen Alpha 3.0 was considered by the developer a release in early access. Since Star Citizen Alpha 3.0's release, no official dates have been set for the end of early access, though it continues to receive updates.

Squadron 42, the now-standalone single player component of the game, was initially scheduled for the project's initial 2014 release, but suffered from delays as well. After it missed the 2014 release window, a release window in 2016 was suggested before the project was "delayed indefinitely". In 2018, Cloud Imperium Games announced a plan to enter the beta stage of Squadron 42's development before the end of the first quarter of 2020, but that date was later pushed back to the end of the second quarter of 2020. The beta was later pushed back again, to the third quarter of 2020, which passed with no news until on 10 October Chris Roberts stated that "We still have a ways to go before we are in beta".

As the project continued to delay key features and miss projected deadlines, the media began to suggest that the game may become vaporware and might never be released. Many of these delays were blamed on micromanagement of the project by key members of Cloud Imperium Games, and criticisms of feature creep plagued the project. Comparisons were made between Star Citizen and Elite: Dangerous, another crowdfunded space flight simulation game announced at about the same time and released in 2014.

In November 2021, Cloud Imperium announced it would be opening a new office in Manchester to open in May 2022. Upon opening, it would become the company's UK headquarters and 400 people from the Wilmslow office would relocate to Manchester. At the end of January 2024, live game director Todd Papy, along with several other lead staff members, left the company as part of a restructuring connected to the company's office relocation.

Preceding their annual CitizenCon event in October 2024, CIG was reported to have mandated a 7-day work week for employees working on deliverables for the event. The goal of this two-week crunch period was reportedly to finish the 3.24.2 update for the Persistent Universe and a gameplay demonstration of Squadron 42, which was shown on stage at CitizenCon 2954 on 19 October. Employees were promised 12 hours of time off in lieu per week to be made available after the release of Squadron 42 on the condition that they still worked at the company at the time.

=== Funding ===
==== Crowdfunding and early access sales ====
The developers of Star Citizen began crowdfunding in 2012, on their own website and Kickstarter. Funding quickly surpassed initial target goals and subsequently additional stretch goals have been added to the funding campaign, most promising more or expanded content at release.

At initial pledge campaign end, the total pledge amount was above all goals initially set by Cloud Imperium Games and reached US$6.2 million. In mid-2013, with US$15 million raised in less than a year, Star Citizen became the "most-funded crowdfunding project anywhere". In 2014, Guinness World Records listed the sum of US$39,680,576 pledged on Star Citizen's website as the "largest single amount ever raised via crowdsourcing". During the 2014 Gamescom event on August 15, Chris Roberts announced the crowdfunding campaign had surpassed US$50 million. On May 19, 2017, crowdfunding surpassed $150 million. In addition to crowdfunding, funding for the game's development has continued through a variety of in-game transactions and subscriptions.

In January 2017, when asked about the financial situation of Star Citizen, Chris Roberts said: "I'm not worried, because even if no money came in, we would have sufficient funds to complete Squadron 42. The revenue from this could in-turn be used for the completion of Star Citizen." For contributing to the project's funding, backers receive virtual rewards in the form of tiered pledge packages, which include a spaceship and credits to buy additional equipment and to cover initial costs in the virtual economy, like fuel and rental fees, but according to the developers, players will be able to earn all backer rewards in the game itself, with the exception of certain cosmetic items and Lifetime Insurance (LTI), without having to spend additional money.

Crowdfunding from backers exceeded US$170 million by December 2017 when Star Citizen released in early access. Since then, the developer has not stated a clear split of crowdfund based revenues and straight early access sales so the total crowdfund figure is unclear. Combined regular sales from early access and original crowdfunding total exceeded $300 million in June 2020, surpassed $400 million in November 2021,, $500 million in September 2022, and $1 billion in May 2026. The current number of paying players is unknown, as it does not equal the advertised counter 'Star Citizens'.

==== Private funding ====
Billionaire Clive Calder purchased a 10 percent stake in Cloud Imperium Games for US$46 million in December 2018, placing the company at a $460 million valuation, regarding which TechCrunch commented, "One may very well question the sanity of such a valuation for a company that has not yet shipped an actual product." In addition to the stake, Clive and his son, Keith Calder, gained board seats at Cloud Imperium. In March 2020 an additional $17.25 million investment was received, raising total private funding to $63.25 million.

Due to United Kingdom financial disclosure laws, Cloud Imperium Games released financials for parts of the company. The documents revealed that in 5 years of development, from 2012 to 2017, the company had spent US$193 million and reserved $14 million. CIG financials for UK in 2020 revealed that it had paid about £1 million in dividends to shareholders.

CIG financial disclosure for 2022 in the UK, posted in March 2024, includes further details regarding the terms of this external investment in Note 28 of the report. The investment carries a put option that allows investors to recover their investment plus interest at certain time windows during 2024, 2025 and 2028. In the same financial disclosure CIG estimates this liability at £47.8 million for the part of the external investment in the UK business. Since Clive Calder's investment was performed in equal measure in the US side of the CIG business, further estimates quantify the total liability by CIG, owing to investors around $130 million overall if these were to call their put options.

== Grey market ==
In 2014, Eurogamer reported that a grey market had arisen from Star Citizen's funding practices, specifically the sale of limited-run ships and the inability for players to sell ships among themselves. Several people began to act as middle-men to process transactions between players wanting to sell or trade ships, which became more prevalent after changes to in-game ship insurance mechanics on newly sold ships. Cloud Imperium Games made changes to the project's "gifting system", announcing, "In order to eliminate the middleman scam, packages will be giftable only once before they are locked to an account." Middlemen moved around this restriction by primarily dealing with the fiscal side of the transaction and allowing the actual parties to exchange their goods. According to the report, "Chris Roberts expresses no desire to clamp down on the Star Citizen grey market".

== Reception ==
=== Reactions from the press ===
In a 2016 Polygon opinion article, Charlie Hall compared Star Citizen to No Man's Sky and Elite: Dangerous, writing that "Last time I checked, Star Citizen writ large was a hope wrapped inside a dream buried inside a few layers of controversy", while stating that each game has something different to offer within the space sim genre. PC Gamer writer Luke Winkie also compared Star Citizen to No Man's Sky, describing Star Citizen as "the other super ambitious, controversial space sim on the horizon", and indicating that fans of the genre, disappointed in No Man's Sky were turning to the as-yet-unfinished Star Citizen, while sometimes expressing concerns should the latter fail to deliver.

The game's developers have attracted criticism for continuing to raise funds enthusiastically while failing to meet project deadlines, as well as doubts about technical feasibility and the ability of the developers to finish the game.

Between September and October 2015, The Escapist magazine wrote a pair of highly controversial articles citing various sources who claimed that the project was in trouble. After Roberts wrote a scathing response to the articles, Cloud Imperium Games threatened the site and its owners with legal action which never materialized. In March 2017, Derek Smart wrote that both parties had settled the matter out of court. The statement from Defy Media reads "In response to your request for comment, I can share that CIG and The Escapist have mutually agreed to delete their comments about each other. We wish each other well and look forward to better relations in 2017". The article later came in third (tied) for an award by the Society of Professional Journalists.

In September 2016, Kotaku UK wrote a five-part series about the various controversies surrounding the project. One article in the series was related to a long-rumored feud between Smart and Roberts. In December 2016, Star Citizen was the recipient of Wired's 2016 Vaporware Awards. Massively OP awarded the game its "Most Likely to Flop" award for both 2016 and 2017.

Rock Paper Shotgun reviewed version Alpha 2.0 and wrote: "There's not really anything to do there yet, but they've made the place, and it's an appealing place for sure." Sound & Vision reviewed version Alpha 2.6 and wrote: "[...] is it worth spending $35 now to play around in the limited (but growing) game universe. I think so."

=== Reactions from the public ===
Ongoing online disputes exist over the scope of the project, the project's funding, as well as the project's ability to eventually deliver on promises. Some writers have been the subject of e-mail attacks for their coverage of the project. At least one popular YouTube personality was allegedly sent death threats by a fan of the game.

In July 2015, independent game designer Derek Smart, one of the original early backers of the project in 2012, wrote a blog post in which he claimed that due to the project's increased scope and lack of adequate technology, that it could never be completed as pitched. Following the blog post and widespread news coverage, Cloud Imperium Games refunded him and canceled his account. In August 2015 via his attorneys, Smart sent a demand letter to Cloud Imperium Games asking for the promised accounting records for backer money, a release date, and a refund option for all backers no longer willing to support the game. CIG's co-founder and general counsel Ortwin Freyermuth characterized Smart's claims as "defamatory" and "entirely without merit". Smart has continued to be critical of the project following his refund.

Virtual land claims, a feature that had not yet been implemented in the game, were announced for sale in 2017, which attracted criticism from both the press and the public. Concerns regarding the mechanic's lack of availability and potential pay-to-win advantages were raised. In response, Cloud Imperium Games wrote, "People that own claim licenses now, during the anniversary sale to support development, and people that earn the money in-game to buy one will be on equal footing assuming they have enough UEC, especially as there will be millions of locations for people to explore and claim within the Universe over the lifetime of the game."

In August 2018, Cloud Imperium Games attempted to monetize the live stream broadcast of the project's annual CitizenCon event, eventually backing down due to online protestations. Later on, they removed a cap on in-game currency, resulting in renewed criticism over the game's pay-to-win mechanics.

== Legal issues ==
=== Refunds and policy changes ===
As early as 2015, some Star Citizen backers began requesting refunds from Cloud Imperium Games. According to Polygon, "an internal survey posted on the Star Citizen message boards revealed as many as 25 percent of the game's backers expressing an interest in a process for getting their money back. The survey received 1,173 responses." Initially, refunds were being processed on a case-by-case basis. On June 10, 2016, the terms of service had been amended to remove a passage regarding refund eligibility. In the previous terms of service, backers could procure a refund if the game had not been released within 18 months of its original estimated delivery date. The revision changed the terms to reflect that backers could only procure refunds if the project was abandoned by developers. Exceptions to this change covered backers who spent money prior to the terms change and stated that they would retain the 18-month clause if they pursued a refund. A month later, it was reported that a backer filed a formal complaint to both the Los Angeles County District Attorney and the Los Angeles County Department of Consumer and Business Affairs after his attempts to gain a refund failed following the terms of service change. The backer stated that they had initially been interested in the project for its virtual reality support, which would help them enjoy the game with their disability. Upon postponement of virtual reality support and changes to the terms of service, the backer stated it was "the straw that broke the camel's back for me." The DCBA investigator assigned to the case made an arrangement with Cloud Imperium Games to process the US$2,550 refund as the backer had not downloaded the game client and therefore not accepted the revised terms of service.

Additional cases regarding Star Citizen refunds have received attention from the media. A hoax perpetrated by an anonymous Redditor in September 2017 claimed that they had worked over the course of five weeks to procure a US$45,000 refund, was reported by Ars Technica and forced the outlet to retract the story after it was disproven. A few months later, in December, it was reported that a backer had spent almost three months requesting a US$24,000 refund and had initiated a small claims court case against Cloud Imperium Games. In the same report, a second backer stated they were attempting to receive a US$16,700 refund from the project. The first case was forwarded to the Better Business Bureau.

Following a discussion with the Better Business Bureau, Cloud Imperium Games made changes to their website and further revised their terms of service. Site changes were designed to more clearly communicate the state of the project, define the purchase as a "pledge", and "inform potential buyers there may be product delivery delays and to check the roadmap site before they choose to click the final OK box and provide payment." The new terms of service opened refund requests to a 14-day "cancellation period", but Cloud Imperium Games claimed that they also maintained a company policy to refund backers within 30 days.

In July 2018, a backer initiated a small claims court case against Cloud Imperium Games to refund US$4,496. It was reported that he had "grown disillusioned with the title's numerous delays, broken promises, and changes in scope". He argued that changes to the game would limit his ability to play due to disability. In court, Cloud Imperium Games argued that the backer's involvement in an early tester program called "Evocati" proved that they were actively providing a product to him. When an arbitration clause from the project's terms of service was brought up, the backer argued that he was covered under the original terms of service as he had backed the project prior to changes to the terms of service. Cloud Imperium Games provided evidence that a "vast majority" of the backer's purchases were made after the change and that he would have had to accept the revised terms of service when making any new purchase. The judge presiding the case sided with Cloud Imperium Games and ruled against the backer. In a Forbes magazine report from May 2019, it was alleged that the backer continued to purchase ships after the lawsuit was closed. The same report noted that a Freedom of Information Act request had shown that the U.S. Federal Trade Commission had received 129 complaints concerning Cloud Imperium Games.

=== Crytek lawsuit ===
Crytek, the developers of CryEngine, filed a lawsuit in December 2017 for copyright infringement and breach of contract against Cloud Imperium Games. Specific complaints by Crytek include that Cloud Imperium Games continued to use CryEngine after the announced migration to Amazon Lumberyard, failure to disclose modifications to CryEngine, using the same engine for two separate products instead of one, and improper removal of the CryEngine logo from game materials. The initial complaint asked for direct and indirect damages as well as a permanent injunction against further use of the CryEngine in any Star Citizen or Squadron 42 materials. Cloud Imperium Games called the lawsuit "meritless", while Crytek stated that it had "been left with no option but to protect its intellectual property in court.”

As the lawsuit continued, Cloud Imperium Games argued that Crytek was "selectively" and "misleadingly" appropriating the agreements made between the two companies. Cloud Imperium Games further asserted that exclusive use of the engine did not extend to a "requirement to use that engine", and that the original agreement barred "either party from seeking damages".

Cloud Imperium Games asked the court to dismiss the lawsuit in January 2018 which in August that year was denied by the judge, with an exception of a single claim and the pursuit of punitive damages. However, in December 2018, the judge dismissed claims regarding Cloud Imperium Games' right to use another game engine and their obligation to promote CryEngine.

After an additional year of litigation, Crytek filed a motion to dismiss the lawsuit without prejudice or legal fees in January 2020 with an option to resume the lawsuit following the release of Squadron 42. Cloud Imperium Games countered with a motion to dismiss with US$500,000 in legal expenses paid by Crytek. During the dismissal motions, Cloud Imperium Games submitted an email sent from Amazon to Crytek in May 2019, stating that the company granted a license to its Lumberyard engine in 2016, which included rights to CryEngine in their license agreement.

In February 2020, Crytek and Cloud Imperium Games filed for a settlement proposal, with a 30-day request to file a joint dismissal of the lawsuit with undisclosed terms. The annual report published by Cloud Imperium Games in early 2021 revealed that Cloud Imperium Games acquired a license for CryEngine from Crytek in 2020.

=== UK Advertising Standards Authority ruling ===
In September 2021, a customer complaint to the United Kingdom's Advertising Standards Authority (ASA) was upheld. It cited a lack of transparency in marketing emails from Cloud Imperium Games regarding email promotions for vessels in development. The ASA asked Cloud Imperium Games to make it clearer that "concept ships" for sale are not yet available in the game, which resulted in Star Citizen marketing emails including a disclaimer warning potential customers about the nature of concept ships.

== See also ==
- List of most expensive video games to develop
- List of highest-funded crowdfunding projects
- List of space flight simulation games
