= Joseph D. Oliver House =

Historic house in Indiana, United States

- U.S. National Register of Historic Places
- U.S. Historic district – Contributing property
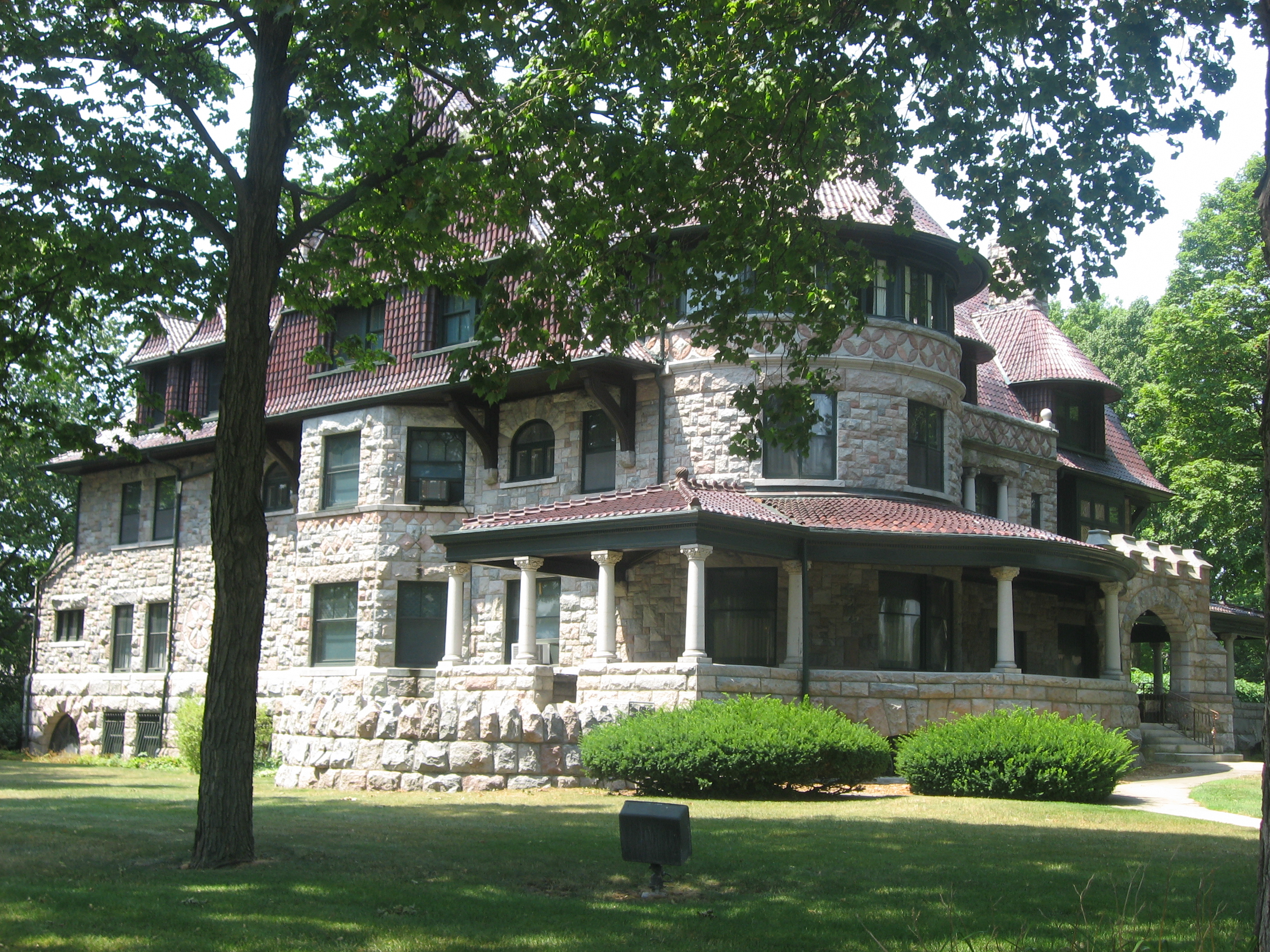
- Front and side of the house

- Location within Indiana Location within the United States
- Location: 808 W. Washington Ave., South Bend, Indiana
- Coordinates: 41°40′33″N 86°15′44″W
- Area: 2.6 acres (1.1 ha)
- Built: 1895
- Architect: Lamb & Rich; Alice E. Neale
- Architectural style: Queen Anne
- Part of: West Washington Historic District (ID75000049)
- NRHP reference No.: 73000043
- Added to NRHP: August 28, 1973

The Joseph D. Oliver House, also known as Copshaholm, sits on 808 W. Washington Street, at the corner of Chapin Street in South Bend, Indiana. The mansion was built for the Oliver family, founders of the Oliver Chilled Plow Works, and named after the Scottish village of the patriarch. It is listed on the National Register of Historic Places.

Built in 1895–96, Copshaholm is a 38-room Romanesque Queen Anne house designed by New York architect Charles Alonzo Rich. The furnishings on all three floors are original, giving visitors a glimpse of how the mansion appeared during the 72 years the Oliver family had occupancy.

Oak, cherry and mahogany woodwork are found throughout Copshaholm. Leaded glass windows and 14 unique fireplaces add to the beauty of the house. The furnishings include porcelains, glass, silver, prints, and bronzes, including some by Bartolozzi and Lorado Taft. The furniture is all original and display beautiful antiques.

Surrounding Copshaholm are 2.5 acres (10,000 m^{2}) of landscaped gardens, including a garden tea house, formal Italianate garden, rose garden, pergola, tennis lawn, and fountain.

== Design ==
The house was designed by Lamb and Rich (1882–1903) of New York City. It is a Queen Anne style with substantial Romanesque features. The pergola and Italian sunken garden were designed by Alice E. Neale of New York City. The House is three floor with an attic. The basement and first two levels are Indiana fieldstone granite, culled from the countryside of St. Joseph County. The porch pillars are Vermont stone. The third floor and the attic are sheathed in tile. The roof is a simple ridge with gable ends and a tower on the northeast corner. On the back is a projecting gable with dormer windows The music room and den are separate one story projections.

The house was originally wired for electricity and piped for gas. The gas has been removed, but several of the gas jets remain in place. The original water system consisted of two wells. The water was pumped to a holding tank in the attic and the gravity lines serviced all the baths, kitchen, and laundry. This system is still used today, using in holding tanks.

== Bibliography ==
- Burlingame, Roger; March of the Iron Men, 1938
- Delaney, J.J.; "The Beginnings of Industrial South Bend," M.A. Dissertation, Notre Dame: (1951)
- Esslinger, D.R.; "The Urbanization of South Bend's Immigrant 1850-1880" (Ph.D. Dissertation, Notre Dame: 1972)
- Kaempffert, Waldemar; A Popular History of American Invention (1924); Anderson and Cooley, South Bend and the Men Who Made It (1901)
- "James Oliver," Dictionary of American Biography; D.L. Meikle, "James Oliver and the Oliver Chilled Plow Works," (Ph.D. Dissertation, Indiana Univ; 1958);
- Shannon, Fred; The Farmer's Last Frontier, 1865-1900 (1945); R. L. Ardrey, American Agricultural Implements (1894); John W. Oliver, History of American Technology (1956)
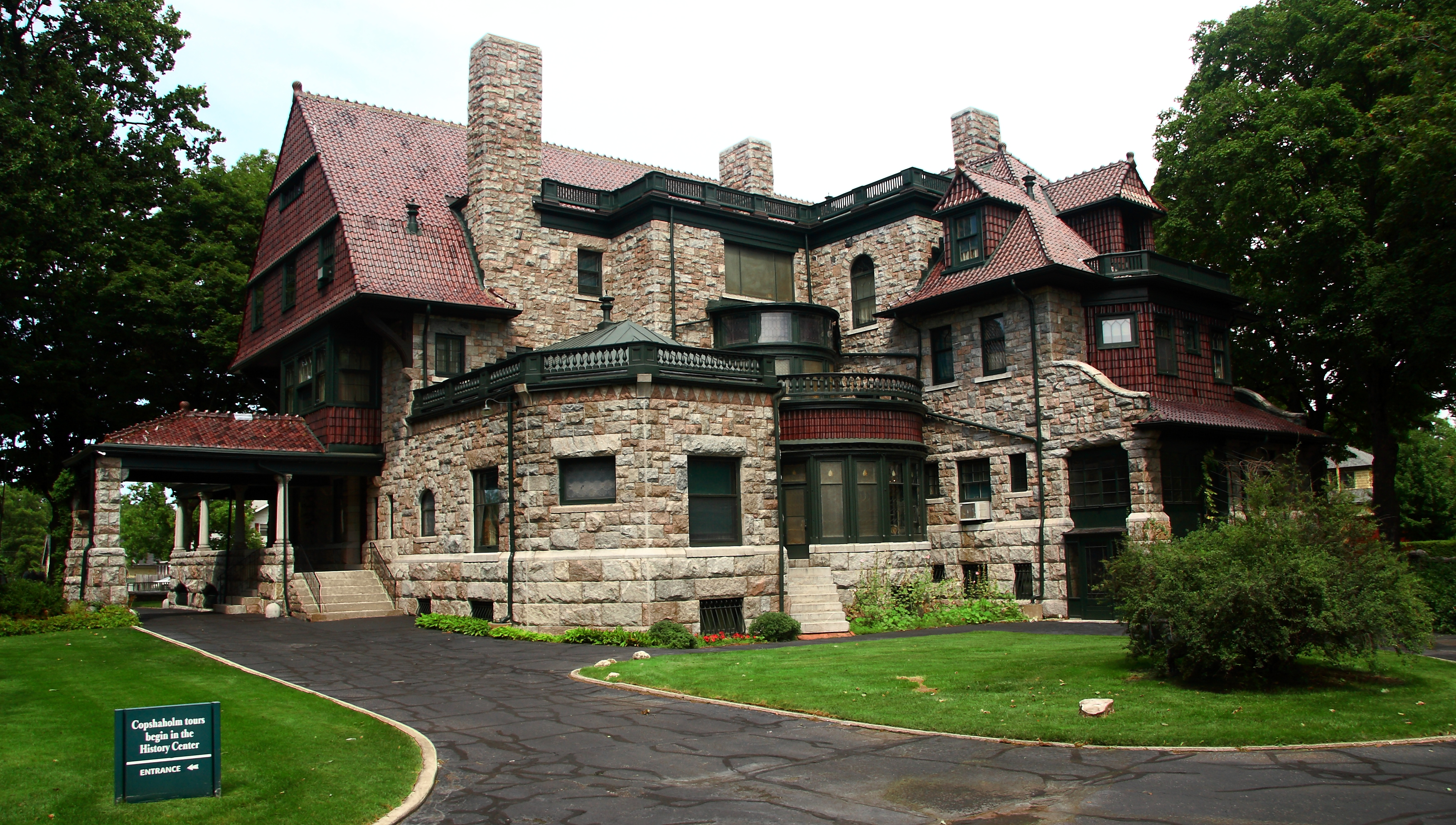
The Oliver Mansion

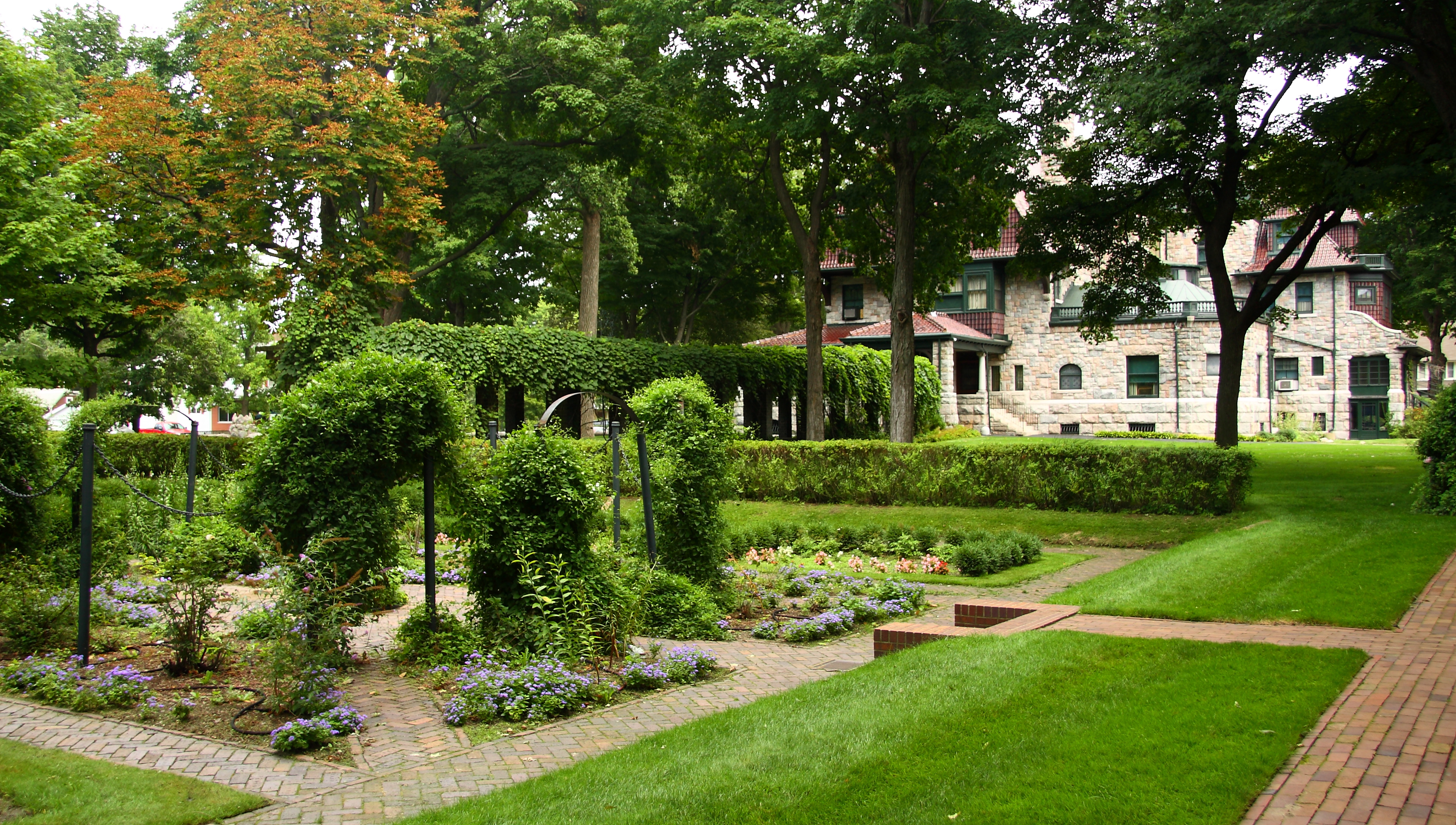
The gardens of the Oliver Mansion

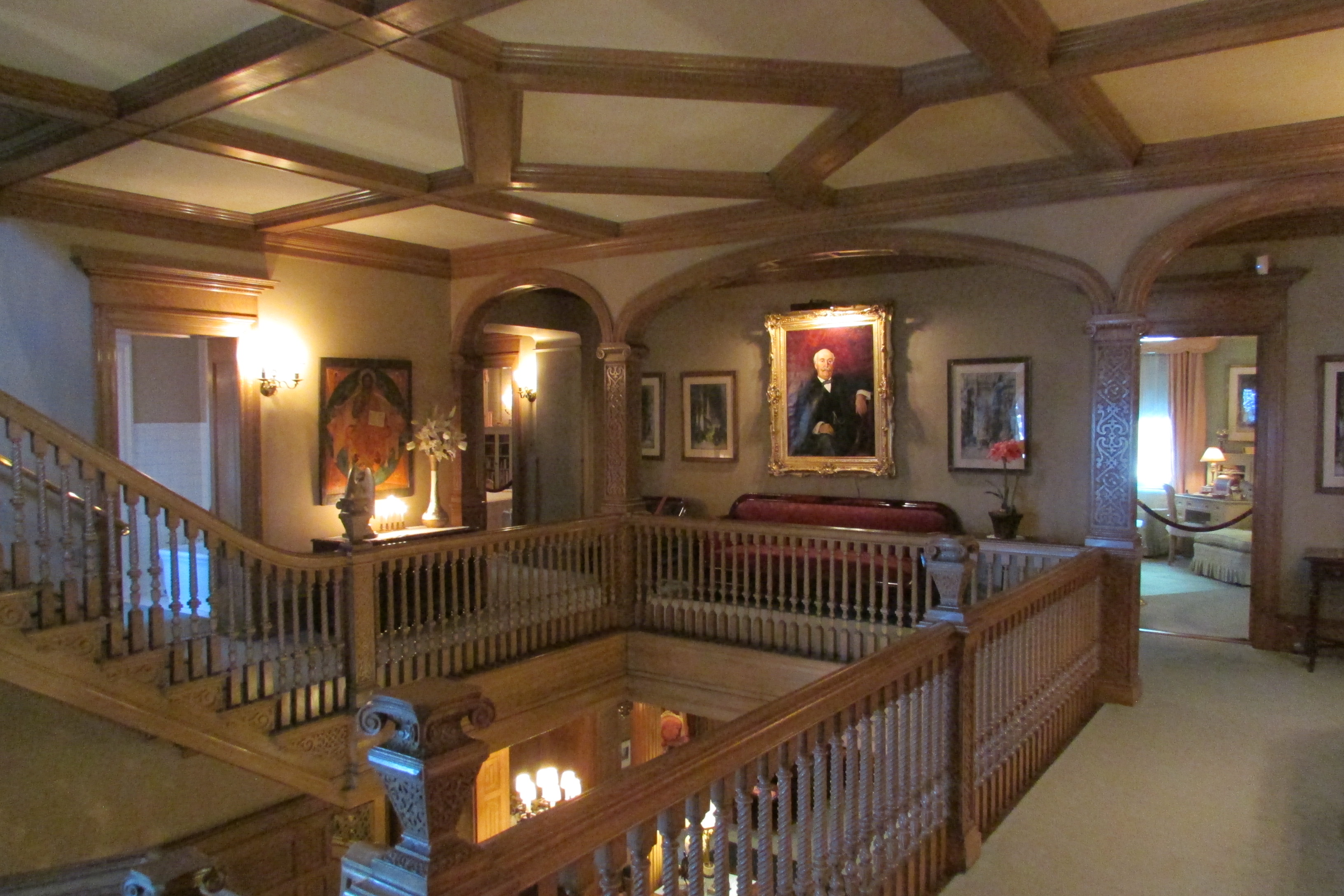
Second Floor central atrium

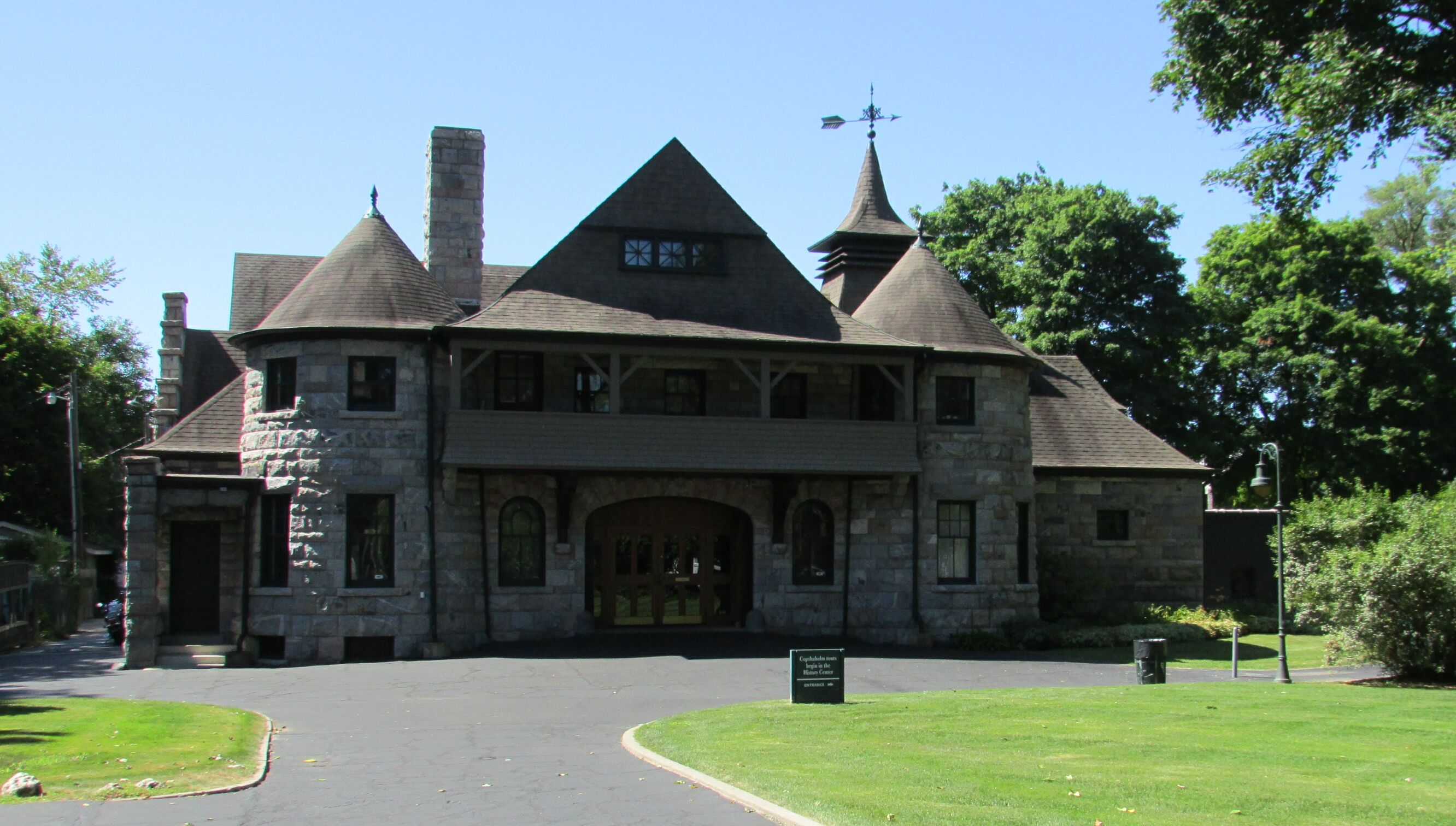
Carriage house

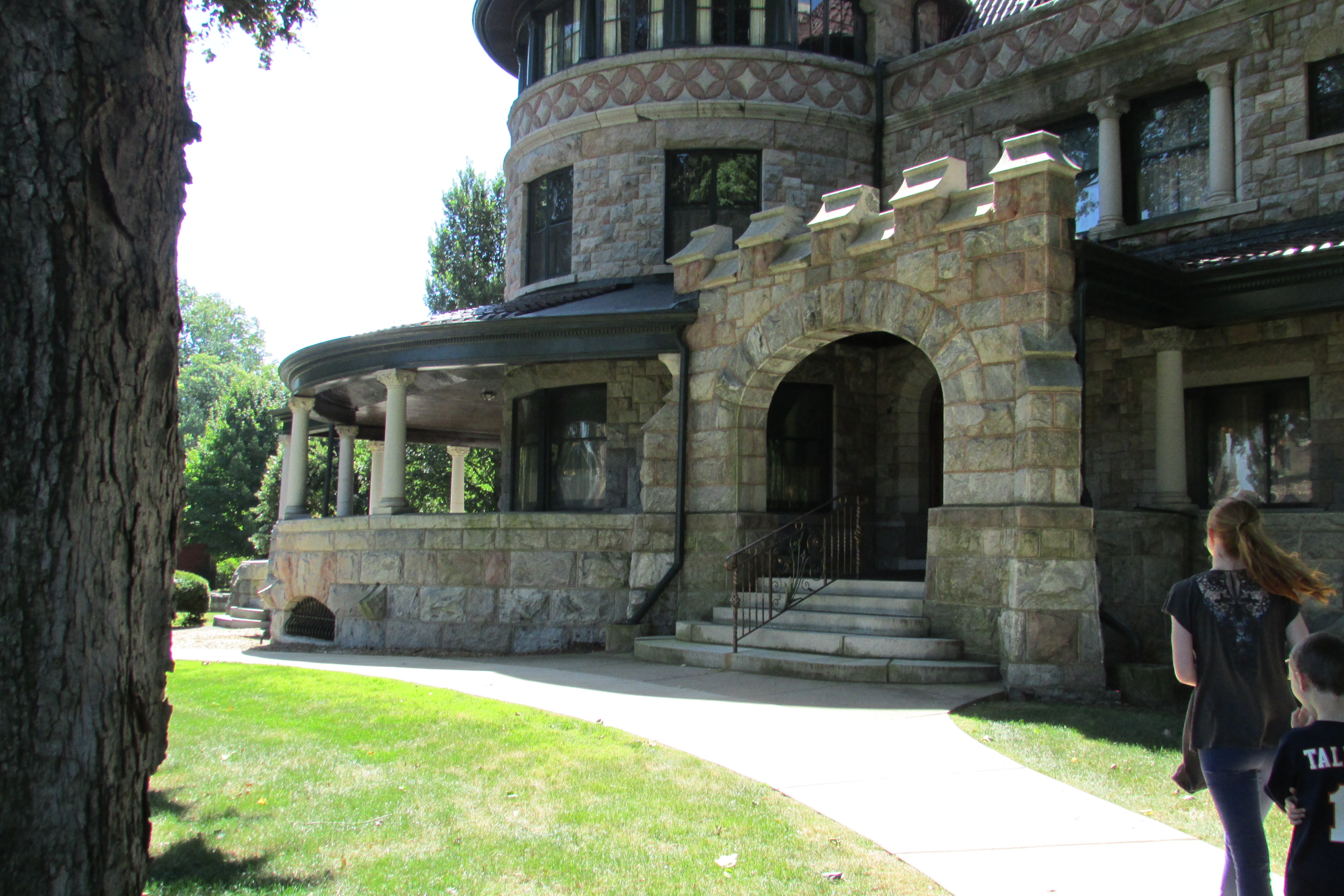
Front walk and porch
