= Capella Films =

American film production company

Capella Films, Inc.
- Type: Corporation
- Industry: Film
- Founded: March 26, 1990
- Defunct: 2012
- Successor: Bloom Media
- Headquarters: Beverly Hills, California, Los Angeles, California, United States
- Area served: Worldwide
- Key people: Rolf Deyhle & Will Baer (co-founders); Mark Seiler/Ortwin Freyermuth (CEO); David Ishag (COO)
- Products: Motion Pictures
- Divisions: Capella International

Capella Films, Inc. was an American film production company founded in 1990 and headquartered in Los Angeles, California. Formed by Hamburg-based Deyhle-Baer Media Holdings, Capella Films constituted the production branch to Capella Intl. which specialised in foreign distribution.

Together, Capella Films and Capella Intl. operated a highly active production and distribution hub whose partners included Universal Studios, German distributor, Connexion Films, American production arm, Connexion American Media Inc., Bregman-Baer Productions (a company co-owned by Martin Bregman and Willi Baer), and April-Connexion Films. Capella Films, Inc. formed a $1.3billion acquisition attempt for Metro-Goldwyn-Mayer/United Artists in 1996. The company was later merged into Bloom Media in 2012. This company is also not to be confused with Russian film company Capella Film.

== Organization ==
Capella Films and Capella International company principals were responsible for the financing, and/or production, distribution, acquiring of full international or selective territorial rights for the following motion pictures; Austin Powers: International Man of Mystery starring Mike Myers, Ace Ventura: Pet Detective, The Mask, and Dumb and Dumber all of which starred Canadian born actor Jim Carrey, Brian De Palma's Carlito's Way starring Al Pacino, and The Real McCoy starring Kim Basinger. Capella Intl. emphasized alternating foreign distribution rights with Universal, which handled a number of their domestic distribution releases during the early nineties. The company maintained layers of relationships, both contractual and personal, with distributors to the extent that they were essentially co-producers on many exterior films, meaning the net result was profitable ties to selected partners that bypassed the traditional bidding wars that usually accompanied foreign distribution deals. Critically, the company was structured around occupying multiple sites in the production and distribution chain, in order to better control the development and flow of product and revenue, and thereby operate more profitably than their competitors.

== Motion pictures ==
Capella Films and Capella International company principals were responsible for the financing, and/or production, acquiring of full international or selective territorial rights for the following motion pictures:

- Drop Dead Gorgeous (1999)
- Austin Powers: International Man of Mystery (1997)
- A Business Affair (1994)
- My Life (1993)
- Nobody's Fool (1995)
- The Real McCoy (1993)
- The Russian Singer (1993)
- Shattered (1991)
- The Surgeon (1995)
- Two Bits (1995)
