= South Bend Remedy Company Building =

- U.S. National Register of Historic Places
- U.S. Historic district – Contributing property
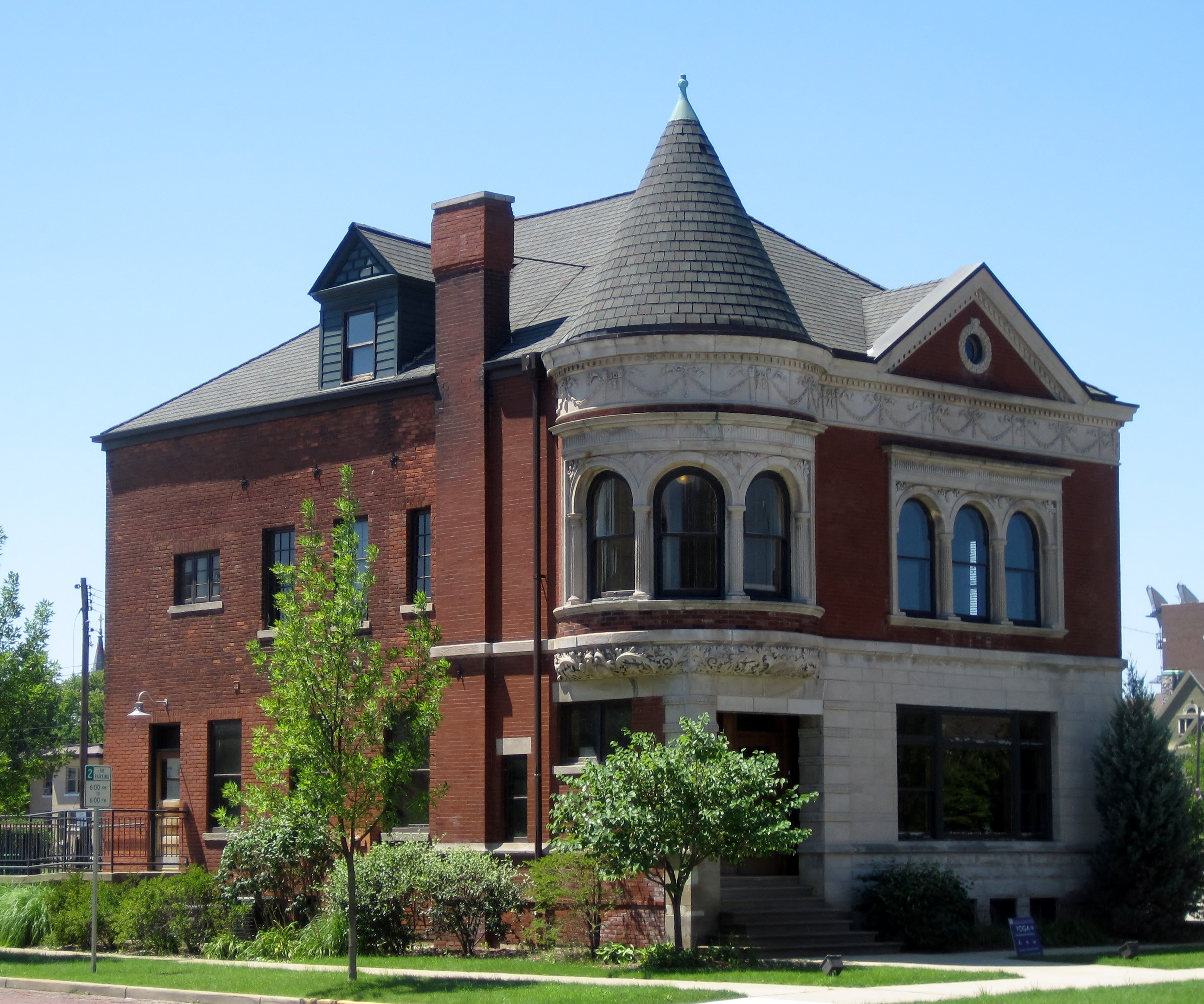
- South Bend Remedy Company Building, July 2012

- Location within Indiana Location within the United States
- Location: 402 W. Washington St., South Bend, Indiana
- Coordinates: 41°40′34″N 86°15′18.5″W
- Area: less than one acre
- Built: 1895, 1988, 2003
- Architectural style: Classical Revival, Queen Anne
- MPS: Downtown South Bend Historic MRA
- NRHP reference No.: 85001228, 01000993
- Added to NRHP: June 5, 1985, September 16, 2001

South Bend Remedy Company Building is a historic building located at South Bend, Indiana. It was built in 1895, and is a two-story, transitional Queen Anne / Classical Revival style brick and limestone building. It features a recessed entrance, round turret topped by a conical roof, and a wide frieze band of garlands and torches. It was built to house the offices and laboratory for the South Bend Remedy Company, a mail order patent medicine business. It was moved to 501 W. Colfax Ave. in 1988, and then to 402 W. Washington St. in 2003.

It was listed on the National Register of Historic Places in 1985 and again in 2001. It is located in the West Washington Historic District.
