= North Pumping Station =

- U.S. National Register of Historic Places
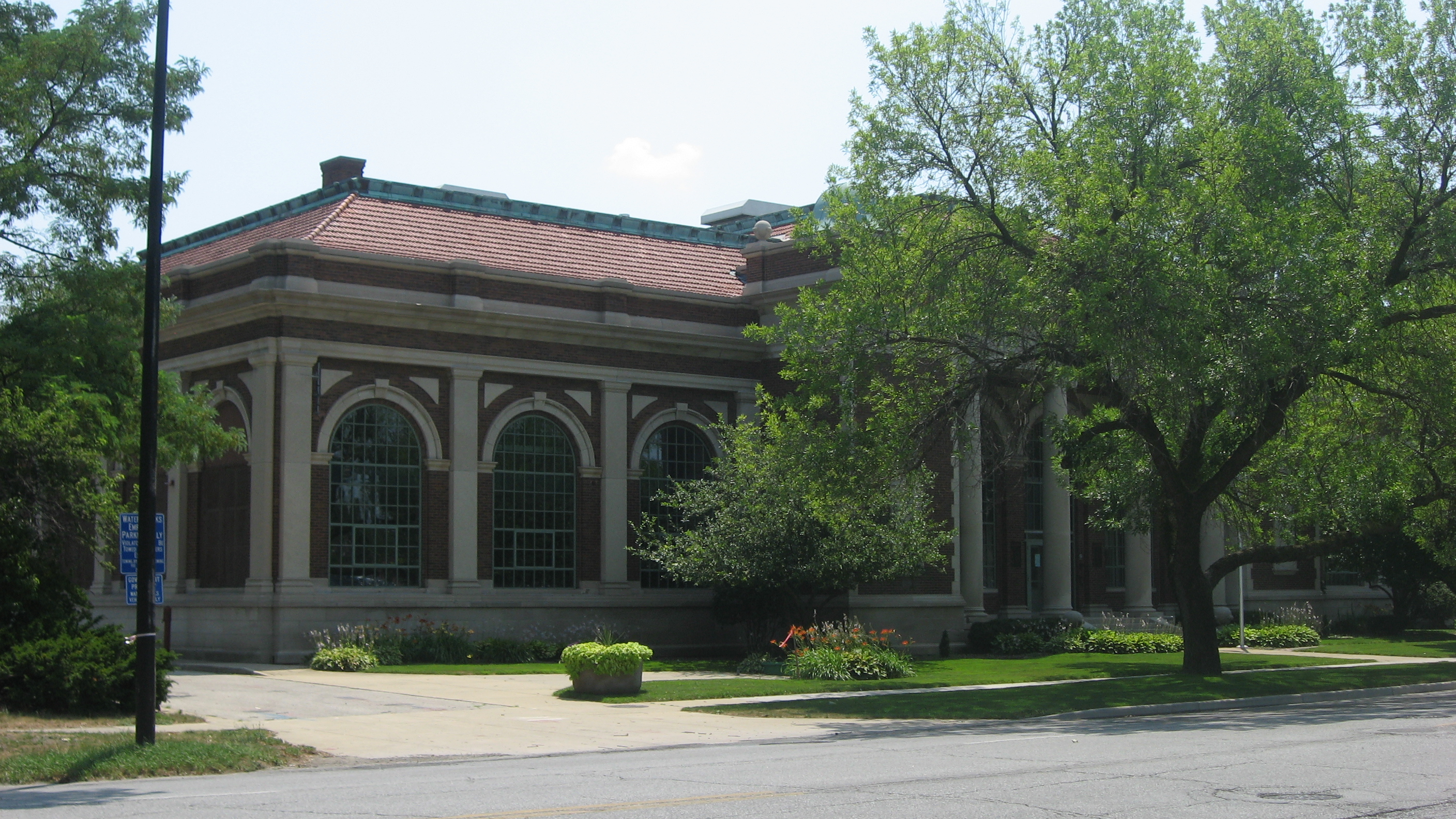
- North Pumping Station, July 2012

- Location within Indiana Location within the United States
- Location: 830 N. Michigan Ave., South Bend, Indiana
- Coordinates: 41°41′10″N 86°15′1″W
- Area: less than one acre
- Built: 1912
- Architect: Freyemuth & Maurer
- Architectural style: Classical Revival
- NRHP reference No.: 96001538
- Added to NRHP: January 2, 1997

North Pumping Station is a historic pumping station located at South Bend, Indiana. The main building was built in 1912, and is a one-story, rectangular, Classical Revival style brick building. It has a red tile hipped roof and rests on a limestone foundation. It features a projecting entrance pavilion with a pedimented colonnade of four limestone Ionic order columns and limestone trimmed arched window openings.

It was listed on the National Register of Historic Places in 1997.
