= The Real McCoy (film) =

- Theatrical release poster
- Directed by: Russell Mulcahy
- Written by: William Davies; William Osborne
- Produced by: Martin Bregman; Willi Baer; Michael S. Bregman
- Starring: Kim Basinger; Val Kilmer; Terence Stamp
- Cinematography: Denis Crossan
- Edited by: Peter Honess
- Music by: Brad Fiedel
- Production companies: Bregman/Baer Productions, inc.
- Distributed by: Universal Pictures (USA & Canada); Capella International (International)
- Release date: September 10, 1993
- Running time: 105 minutes
- Country: United States
- Budget: $24 million
- Box office: $6.4 million

The Real McCoy is a 1993 American heist crime film, directed by Russell Mulcahy and starring Kim Basinger, Val Kilmer and Terence Stamp.

== Plot ==
Karen McCoy, a renowned bank robber, is released from prison after serving six years and resolves to lead a law-abiding life. Upon returning home, she discovers that her ex-husband has told their young son, Patrick, that she died, further complicating her efforts to reconnect with him. Despite her determination to go straight, Karen is subjected to harassment from her corrupt parole officer, Gary Buckner, and faces difficulty securing honest employment.

Karen's former employer, Jack Schmidt, reappears and pressures her to participate in a heist targeting a highly secure bank. When she refuses, Schmidt and Buckner kidnap Patrick to coerce her involvement. Karen eventually agrees and begins planning the robbery with the assistance of J.T. Barker, a small-time criminal who admires her legacy.

Using a strategic approach involving repeated false alarms to desensitize bank security, Karen carries out the robbery. She successfully opens the vault and retrieves the money but refuses to hand it over to Schmidt. Instead, she turns the tables on Schmidt and Buckner, exposing their illegal activities and rescuing her son. The film concludes with Karen and Patrick escaping together, leaving behind her criminal past.

== Cast ==
- Kim Basinger as Karen McCoy
- Val Kilmer as J.T. Barker
- Terence Stamp as Jack Schmidt
- Gailard Sartain as Gary Buckner
- Zach English as Patrick
- Deborah Hobart as Cheryl Sweeney
- Pamela J. Hobart as Kelly
- Andy Stahl as Mr. Kroll
- Dean Rader-Duval as Lewis
- Norman Maxwell as Hoke
- Marc Macaulay as Karl
- Nick Searcy as Roy Sweeney

== Reception ==
=== Box office ===
The Real McCoy grossed $6,484,246 in the United States, with no international showings. In its first weekend the film grossed $2,705,425, which was 41.7% of the film's total earnings.

=== Critical response ===
The film earned negative reviews from critics. The Real McCoy holds an 25% rating on Rotten Tomatoes based on 16 reviews, with an average rating of 4.13/10. Roger Ebert of the Chicago Sun-Times gave it 2 stars, saying, "... "The Real McCoy" took me back to... heist movies where a bank vault was subjected to high-tech manipulations by athletic super-crooks... those same scenes apparently took the film's authors back to the very same sources, since "The Real McCoy" recycles the same devices, not quite as well as the originals."

Stephen Vagg of Filmink argued "Kilmer had one of the all-time great hot streaks in the early ‘90s – The Doors, Thunderheart, Tombstone, True Romance, Heat… The Real McCoy is the most anonymous of these."
