= Ballpark Synagogue =

Historic building in South Bend, Indiana, US

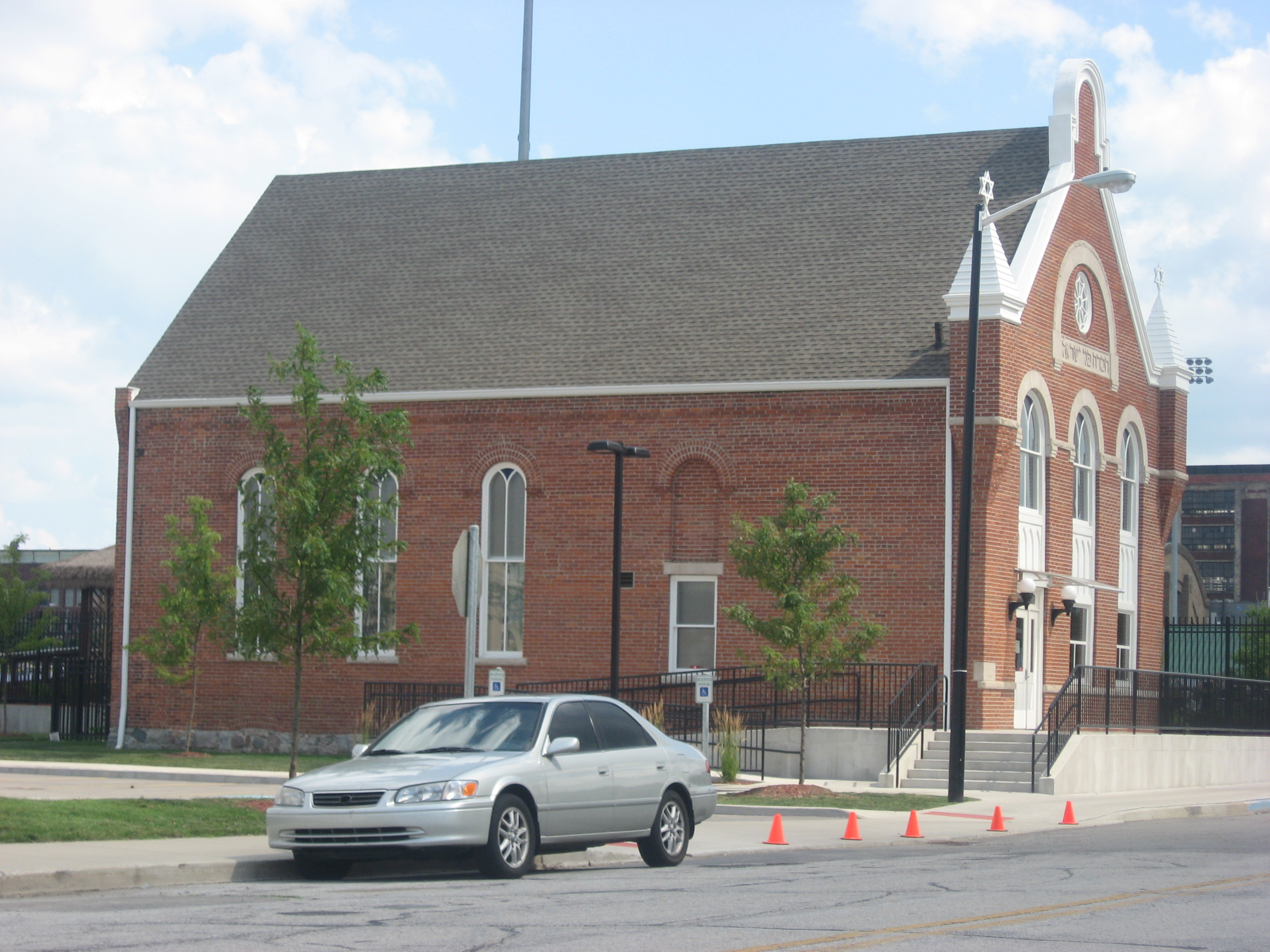
- The former synagogue in 2013

- Location in Indiana Ballpark Synagogue (the United States)

Religion
- Affiliation: Judaism: Orthodox (1887–1982); Reconstructionist (1982–1990)
- Ecclesiastical or organisational status: Synagogue (1887–1990); Retail outlet (since 2012)
- Ownership: South Bend Cubs
- Status: Closed (as a synagogue); Restored and repurposed

Location
- Location: 420 South William Street, South Bend, Indiana
- Country: United States
- Coordinates: 41°40′17″N 86°15′21″W

Architecture
- Architects: Freyermuth & Maurer
- Type: Synagogue architecture
- Style: Romanesque Revival
- Established: 1887 (as a congregation)
- Completed: 1901
- Sons of Israel Synagogue
- U.S. National Register of Historic Places
- NRHP reference No.: 13000427
- Added to NRHP: June 25, 2013

The Ballpark Synagogue, officially B'nai Israel Synagogue (transliterated from Hebrew as "Sons of Israel"), is a historic former Jewish synagogue, located in South Bend, Indiana, in the United States. The oldest synagogue in South Bend, it is also thought to be "America's only ballpark synagogue."

In 2012 the unused synagogue was renovated and reopened as a gift shop for the South Bend Cubs minor league baseball team, whose ballpark abuts the property. The synagogue was listed on the National Register of Historic Places in 2013.

== History ==
The modest synagogue was built in 1901 by Jewish immigrants from Eastern Europe. The congregation was Orthodox for most of its history; in 1982 it became a Reconstructionist temple and was renamed B'nai Yisrael. After some years of declining attendance in a neighborhood that continued to deteriorate despite renewal efforts, including construction of a minor league ballpark adjacent to the synagogue, the last services were held in the building in 1990. It was then donated to the Indiana Landmarks Foundation.

In 2005, the Foundation sold the synagogue to Chris Wood for use as a residence; however the city decided to use the building or the land it stood on as part of its urban renewal efforts and bought the building from Wood in 2007 for $130,000.

Plans to use the building as a museum, or to move it to a new location, fell through due to lack of funds, and the building stood neglected and deteriorating for several years.

=== Restoration and refurbishment ===
In 2012 Andrew T. Berlin, new owner of the South Bend Cubs baseball team, purchased the synagogue and funded a $1 million renovation. Berlin paid for restoration, including a refurbishment of the building's handsome brass chandelier, and for new wall paintings combining biblical and baseball themes. A mural of Noah's Ark is captioned "Rain Delay", and a copy of Michelangelo's Creation of Adam from the ceiling of the Sistine Chapel shows God's hand encased in a baseball glove as he hands a baseball to Adam. The caption reads: "Play Ball."

The preserved building stands on the grounds of Four Winds Field at Coveleski Stadium, where it serves as the Cubs' team gift shop.

A short film about the restoration of the synagogue won a 2013 Emmy Award.

==== Criticism ====
Robert Nevel, a Chicago-based architect who attended the synagogue as a boy, told The New York Times in 2015 that the reuse of the bimah (the central platform from which the Torah is read) as the location of the cash register felt like "accidental symbolism" and "sardonic commentary" on the antisemitic canard that Jews worship money. He also said that the design of the access ramp had "mucked up" the building's stone base, a distinguishing feature of early Chicago style architecture.

== Architecture ==
The 1 1/2-story structure was designed in Romanesque Revival style. Finished in orange-brick limestone, it has a gabled roof topped by a large stone arch trimmed in white. Its three tall front windows are arched at the top and square at the bottom; a white metal panel with a design of pressed arches separates the top and bottom of each window. The name of the synagogue is engraved above the center window at the base of another arch-shaped design, with an oculus window at the center. On either corner of the front facade is a square brick tourelle with a corbelled base; each tourelle is topped by a pyramid-shaped metal roof with a Star of David finial.

The interior design includes a main sanctuary with a balcony for female worshippers, several smaller rooms, and a basement that previously housed a mikveh.

== See also ==
- History of the Jews in the United States
- South Bend Cubs
