= Gundolf S. Freyermuth =

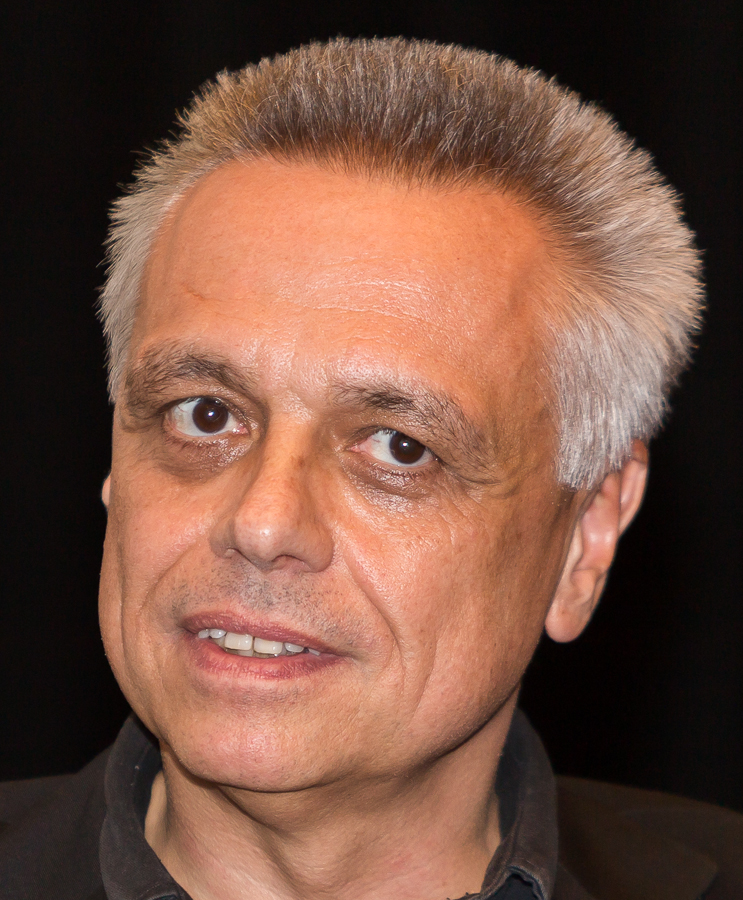
Freyermuth in 2014

Gundolf S. Freyermuth (born 1955) is a German-American professor for media studies and author. In 2010, he co-founded, together with Prof. Björn Bartholdy, the Cologne Game Lab at the Technical University of Cologne in Germany.

== Biography ==
From 2004 to 2025, Freyermuth taught at Internationale Filmschule Köln, first as a professor of applied media studies and, starting in 2014, as an associate professor of comparative media studies. From 2014 to 2025, he served as a professor of media and game Studies at Technical University of Cologne and, alongside Björn Bartholdy, as co-director of the Cologne Game Lab.

He retired from his academic positions in 2025 to focus on writing.

He has written and edited some 20 books of non-fiction and fiction, including three novels, and published more than 500 essays, features, and articles. He has also directed documentaries and written scripts for radio plays, documentaries, and feature films.

Freyermuth's research concentrates on the development of new artistic and communicative practices, new forms of linear and non-linear audiovisuality, network culture, and cross- and transmediality.

Freyermuth studied comparative literature and aesthetics at the Free University of Berlin and wrote his Ph.D. thesis on the aesthetic impact of the techno-cultural processes of digitalization, completed in 2004.

Before beginning his career in academics, Freyermuth held positions as editor, department head, reporter and head reporter for German magazines (such as stern and Tempo). Furthermore, he wrote numerous texts as a freelance writer on such topics as literature, film and digital media, while living on the West Coast.

Gundolf S. Freyermuth is a dual German-American citizen, and the brother of German-American entertainment lawyer and film producer Ortwin Freyermuth.

== Partial list of publications ==
- "Transcendent Travels: Wayfinding in Extended Realities." In: Navigating Imaginary Worlds: Wayfinding and Subcreation, edited by Mark J.P. Wolf, New York and London: Routledge 2025, Pg. 170-194.
- Gaming the Metaverse. Ed. by Benjamin Beil, Gundolf S. Freyermuth, Isabelle Hamm, and Vanessa Ossa, Bielefeld: transcript 2025.
- Playful Materialities. The Stuff That Games Are Made Of. Ed. by Benjamin Beil, Gundolf S. Freyermuth, Hanns Christian Schmidt, and Raven Rusch, Bielefeld: transcript 2022.
- Paratextualizing Games. Investigations on the Paraphernalia and Peripheries of Play. Ed. by Benjamin Beil, Gundolf S. Freyermuth and Hanns Christian Schmidt, Bielefeld: transcript 2021.
- Playing Utopia. Futures in Digital Games. Ed. by Benjamin Beil, Gundolf S. Freyermuth and Hanns Christian Schmidt, Bielefeld: transcript 2019.
- "Transmedia. Twelve Postulates." In: Clash of Realities 2015/16: On the Art, Technology, and Theory of Digital Games. Proceedings of the 6th and 7th Conference, Bielefeld: transcript 2017, p. 97-126.
- Games | Game Design | Game Studies. An Introduction, Bielefeld: transcript 2016.
- "From Analog to Digital Image Space: Toward a Historical Theory of Immersion." In: Immersion in the Visual Arts and Media, edited by Fabienne Liptay and Burcu Dogramaci, Leiden and Boston: Brill Rodopi 2015, Pg. 165-203.
- New Game Plus. Perspektiven der Game Studies: Genres – Künste – Diskurse. Ed. by Benjamin Beil, Gundolf S. Freyermuth and Lisa Gotto, Bielefeld: transcript 2015.
- "That's it." A Final Visit with Charles Bukowski, Xlibris Corp 2000.
