= Second St. Joseph Hotel =

- U.S. National Register of Historic Places
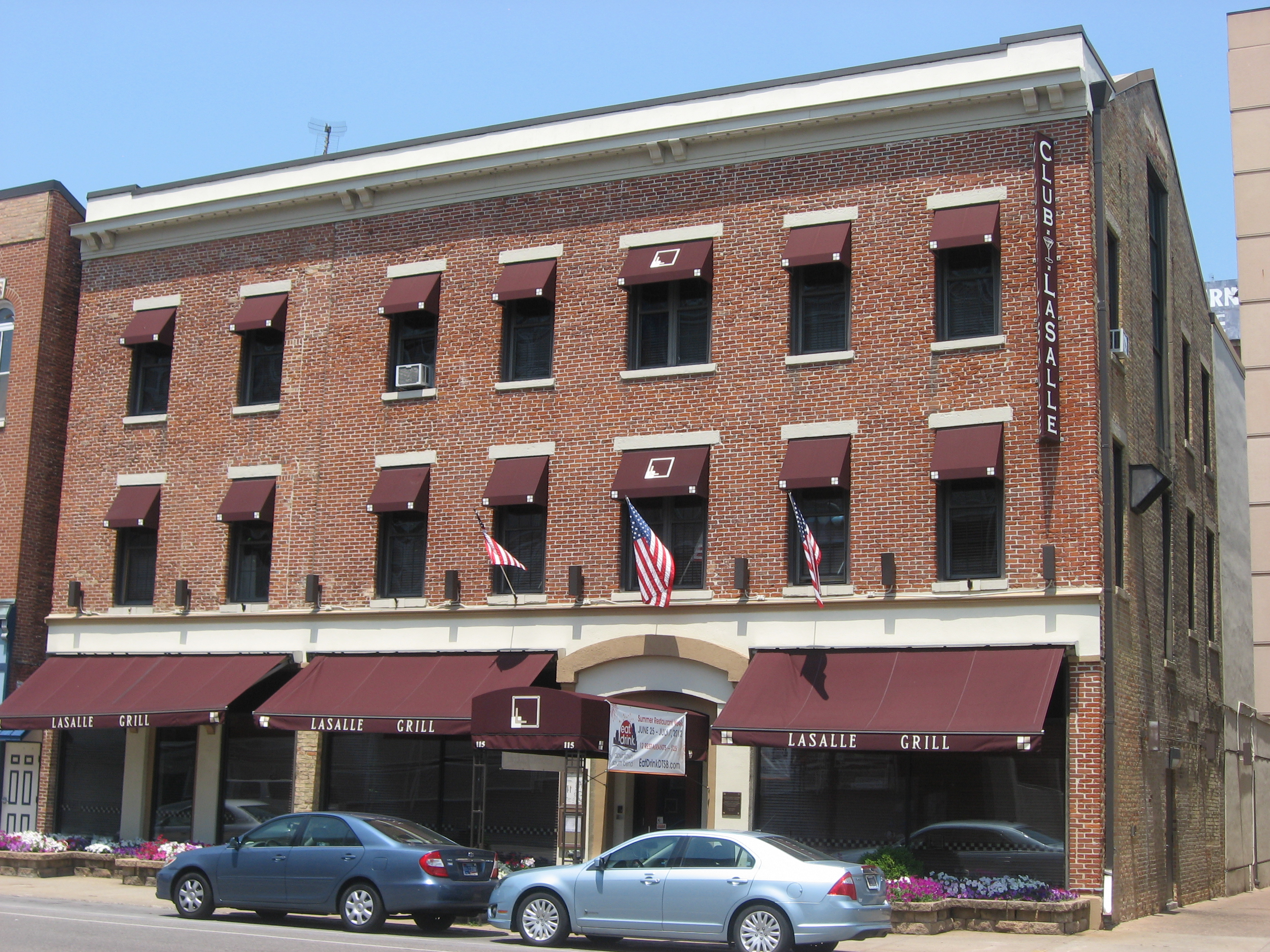
- Second St. Joseph Hotel, July 2012

- Location within Indiana Location within the United States
- Location: 117-119 W. Colfax, South Bend, Indiana
- Coordinates: 41°40′41″N 86°15′4″W
- Area: less than one acre
- Built: 1868
- Architectural style: Federal
- MPS: Downtown South Bend Historic MRA
- NRHP reference No.: 85001227
- Added to NRHP: June 5, 1985

Second St. Joseph Hotel is a historic hotel building located at South Bend, Indiana. It was built in 1868, and is a three-story, Federal style brick building. It is the oldest extant commercial building in the city of South Bend. It was used as a hotel until 1876, after which it housed a variety of commercial enterprises. It is located next to the John G. Kerr Company building.

It was listed on the National Register of Historic Places in 1985.
