= John G. Kerr Company =

- U.S. National Register of Historic Places
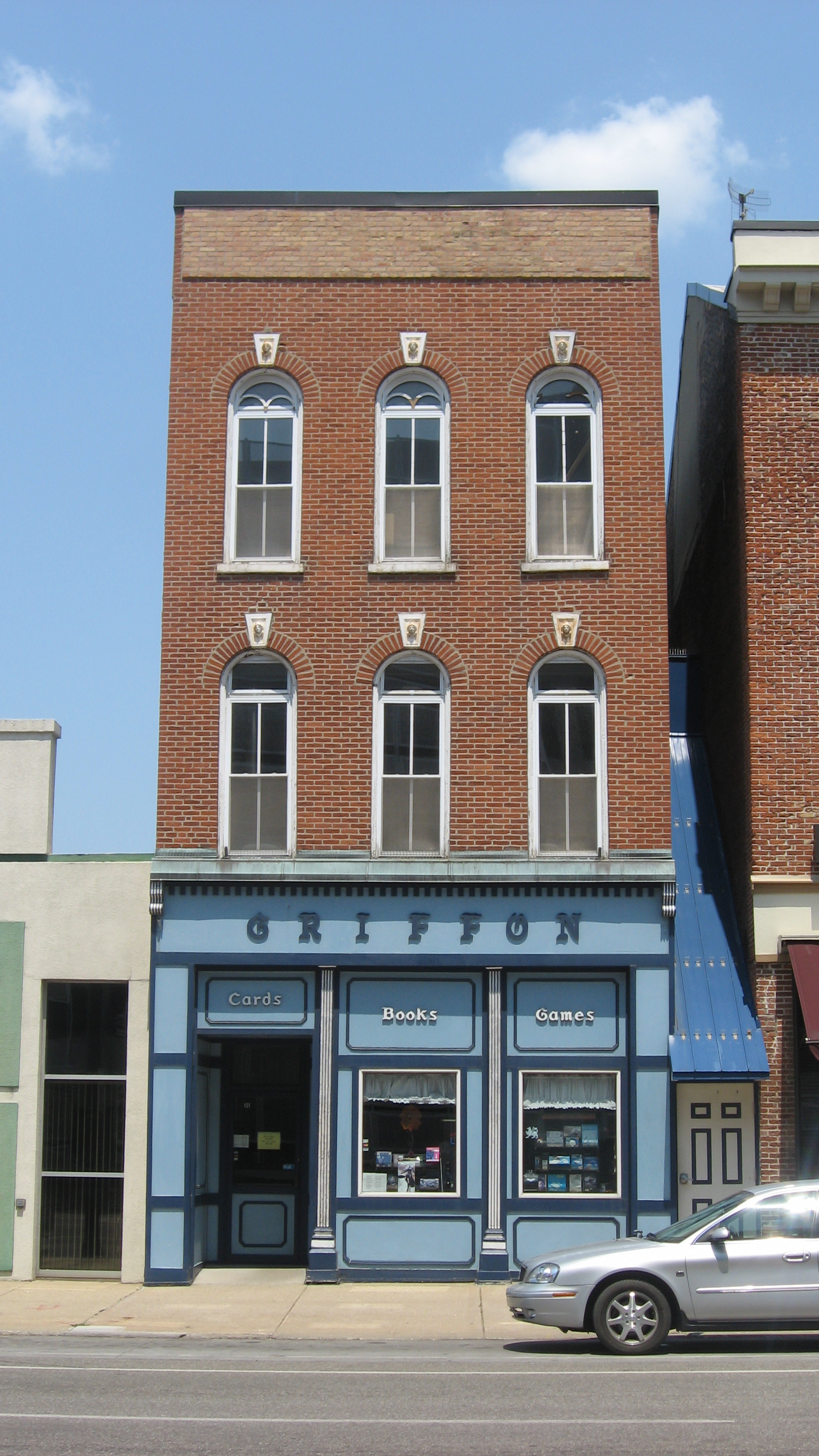
- John G. Kerr Company, July 2012

- Location within Indiana Location within the United States
- Location: 121 W. Colfax, South Bend, Indiana
- Coordinates: 41°40′41″N 86°15′5″W
- Area: less than one acre
- Built: 1891
- Architectural style: Italianate
- MPS: Downtown South Bend Historic MRA
- NRHP reference No.: 85001217
- Added to NRHP: June 5, 1985

John G. Kerr Company is a historic commercial building located at South Bend, Indiana. It was built in 1891, and is a three-story, Italianate style brick building. It has round arched windows and a cast iron storefront, and is located next to the Second St. Joseph Hotel.

Since 1976, it has been the home of Griffon Games and Bookstore. The building was listed on the National Register of Historic Places in 1985.
