= Fowler House =

Fowler House may refer to:

in the United States (by state then city)

- Oak Place (Huntsville, Alabama), listed on the National Register of Historic Places (NRHP) as the Steele-Fowler House, in Madison County
- Absalom Fowler House, Little Rock, Arkansas, NRHP-listed
- Fowler Family Farm, Cumming, Georgia, listed on the NRHP in Forsyth County
- Fowler Apartments, Milledgeville, Georgia, listed on the NRHP in Baldwin County
- Solomon Fowler Mansion, Bristol, Indiana, listed on the NRHP in Elkhart County
- Moses Fowler House, Lafayette, Indiana, listed on the NRHP in Tippecanoe County
- Fowler Swimming Pool and Bathhouse, Fowler, Kansas, listed on the NRHP in Meade County
- Clark C. Fowler House, Tompkinsville, Kentucky, listed on the NRHP in Monroe County
- Benjamin Piatt Fowler House, Union, Kentucky, listed on the NRHP in Boone County
- Jeremiah Fowler House, Lubec, Maine, listed on the NRHP in Washington County
- Fowler House (Danvers, Massachusetts), listed on the NRHP in Essex County
- Rea Putnam Fowler House, Danvers, Massachusetts, listed on the NRHP in Essex County
- Henry T. Fowler House, Kansas City, Missouri, listed on the NRHP in Jackson County
- Charles N. Fowler House, Elizabeth, New Jersey, listed on the NRHP in Union County
- Fowler-Loomis House, Mexico, New York, listed on the NRHP in Oswego County
- William Dixon Fowler House, Pauline, South Carolina, listed on the NRHP in Spartanburg County
- C.E. and Bertha Fowler House, Watertown, South Dakota, listed on the NRHP in Codington County
- William J. Fowler Mill and House, Eve Mills, Tennessee, listed on the NRHP in Monroe County
- Edwards-Fowler House, Lake City, Tennessee, listed on the NRHP in Anderson County
- Fowler House (Bastrop, Texas), listed on the NRHP in Bastrop County
- Fowler-Jenkins House, Bastrop, Texas, listed on the NRHP in Bastrop County
- D. D. Fowler House, Georgetown, Texas, listed on the NRHP in Williamson County
- Botts-Fowler House, Mansfield, Texas, listed on the NRHP in Tarrant County
- Fowler House (Salado, Texas), listed on the NRHP in Bell County
- Fowler-Steele House, Windsor, Vermont, listed on the NRHP in Windsor County
- Capt. Enoch S. Fowler House, Port Townsend, Washington, listed on the NRHP in Jefferson County
