= Forsyth County Courthouse =

Forsyth County Courthouse may refer to:

- Forsyth County Courthouse (Georgia), in Cumming, Georgia, behind the Cumming Bandstand
- Forsyth County Courthouse (North Carolina), in Winston-Salem, North Carolina

== See also ==
- Forsyth County (disambiguation)
