= Yarlagadda (name) =

Yarlagadda (Telugu: యార్లగడ్డ) is a Telugu surname. Notable people with the name include:

- Yarlagadda Nayudamma (born 1947), Indian surgeon
- Yarlagadda Lakshmi Prasad (born 1953), Indian writer
- Pratima Yarlagadda (born 1981), actress
- Shobu Yarlagadda (born 1971), Indian film producer
- Sri Vyshnavi Yarlagadda (born 1995), Indian athlete
- Yarlagadda Venkata Rao (born 1975), Indian Politician
- Chaithra Yarlagadda (born 2009), British-American-Indian Activist
