= Mekayla Diehl =

American beauty pageant titleholder

Mekayla (Diehl) Eppers
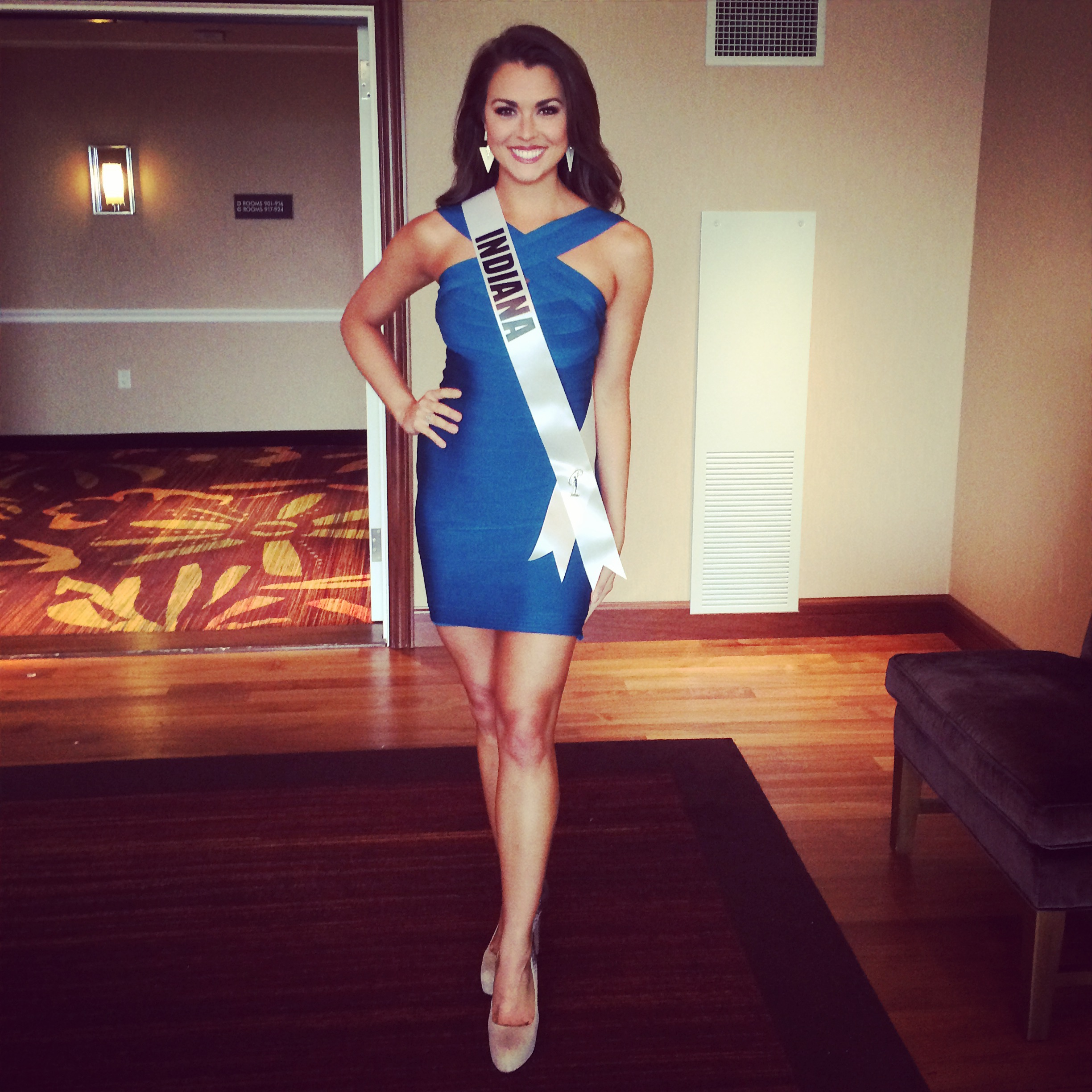
- Mekayla before her Miss USA interview, 2014
- Born: Mekayla Fawn Diehl; November 28, 1988 (age 37); Elkhart, Indiana, U.S.
- Height: 5 ft 8 in (1.73 m)
- Beauty pageant titleholder
- Title: Miss Indiana USA 2014; Mrs. Indiana America 2017; Mrs. America 2017
- Major competitions: Miss Indiana 2012; (2nd Runner-Up); Miss Indiana USA 2014; (Winner); Miss USA 2014; (Top 20); Mrs. America 2017; (Winner); Mrs. World 2018; (Top 12)

Mekayla Fawn Diehl Eppers (née Diehl; born November 28, 1988) is an American beauty pageant titleholder. She was crowned Miss Indiana USA 2014 and later competed in Miss USA 2014, where she placed in the top twenty. In 2018, Diehl was crowned Mrs. America 2018 and went on to place in the top twelve in South Africa at the Mrs. World competition. Diehl is the first woman of Native American descent to represent Indiana at the Miss USA pageant.

== Early life ==
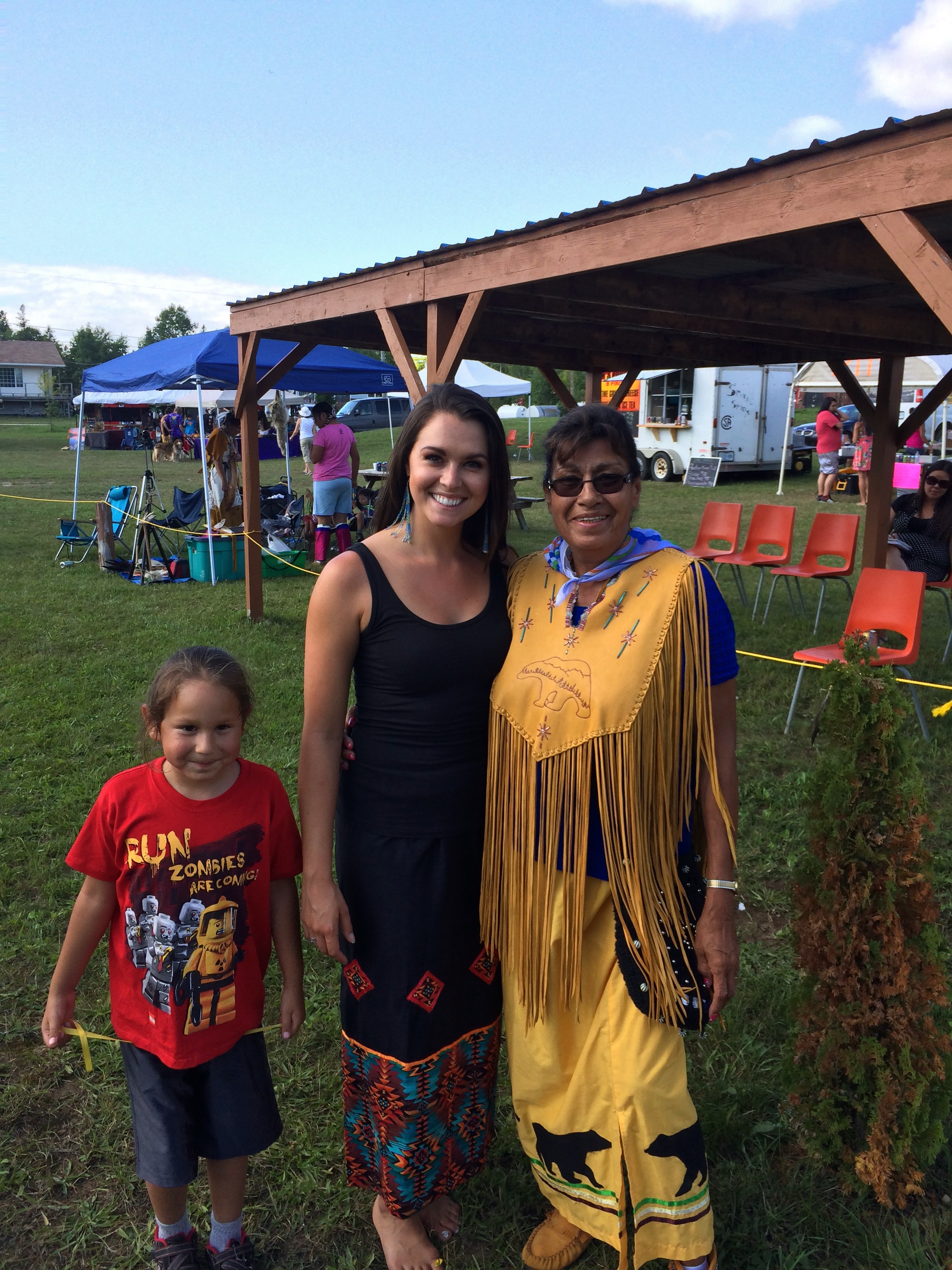
Mekayla with Chief Irene at the 2014 Zhiibaahaasing Pow Wow

Diehl was born in Elkhart, Indiana in 1988. She is descended from the Ojibwe tribe, a member of the Ontario-based Zhiibaahaasing First Nation through her mother. She was adopted and raised by her grandmother after being sexually abused by a family friend. She went on to graduate from White Pigeon High School in 2007 after having successful sports careers in basketball, volleyball, and track.

== Career ==
Diehl graduated in 2011 from Albion College with a bachelor's degree of liberal arts in mass communication where she played on the volleyball team and track team. In June 2012 she competed in the Miss Indiana 2012 pageant where she placed second runner-up and won the "Joy of Life" award. In October of that year she competed in the Miss Indiana USA 2013 pageant where she was a semi-finalist.

In 2012, Mekayla accepted a position at Froggy 102.7 WLEG in Goshen, Indiana as the production director and afternoon DJ until the station's format changed in 2013.

In October 2013, Diehl won the Miss Indiana USA 2014 title which qualified her to compete in the Miss USA 2014 pageant the following year, where she placed in the top twenty. She is the first contestant of Native American descent to represent Indiana at the Miss USA pageant.

Diehl, who is 5 feet 8 inches (1.73 m) tall, has been praised for being a "normal", healthy size 4 and for not being skinny, a common stereotype of beauty pageant contestants. Nia Sanchez, the winner of the 2014 pageant, stated that Diehl is no different than the other athletic pageant contestants she competed against. "I felt like this year we had a really healthy class of girls, and that’s what the pageant is about, not being skinny and having the clothes fall off your bones, but being fit, healthy and active. And Mekayla is," she said. "We were at the gym working out together. She was telling me how she does different sports. We all do." Diehl has ignited a wave of positivity encouraging women to be healthy and not go to extremes of having unhealthy habits to be skinny.

Though Diehl is celebrated for being a healthy role model encouraging young women to be active and healthy, a few critics created backlash by stating that even though she represents something new she isn't normal. Their main argument was that the average American woman, according to the Centers for Disease Control and Prevention, is 5-foot-3 and 166 pounds with a size 12 or 14 waist size and has a BMI of 33.

She received coverage from all the major networks, interviewed by Elisabeth Hasselbeck on Fox and Friends, The Today Show, Good Morning America, Entertainment Tonight. and WNDU

She went on to gain her real estate license with Century 21 Affiliated serving the Northern Indiana region. Mekayla competed and won the title of Mrs. Indiana America in April 2017 and went on to win Mrs. America 2018 in August at the Westgate in Las Vegas.

In December 2018, Mekayla launched her new pageant coaching business titled Reign Pageantry.

== Personal life ==
In November 2015, she married Christopher Eppers of Elkhart, Indiana with Grand Design RV.

Awards and achievements
Preceded by Emily Hart	Miss Indiana USA; 2014	Succeeded by Gretchen Reece
