= Miss Indiana USA =

Beauty contest in the United States

- Formation: 1952
- Type: Beauty pageant
- Headquarters: Carmel
- Location: Indiana
- Members: Miss USA
- Official language: English
- Website: Official website

The Miss Indiana USA competition is the pageant that selects the representative for the state of Indiana in the Miss USA pageant and the name of the title held by those representatives. This pageant is currently produced by Empower2 Productions, headquartered in Indianapolis, Indiana.

The pageant is currently held in Noblesville and has previously been hosted by Anderson, Michigan City, Indianapolis, Carmel and Fort Wayne.

Nine Miss Indiana USA winners have previously held the Miss Indiana Teen USA title and competed at Miss Teen USA, and three previously competed in other states (Florida, Georgia and Virginia). Three Miss Indiana-USA winners (1987, 2002, and 2023) have also previously competed at Miss America.

The most recent placement was Alexis Lete in 2020, who finished 3rd runner-up.

The current Miss Indiana USA is Eniolá Oke from Brownsburg, who was chosen as Miss Indiana-USA 2026 on June 28, 2026, at Noblesville High School in Noblesville. She will represent Indiana at the Miss USA 2026 pageant.

== Gallery of titleholders ==
Eniola Oke, Miss Indiana USA 2026

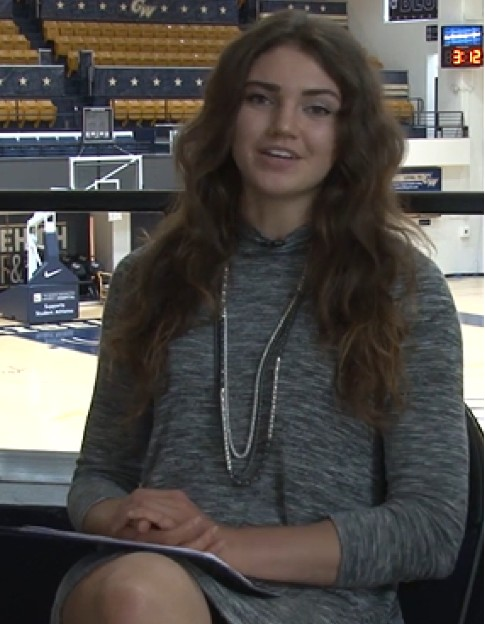
Alexis Lete, Miss Indiana USA 2020

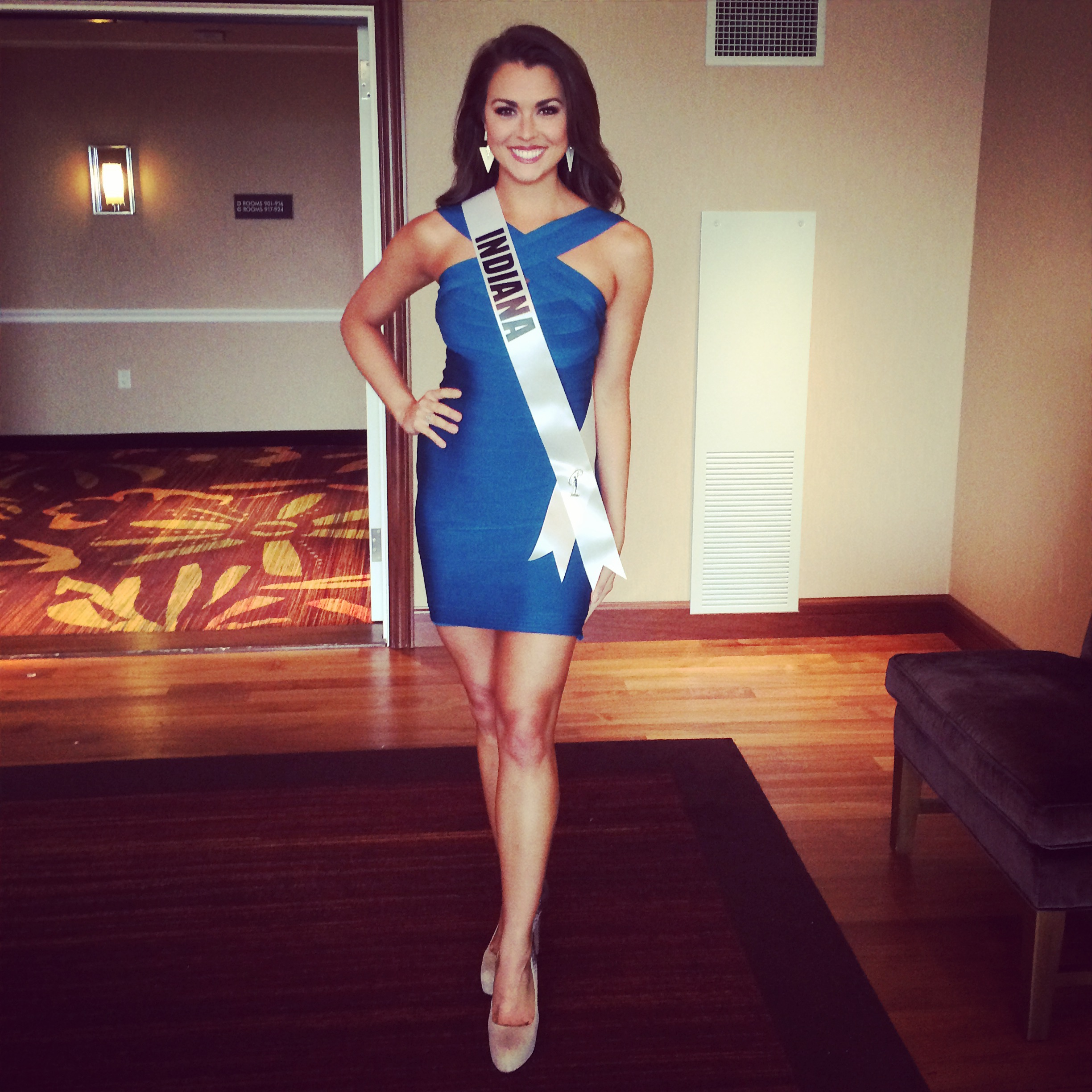
Mekayla Diehl, Miss Indiana USA 2014

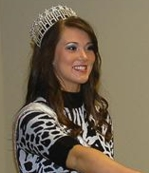
Allison Biehle, Miss Indiana USA 2010

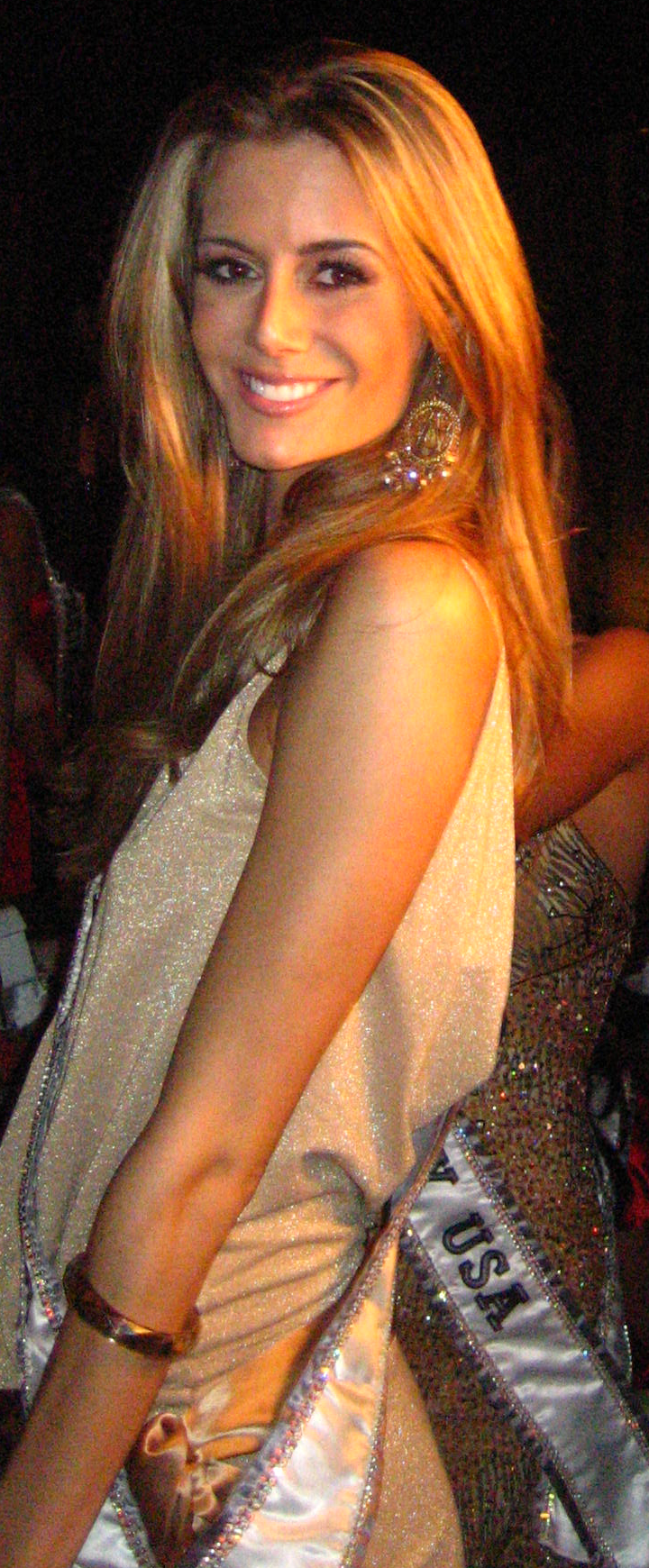
Brittany Mason, Miss Indiana USA 2008

== Results summary ==
=== Placements ===
- 1st runners-up: Holli Dennis (1981)
- 2nd runners-up: Elaine Richards (1966), Kelleah "Kelly" Lloyd (2002)
- 3rd runners-up: Jayme Buecher (1978), Alexis Lete (2020)
- Top 10/12: Virginia Johnson (1952), Jo Berryman (1975), Holly Roehl (1996), Pratima Yarlagadda (1999), Tashina Kastigar (2003), Brittany Mason (2008)
- Top 16/19/20: Cecilia Dennis (1954), Sue Ekamp (1962), Jillian Wunderlich (2011), Mekayla Diehl (2014), Eniolá Oke (2026)

Indiana holds a record of 16 placements at Miss USA.

=== Special awards ===
- Best State Costume: Heather Gray (1992)
- Miss Photogenic: Gretchen Reece (2015)
- Miss Congeniality: Tate Fritchley (2019)

== Winners ==
Color key

- Declared as Winner
- Ended as runner-up
- Ended as one of the finalists or semifinalists

Year	Name	Hometown	Age (Note: Age at the time of the Miss USA pageant)	Local Title	Placement at Miss USA	Special awards at Miss USA	Notes
2026	Eniolá Oke	Brownsburg	22	Miss Monroe County	Top 20		
2025	Sydney Shrewsbury	Indianapolis	24	Miss Indianapolis			
2024	Stephanie Sullivan	Elkhart	33	Miss Elkhart County			
2023	Haley Jordan Begay	Pittsboro	25	Miss Central Indiana			Previously Miss Indiana 2017
2022	Samantha Paige Toney	Greenwood	27	Miss Clarksville			Competed at the state pageant in the Miss USA system on her 7th consecutive attempt, including a semifinal placement in Miss Kentucky USA; Former member of Indianapolis Colts Cheerleaders
2021	A'Niyah Monae Birdsong	Anderson	26	Miss Anderson			Shortest reigning Miss Indiana USA (8 months and 15 days)
2020	Alexis Nicole Lete	New Albany	23		3rd runner-up		Longest reigning Miss Indiana USA (1 year, 8 months, and 7 days)
2019	Tate Elizabeth Fritchley	Evansville	20			Miss Congeniality	Previously Miss Indiana State Fair 2016
2018	Darrian Rachel Arch	Chesterton	23				Previously Miss Indiana Teen USA 2013
2017	Brittany Winchester	Indianapolis	26				
2016	Meryssa Morgan Abel	North Vernon	26				Previously Miss Indiana Teen USA 2008
2015	Gretchen S. Reece	North Vernon	23			Miss Photogenic	
2014	Mekayla Fawn Diehl	Bristol	25		Top 20		2nd runner-up at Miss Indiana 2012 competition; Later Mrs. Indiana 2017 and Mrs. America 2018 under her married name, Mekayla Eppers
2013	Emily Hart	Fort Wayne	25				
2012	Megan Leigh Myrehn	Carmel	20				Previously Miss Virginia Teen USA 2008; Top 15 at Miss Teen USA 2008
2011	Jillian Leigh Wunderlich	Kokomo	19		Top 16		Previously Miss Florida Teen USA 2008; Top 15 at Miss Teen USA 2008
2010	Allison Biehle	North Vernon	21				
2009	Courtni Shabana Hall	Crawfordsville	20				Previously Miss Indiana Teen USA 2004
2008	Brittany Mason	Anderson	21		Top 10		Former Director of Miss Universe Ireland pageant
2007	Jami Ann Stallings	Newburgh	20				Previously Miss Indiana Teen USA 2003; Top 15 at Miss Teen USA 2003
2006	Bridget Bobel	Peru	26				Top 10 at National Sweetheart 2004; Sister of Miss Indiana 2000 Betsy Bobel
2005	Kaitlyn Christopher	Kokomo	18				
2004	Stephanie Jean Keusch	Jasper	24				
2003	Tashina Brooke Kastigar	West Terre Haute	22		Semi-finalist		Previously Miss Indiana Teen USA 1998
2002	Kelleah Ann "Kelly" Lloyd	Indianapolis	25		2nd runner-up		"Triple Crown" winner: Previously Miss Indiana Teen USA 1993; 1st runner up Miss Teen USA 1993; Previously Miss Indiana 1999; 2nd runner-up to National Sweetheart 1998; Former director of operations for the Miss Indiana USA and Miss Indiana Teen USA pageants
2001	Sarah Jane McClary	Evansville	22				Previously Miss Indiana Teen USA 1995
2000	Kristal Michelle Wile	Anderson	23				
1999	Pratima Yarlagadda	Shipshewana	22		Semi-finalist		
1998	Nicole Llewellyn	Munster	23				Previously Miss Indiana Teen USA 1992; Semifinalist in Miss Teen USA 1992; Later Mrs. Indiana 2001, Mrs. America 2001 & Mrs. World 2002 under her married name, Nicole Brink.
1997	Tricia Carolyn Nosko	Evansville	25				
1996	Holly Noelle Roehl		23		Semi-finalist		Previously Miss Georgia Teen USA 1990; 2nd runner-up at Miss Teen USA 1990
1995	Heather Michelle Hart	Newburgh					Previously Miss Indiana Teen USA 1991; Top 12 at Miss Teen USA 1991
1994	Kim Scull	Clarksville					
1993	Lisa Renee Higgins	South Bend					
1992	Heather Christine Gray					Best State Costume	
1991	Cathi Bennett	New Albany	24				
1990	Meri Lyn Buker	Kokomo	24				
1989	Gwen Rachelle Volpe	Griffith	22				
1988	Loetta Lynn Earnest	East Chicago	22				
1987	Alecia Rae Masalkoski	Bremen					Previously Miss Michigan 1985
1986	Diane Andrysiak	South Bend					
1985	Theresa Hobbs	Bloomington	23				
1984	Susan Willardo	Highland	21				
1983	Antoniette "Toni" Marie Yudt	Portage					
1982	Sara Anne Binkley	Greencastle					
1981	Holli Rene Dennis	Fort Wayne			1st runner-up		
1980	Susan "Susie" Osby	Hebron					Former State director from 1990 to 1998
1979	Deborah Ann Hayes	Kokomo					
1978	Jayme Buecher	New Albany			3rd runner-up	Best State Costume – 3rd Place	
1977	Lynn Flaherty	Nappanee					
1976	Annette Anderson	Gary					
1975	Jo Ellen Berryman	Kokomo	24		Semi-finalist		Non-finalist at Miss World USA 1974
1974	Lisa Gay Childress	Spencer	20				
1973	Debbie Ausenbaugh	Merrillville					
1972	Julie Jo Clifford	Edwardsport					Later Miss Indiana World 1975; 1st Runner-Up in Miss World USA 1975
1971	Debra Dee Downhour	Cassville	21				
1970	Mary Ann McBride	Michigan City					
1969	Linda Smith						
1968	Nikki Peck	Hammond					
1967	Pamela Jo Talmadge	Hammond	19				During her reign, Talmadge, who was adopted, was reunited with her older siblings (two brothers and a sister) after nearly 19 years being apart.
1966	Elaine L. Richards	Merrillville			2nd runner-up		Died age 41 on June 26, 1984, in Florida after a long illness
1965	Lora Starr						
1964	Charlene Kratochvil	Kokomo	19				
1963	Vickie Little						
1962	Sue Ekamp	Mishawaka			Semi-finalist		
1961	Janice Kay Oliver	Indianapolis	18				
1960	June Cochran	Indianapolis	18				Later Miss Indiana World 1962; Contestant at Miss USA World 1962; Later Playboy Playmate of the Year 1963
1959	Anita Watkins						
1958	Shirley Ann Ball						
1957	Patricia "Pat" Dorsett	Indianapolis					
1956	Beverly Mattox						
1955	Mary Ann Wasick						
1954	Cecilia Ann Dennis	Milan			Semi-finalist		
1953	Edith Mae Krumme	Seymour					
1952	Virginia Ann Johnson				Semi-finalist		
