= Rebecca Paul =

Rebecca Paul may refer to:

- Rebecca Paul (lottery official) (born 1949), American lottery official
- Rebecca Paul (politician) (born 1979), British politician
