= Kelly Lloyd =

American lawyer

- Born: Kelly Lloyd; 1977 (age 48–49); Indianapolis, Indiana, U.S.
- Beauty pageant titleholder
- Title: Miss Indiana Teen USA 1993; Miss Indiana 1999; Miss Indiana USA 2002
- Hair color: Black
- Eye color: Brown
- Major competitions: Miss Indiana Teen USA 1993 (Winner); Miss Teen USA 1993 (1st Runner-Up); Miss Indiana 2000 (Winner); Miss America 2000; Miss Indiana USA 2002 (Winner); Miss USA 2002 (2nd Runner-Up)

Kelly Lloyd (born 1977 in Indianapolis) is an American model, consultant, attorney, and former beauty queen who has competed in the Miss Teen USA, Miss USA and Miss America pageants. She is one of only six women who have competed in these three pageants, and is known as a Triple Crown winner.

Lloyd's first pageant title was Miss Indiana Teen USA 1993. She represented her state in the Miss Teen USA 1993 pageant broadcast live from Biloxi, Mississippi on August 10, 1993, and placed first runner-up. The pageant was won by Charlotte Lopez of Vermont. Lloyd also won the Most Beautiful Eyes award.

Lloyd started competing in the Miss America system in 1996 when she won the Miss Central Indiana title. Her first attempt to win the Miss Indiana pageant resulted in a second runner-up placement. In 1997, she was first runner-up to Miss Indiana USA 1998 (won by Nicole Llewellyn). In 1998, Lloyd was named Miss Ball State, once again placed second runner-up to Miss Indiana, and represented her state in the National Sweetheart pageant where she also placed second runner-up. In 1999, she won the Miss North Central Indiana local pageant title and competed for the Miss Indiana title, which she won on June 12, 1999. Lloyd won the Albert J. Marks non-finalist interview award at the 2000 Miss America pageant. Lloyd suffered from asthma as a child, and her platform was aimed at improving the lives of those who had the disease.

On November 18, 2001, almost nine years after giving up her Miss Indiana Teen USA title, Lloyd won the 2002 Miss Indiana USA pageant. She went on to compete at Miss USA 2002, held in her home state in Gary, Indiana, where she placed second runner-up to Shauntay Hinton of the District of Columbia.

After giving up her crown, Lloyd started her own consulting business called "Triple Crown Consulting." After earning her Juris Doctor from the Indiana University School of Law in Bloomington, Lloyd was admitted to the Indiana Bar in 2006. She currently works as a model and spokesperson throughout the Midwest and can be seen in commercials for Gatorade, Safe Auto, Centennial Wireless, and H.H. Gregg, among others. Lloyd formerly worked as Director of Indiana Operations for Sanders & Associates, Inc., which produced the Miss Indiana USA and Miss Indiana Teen USA pageants. Now married, she resides in Greenwood, Indiana, and works as a corporate attorney for Indiana University Health.
