= St. John of the Cross Episcopal Church =

Historic site in Elkhart County, Indiana, US

- St. John of the Cross Episcopal Church, Rectory and Cemetery
- U.S. National Register of Historic Places
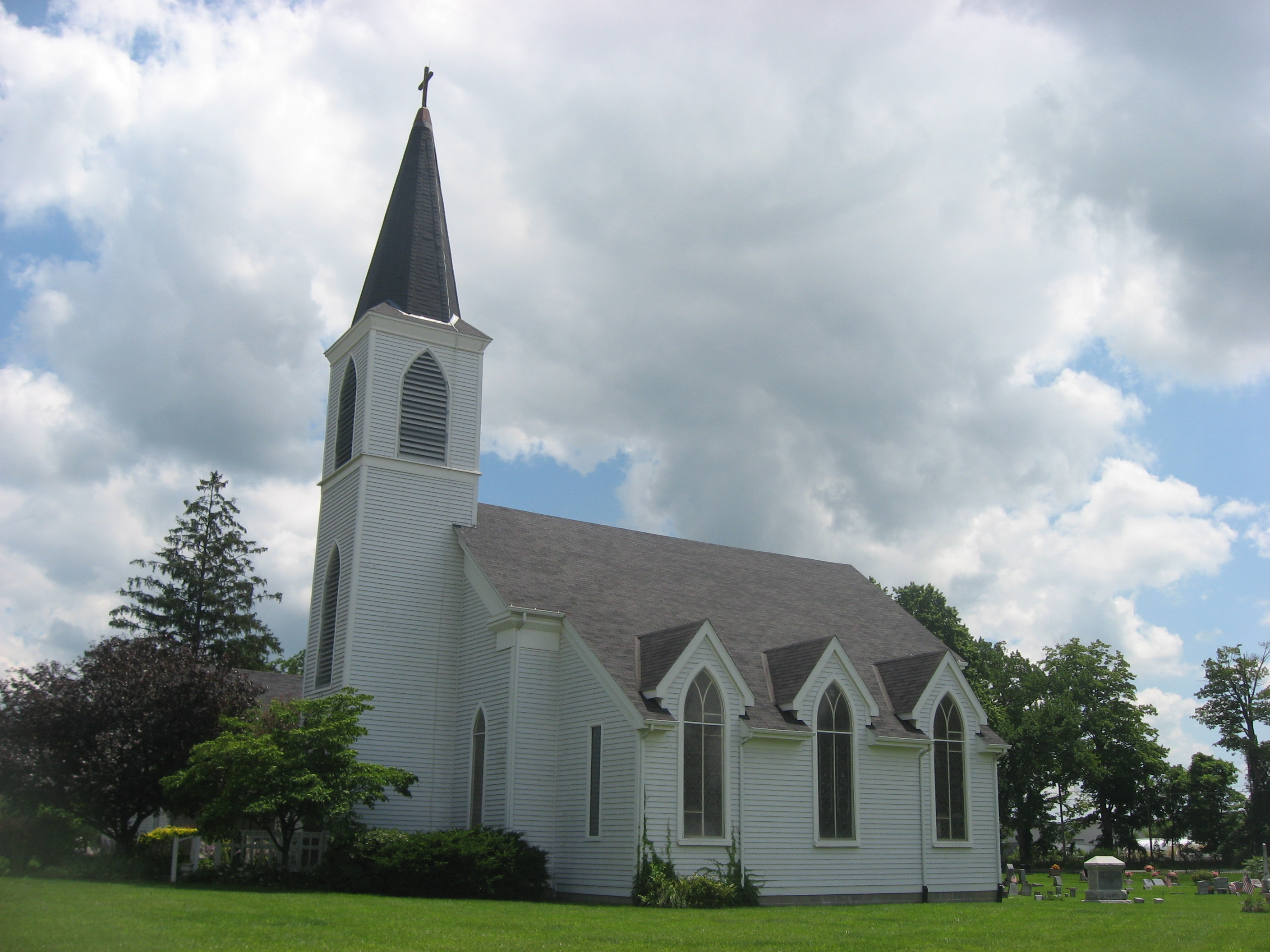
- St. John of the Cross Episcopal Church, July 2013

- Location within Indiana Location within the United States
- Location: 601 & 611 E. Vistula Rd., Bristol, Indiana
- Coordinates: 41°43′17″N 85°48′40″W
- Area: 2 acres (0.81 ha)
- Built: 1830, 1843-1847
- Architectural style: Greek Revival, Gothic Revival
- NRHP reference No.: 80000037
- Added to NRHP: September 17, 1980

St. John of the Cross Episcopal Church, Rectory and Cemetery is a historic Episcopal church complex located at Bristol, Indiana. The church was built between 1843 and 1847, and is a one-story, Gothic Revival style frame building. It has a projecting bell tower with octagonal roof and lancet windows. The associated rectory was built in 1830, and is a 1 1/2-story, rectangular, Greek Revival style frame dwelling. The complex also includes the contributing church cemetery.

The church reported 121 members in 2017 and 105 members in 2023; no membership statistics were reported in 2024 parochial reports. Plate and pledge income reported for the congregation in 2024 was $115,334. Average Sunday attendance (ASA) in 2024 was 33 persons.

The building was added to the National Register of Historic Places in 1980.
