= Alexis Lete =

American professional wrestler (born 1996)

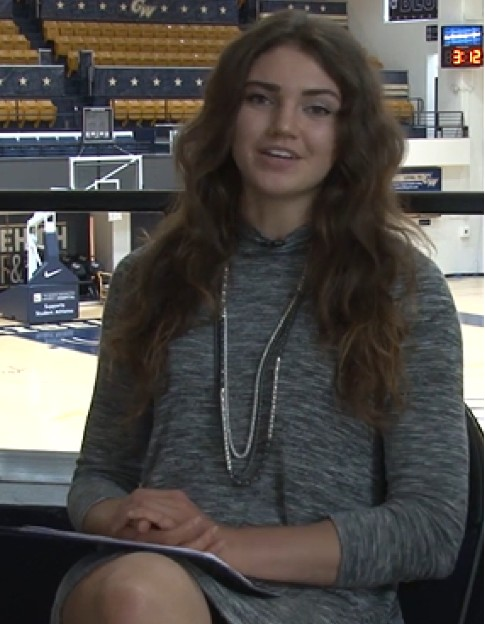
- Alexis Lete in 2016
- Born: Alexis Nicole Lete; October 30, 1996 (age 29); Louisville, Kentucky, U.S.
- Education: George Washington University
- Occupations: Media personality; professional wrestler
- Height: 185 cm (6 ft 1 in)

Alexis Nicole Lete (/ˈlɛti/; born October 30, 1996) is an American media personality and former professional wrestler and beauty pageant titleholder. Lete is best known for finishing as the runner-up on season 2 of Deal or No Deal Island in 2024. She additionally won Miss Indiana USA 2020 and competed at Miss USA 2020, appeared on WWE NXT between 2022 and 2023, and is a former collegiate volleyball player for the George Washington Colonials.

== Early life and education ==
Lete was born in Louisville, Kentucky on October 30, 1996, to Vicki and Zary Lete. She has one brother, Luke. She graduated from New Albany High School as a valedictorian, and graduated from George Washington University with a degree in broadcast journalism and communications.

Before taking an interest in volleyball, Lete played soccer, but she later decided to take up club volleyball in seventh grade, which led to her joining the Kentucky Indiana Volleyball Association (KIVA). She then played in the NCAA Division I program during her time at George Washington University.

== Career ==
=== Modelling and pageantry ===
In October 2018, Lete walked the runway during the D.C. Fashion Week at the finale show at the Embassy of France in Washington, D.C. Two years later, in October 2020, she was crowned Miss Indiana USA, and was the third overall runner-up for the Miss USA, making the top five nationally.

=== Professional wrestling career ===
In March 2022, Lete was one of the 45 college athletes to have attended a three-day WWE tryout during WrestleMania 38 weekend. In August 2022, it was announced that Lete had reported to the WWE Performance Center. She was assigned to its NXT brand in Orlando, Florida. Performing under the ring name Stella Lilly, she was presented as a social media influencer. Lete did not make an in-ring debut during the course of her year-long tenure, and departed from her WWE contract in October 2023.

== Personal life ==
Lete holds the Guinness World Record for the furthest volleyball set into a basketball hoop. She takes an interest in cryptocurrency, having previously hosted her own now-defunct podcast titled "Crypto Cast".

== Filmography ==
=== Television ===
Year	Title	Role	Notes	Ref(s)
2025	Deal or No Deal Island	Contestant	Season 2	
2026	The Challenge: Cutthroat	Contestant		

Awards and achievements
Preceded by Tate Fritchley	Miss Indiana USA; 2020	Succeeded by A'Niyah Birdsong
Preceded by (Nevada) Brittany McGowan^{1}	Miss USA 3rd runner-up 2020	Succeeded by (Illinois) Sydni Bennett
Notes and references
1. Last awarded in 2015, the third runner-up was replaced by Top 5 finalist from 2016 to 2019.
