= National Register of Historic Places listings in Monroe County, Kentucky =

Location of Monroe County in Kentucky

This is a list of the National Register of Historic Places listings in Monroe County, Kentucky.

It is intended to be a complete list of the properties on the National Register of Historic Places in Monroe County, Kentucky, United States. The locations of National Register properties for which the latitude and longitude coordinates are included below, may be seen in a map.

There are 6 properties listed on the National Register in the county.

This National Park Service list is complete through NPS recent listings posted December 12, 2025.

== Current listings ==
	Name on the Register	Image	Date listed	Location	City or town	Description
1	Barlow Baxter House		August 2, 2001 (#01000795)	Kentucky Route 163; 36°39′13″N 85°37′42″W	Hestand	
2	Thomas P. Evans House	Thomas P. Evans House	October 29, 1992 (#92001488)	701 N. Main St. 36°42′09″N 85°41′29″W	Tompkinsville	Located at the junction of KY-63 and KY-163 near the center of town
3	Clark C. Fowler House		August 2, 2001 (#01000794)	Kentucky Route 214; 36°38′38″N 85°29′09″W	Tompkinsville	
4	Mount Vernon AME Church	Mount Vernon AME Church	November 17, 1977 (#77000639)	North of Gamaliel on Kentucky Route 100; 36°40′28″N 85°47′57″W	Gamaliel	Built by emancipated slaves in the late 1840s
5	Old Mulkey Meetinghouse	Old Mulkey Meetinghouse	May 7, 1973 (#73000821)	South of Tompkinsville on Kentucky Route 1446; 36°40′40″N 85°42′27″W	Tompkinsville	Now part of a state park
6	George W. Proffitt, Jr. House	George W. Proffitt, Jr. House	August 2, 2001 (#01000793)	1945 County House Rd. 36°41′35″N 85°44′36″W	Tompkinsville	

== See also ==
- List of National Historic Landmarks in Kentucky
- National Register of Historic Places listings in Kentucky
