= Bristol-Washington Township School =

- U.S. National Register of Historic Places
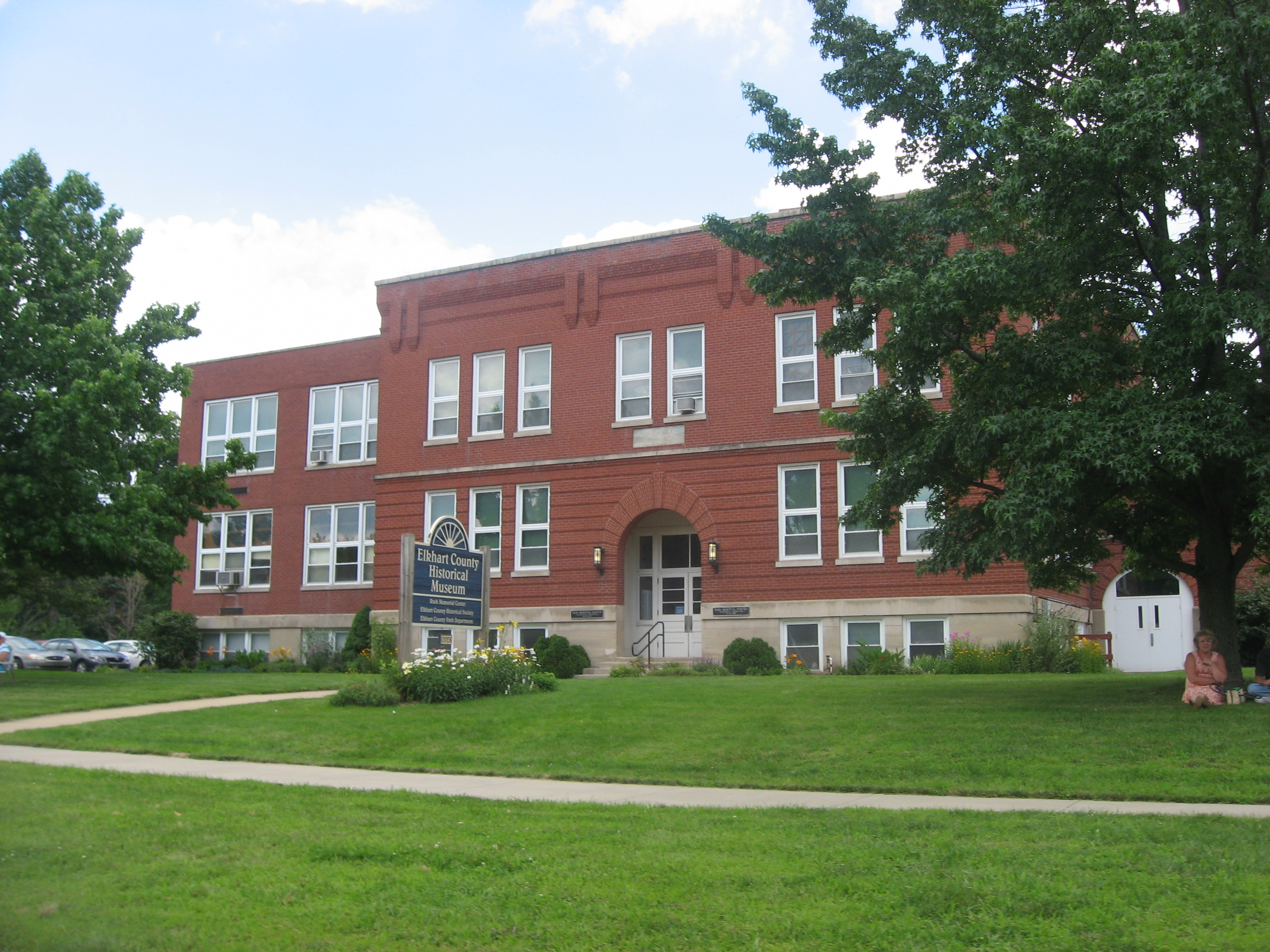
- Bristol-Washington Township School, July 2013

- Location within Indiana Location within the United States
- Location: 304 W. Vistula St., Bristol, Indiana
- Coordinates: 41°43′18″N 85°49′57″W
- Area: 1.3 acres (0.53 ha)
- Built: 1903-1904, 1923, 1925, 1949
- Architect: Selby, George; Ellwood, A.H.
- Architectural style: Colonial Revival
- NRHP reference No.: 91001164
- Added to NRHP: August 29, 1991

Bristol-Washington Township School, also known as Bristol High School, is a historic school building located at Bristol, Indiana. The original section was built in 1903–1904, with additions made in 1923, 1925, and 1949. The original building is a two-story, Colonial Revival style brick and limestone building on a raised basement. The original building measures 61 feet by 61 feet. The building houses the Elkhart County Historical Museum.

It was added to the National Register of Historic Places in 1991.

The building now functions as the Elkhart Historical Museum, which was established in 1968 through a partnership between the Elkhart Historical Society and the Elkhart County Parks Department. The museum is home to 30,000 artifacts and serves approximately 10,000 patrons a year.
