= Gabrielle Reed =

American beauty pageant titleholder

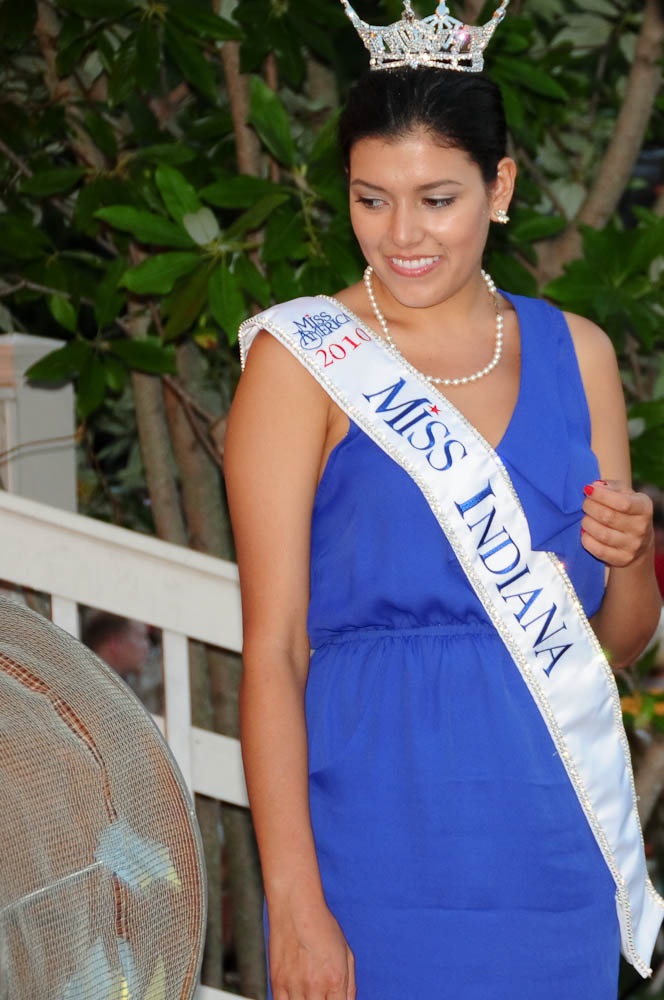
- Born: Gabrielle Reed; 1988 (age 37–38); Bloomington, Indiana, U.S.
- Beauty pageant titleholder
- Title: Miss Indiana University 2008; Miss Heart of Indiana 2009; Miss Southern Heartland 2010; Miss Indiana 2010
- Major competition: Miss America 2011

Gabrielle Reed (born 1988) is an American beauty pageant titleholder who was crowned Miss Indiana 2010 and competed in the Miss America 2011 Pageant on January 15, 2011, in Las Vegas, Nevada. She is a 22-year-old student at the Indiana University Jacobs School of Music who competed at Miss Indiana as Miss Southern Heartland. She also competed at Miss Indiana in 2008 & 2009, placing as 2nd runner-up in 2009. Besides winning the title of Miss Indiana 2010, she also won a Preliminary Talent Award for her performance of "You'll Never Walk Alone." Her platform is "Empowerment from the Start, Communities Preventing Domestic Violence." She chose this as her platform as her mother was a survivor of domestic violence.

Preceded by Nicole Pollard	Miss Indiana; 2010	Succeeded by Jackie Jerlecki
