= Miss Indiana Teen USA =

Beauty pageant competition

- Formation: 1983
- Type: Beauty pageant
- Headquarters: Carmel
- Location: Indiana
- Members: Miss Teen USA
- Official language: English
- Leader: Executive State Director
- Key people: JScot Reid
- Website: Official website

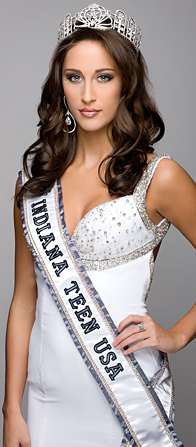
Bailee Zimmerman, Miss Indiana Teen USA 2009

The Miss Indiana Teen USA competition is the pageant that selects the representative for the state of Indiana in the Miss Teen USA pageant. This pageant is currently produced by Empower2 Productions. It was formerly produced by Sanders & Associates based in Buckhannon, West Virginia.

Indiana had a slow start at Miss Teen USA, and did not place until 1991. That placement became the first of a four-year streak, which included three semi-finalist and one 1st runner-up placings.

Nine Indiana teens have gone on to win the Miss Indiana USA crown, more than most other states. The most successful of these, Kelly Lloyd, who achieved Indiana's highest ever Miss Teen USA placement, also went on to earn one of Indiana's highest placements in 2002. Even more notable, Lloyd was a Triple Crown winner.

The current titleholder is Kiersten Alvarado of Indianapolis, who was crowned on June 28, 2026, at Noblesville High School in Noblesville. She will represent Indiana at Miss Teen USA 2026.

== Results summary ==
=== Placements ===
- 1st runner-up: Kelly Lloyd (1993)
- 3rd runner-up: Paige Robinson (2017), Kiersten Alvarado (2026)
- 4th runner-up: Jillian Dornbush (2001)
- Top 10/12: Heather Hart (1991), Nicole Llewellyn (1992), Nicolette Van Hook (1994), Kera Boog (2000)
- Top 15: Jami Stallings (2003), Jessica Michelle Buch (2011), Zoe Parker (2014)

Indiana holds a record of 11 placements at Miss Teen USA.

=== Awards ===
- Miss Photogenic: Jillian Dornbush (2001), Lexi Gryszowka (2021)
- Best in Fitness & Activewear: Kiersten Alvarado (2026)

== Winners ==
- Declared as Winner
- Ended as runner-up
- Ended as one of the finalists or semifinalists

Year	Name	Hometown	Age^{1}	Local Title	Placement at Miss Teen USA	Special awards at Miss Teen USA	Notes
2026	Kiersten Alvarado	Indianapolis	18	Miss Central Indiana Teen	3rd runner-up	Best in Fitness & Activewear	
2025	Kaelin Broad	Carmel	17	Miss Carmel Teen			
2024	Aleah Dean	Southern Indiana	17	Miss Southern Indiana Teen			
2023	Kinley Shoemaker	Indianapolis	18	Miss Indianapolis Teen			Later Miss Indiana 2025
2022	KK Kokonaing	Huntertown	18	Miss Allen County			First Burmese American Teen state titleholder in Miss Teen USA history
2021	Lexi Gryszowka	Bloomington	17	Miss Bloomington Teen		Miss Photogenic	
2020	Jinnie Tomes	Indianapolis	18				
2019	Catelyn Combellick	Carmel	15				Later Miss Indiana High School America 2020
2018	Ella Harrison	New Albany	16				
2017	Paige Robinson	Indianapolis	19		3rd runner-up		
2016	Lauren Boswell	Fishers	17				
2015	Kassidy Tharp	Sullivan	18				3rd runner up at Miss Indiana's Outstanding Teen 2014
2014	Zoe Parker	Fort Wayne	16		Top 15		
2013	Darrian Arch	Chesterton	17				Later Miss Indiana USA 2018
2012	Mackenzie Surber	Cicero	19				
2011	Jessica Michelle Buch	Bedford	16		Top 15		
2010	Madeline Jean Plesac	Valparaiso	17				
2009	Bailee Zimmerman	Brownsburg	16				
2008	Morgan Abel	North Vernon	17				Later Miss Indiana USA 2016
2007	Victoria Tomlinson	Anderson	18				
2006	Halley Wallace	Evansville	18				
2005	Kristina Ellis	Vincennes	17				
2004	Courtni Hall	Crawfordsville	18				Later Miss Indiana USA 2009
2003	Jami Stallings	Evansville	17		Semi-finalist		Later Miss Indiana USA 2007
2002	Melyssa Ramos	Fort Wayne	18				
2001	Jillian Dornbush	Indianapolis	17		4th runner-up	Miss Photogenic	
2000	Kera Boog	Indianapolis	16		Top 10		
1999	Jennifer Phillips	Avon	17				
1998	Tashina Kastigar	West Terre Haute	17				
1997	Amber Yoder	Indianapolis	15				
1996	Misha Ivetich	Indianapolis	18				
1995	Sarah Jane McClary	Evansville	16				Later Miss Indiana USA 2001
1994	Nicolette VanHook	Crawfordsville	16		Semi-finalist		
1993	Kelly Lloyd	Indianapolis	16		1st runner-up		Triple Crown winner: Later Miss Indiana 1999; Later Miss Indiana USA 2002; 2nd runner up to Miss USA 2002; 2nd runner-up to National Sweetheart 1998; Previously served as the director of operations for the Miss Indiana USA and Miss Indiana Teen USA pageants
1992	Nicole Llewellyn	Munster	16		Semi-finalist		Later Miss Indiana USA 1998; She also won Mrs. Indiana 2001, Mrs. America 2001, and Mrs. World 2002 under her married name, Nicole Brink.
1991	Heather Hart	Newburgh	17		Semi-finalist		Later Miss Indiana USA 1995
1990	Kristen Helm	Indianapolis	17				
1989	Jackie Hartt	Indianapolis	17				
1988	Deborah Lindboe	Martinsville	16				
1987	Terri Salmon	Hammond	16				
1986	Danielle Wayne	Indianapolis	17				
1985	Dianna Bullard	Portage	17				
1984	Christine Harrell	Rolling Prairie	19				Married Sean Astin in 1992
1983	Julie James	Warsaw	17				

^{1} Age at the time of the Miss Teen USA pageant
