= Miss Indiana's Teen =

Beauty contest

- Formation: 2005
- Type: Beauty pageant
- Headquarters: Indianapolis
- Location: Indiana
- Members: Miss America's Teen
- Official language: English
- Key people: Aren (Howell) Straiger (executive director)
- Website: Official website

The Miss Indiana's Teen competition is the pageant that selects the representative for the U.S. state of Indiana in the Miss America's Teen pageant.

Lily Bauer of Granger was crowned Miss Indiana's Teen on June 20, 2026, at the STAR Bank Performing Arts Center in Zionsville, Indiana. She competed for the title of Miss America's Teen 2027 on September 5, 2026, at the Kravis Center for the Performing Arts in West Palm Beach, Florida.

In January 2023, the official name of the pageant was changed from Miss Indiana's Outstanding Teen, to Miss Indiana's Teen, in accordance with the national pageant.

== Results summary ==
The following is a visual summary of the past results of Miss Indiana's Outstanding Teen titleholders presented in the table below. The year in parentheses indicates year of the Miss America's Outstanding Teen competition in which the placement and/or award was garnered.

=== Placements ===
- 2nd runners-up: Audrey Ferguson (2016)
- Top 10: Sarah Gorecki (2006), Morgan Jackson (2008), Lydia Daley (2010), Katelyn Marak (2011)
- Top 12: Ellie Barmes (2018)
- Top 15: Hadley Abram (2020)

=== Awards ===
==== Preliminary awards ====
- Preliminary Talent: Lydia Daley (2010), Addison Chattin (2026)

==== Other awards ====
- Teens in Action Finalist: Kate Dimmett (2022)
- Teens in Action Winner: Lily Bauer (2027)

== Winners ==
- Declared as winner
- Ended as a runner-up
- Ended as a finalist or semi-finalist

Year	Name	Hometown	Age	Local title	Talent	Placement at MAO Teen	Special scholarships at MAO Teen	Notes
2026	Lily Bauer	Granger	17	Miss Southern Heartland's Teen	Lyrical Dance		Teens in Action Award Winner	Younger sister of Miss Indiana's Teen 2024, Bella Bauer
2025	Addison Chattin	Vincennes	18	Miss Northeast's Teen	Lyrical Dance		Preliminary Talent Award	
2024	Bella Bauer	Granger	18	Miss Metropolitan's Teen	Lyrical Dance			3rd Runner Up, Preliminary Talent and Evening Gown winner at Miss Indiana 2026. Older sister of Miss Indiana's Teen 2026, Lily Bauer
2023	Keegan Connor	Westfield	16	Miss South Bend's Teen	Musical Theatre Vocal			
2022	Kayla Patterson	Farmland		Miss Duneland's Outstanding Teen	Vocal			
2021	Kate Dimmett	Zionsville	18	Miss Metropolitan's Outstanding Teen	Classical Violin, "Praeludium and Allegro” by Fritz Kreisler		Teens in Action Finalist	Later Miss Illinois 2026, 2nd Runner Up to Miss America
2019-20	Hadley Abram	Bloomington	17	Miss Metropolitan's Outstanding Teen	Musical Theater Jazz Dance, "Let's Be Bad" from Smash	Top 15		2nd Runner Up at Miss Indiana 2024
2018	Jenna Zabona	Kendallville	15	Miss Metropolitan's Outstanding Teen	Jazz Dance, "The Way You Make Me Feel"			Miss Limberlost 2022. Top 11 at Miss Indiana 2025. 4th Runner Up at Miss Indiana 2026. Miss Fort Wayne 2027.
2017	Ellie Barmes	Vincennes	17	Miss Metropolitan's Outstanding Teen	Vocal	Top 12		Miss Southern Heartland 2019
2016	Jordan Axel	Kendallville	17	Miss Fort Wayne's Outstanding Teen	Tap Dance			Miss Fort Wayne 2019
2015	Audrey Ferguson	Evansville	17	Miss Central Indiana's Outstanding Teen	Vocal	2nd runner-up		
2014	Maddison Bryan	LaOtto	16	Miss Three Rivers Festival's Outstanding Teen	Clogging			
2013	Kylie Wheeler	Georgetown	15	Miss Harvest Homecoming's Outstanding Teen	Tap Dance			
2012	Brooke Campbell	Avilla	16	Miss Limberlost's Outstanding Teen	Tap Dance			
2011	Brianna DeCamp	Kendallville	16	Miss Limberlost's Outstanding Teen	Tap Dance			Later Miss Indiana 2016
2010	Katelyn Marak	Kouts	16	Miss Indiana South's Outstanding Teen	Vocal	Top 10		
2009	Lydia Daley	Fort Wayne		Miss Northeast's Outstanding Teen	Vocal	Top 10	Preliminary Talent Award	
2008	Megan Thwaites	Garrett	16	Miss Three Rivers Festival's Outstanding Teen	Dance			4th runner-up at Miss Indiana 2012 pageant
2007	Morgan Jackson	Charlestown	13	Miss Harvest Homecoming's Outstanding Teen	Dance	Top 10		Daughter of Miss New Mexico 1984, Trina Collins Later Miss Indiana 2015
2006	Leanna Ross	New Carlisle	17	Miss Hoosier Heartland's Outstanding Teen	Dance/Twirl			
2005	Sarah Gorecki	LaPorte	16	Miss Duneland's Outstanding Teen	Vocal, “River Deep, Mountain High”	Top 10		
