= National Register of Historic Places listings in Forsyth County, Georgia =

This is a list of properties and districts in Forsyth County, Georgia that are listed on the National Register of Historic Places (NRHP).

This National Park Service list is complete through NPS recent listings posted March 21, 2025.

== Current listings ==
	Name on the Register	Image	Date listed	Location	City or town	Description
1	Cumming Bandstand	Cumming Bandstand	June 20, 2002 (#02000658)	Junction of Main and Dahlonega Sts. 34°12′25″N 84°08′22″W	Cumming	
2	Cumming Cemetery	Cumming Cemetery	May 21, 2005 (#05000428)	Bordered by State Routes 9 and 20 and Resthaven Dr. 34°12′18″N 84°08′16″W	Cumming	
3	Cumming Public School-Cumming High School	Cumming Public School-Cumming High School	February 18, 2000 (#00000107)	101 School St. 34°12′29″N 84°08′13″W	Cumming	
4	Fowler Family Farm	Fowler Family Farm	April 11, 2003 (#03000200)	3813 Atlanta Highway; 34°09′18″N 84°12′36″W	Cumming	
5	Poole's Mill Covered Bridge	Poole's Mill Covered Bridge	April 1, 1975 (#75000593)	Northwest of Cumming off State Route 369 on Poole's Mill Rd. 34°17′27″N 84°14′33″W	Cumming	
