= Washington Township, Elkhart County, Indiana =

Washington Township
- Township
- Location of Washington Township in Elkhart County
- Coordinates: 41°43′54″N 85°49′55″W
- Country: United States
- State: Indiana
- County: Elkhart

Government
  - Type: Indiana township

Area
  - Total: 26.1 sq mi (68 km^{2})
  - Land: 25.33 sq mi (65.6 km^{2})
  - Water: 0.76 sq mi (2.0 km^{2})
- Elevation: 778 ft (237 m)

Population (2020)
  - Total: 6,892
  - Density: 274.1/sq mi (105.8/km^{2})
- FIPS code: 18-80594
- GNIS feature ID: 453994

Washington Township is one of sixteen townships in Elkhart County, Indiana, USA. At the 2000 census, its population was 6,945.

== History ==
It is named after George Washington.

== Geography ==
According to the 2010 census, the township has a total area of 26.1 square miles (68 km^{2}), of which 25.33 square miles (65.6 km^{2}) (or 97.05%) is land and 0.76 square miles (2.0 km^{2}) (or 2.91%) is water.

=== Cities and towns ===
- Bristol

=== Unincorporated towns ===
- Nibbyville

(This list is based on USGS data and may include former settlements.)

=== Major highways ===
- I-80
- I-90
- Indiana Toll Road
- SR 15
- SR 120

=== Cemeteries ===
The township contains four cemeteries: Cathcart, Oak Ridge, Proctor and Trout Creek.
