= Fowler-Loomis House =

Historic house in New York, United States

- U.S. National Register of Historic Places
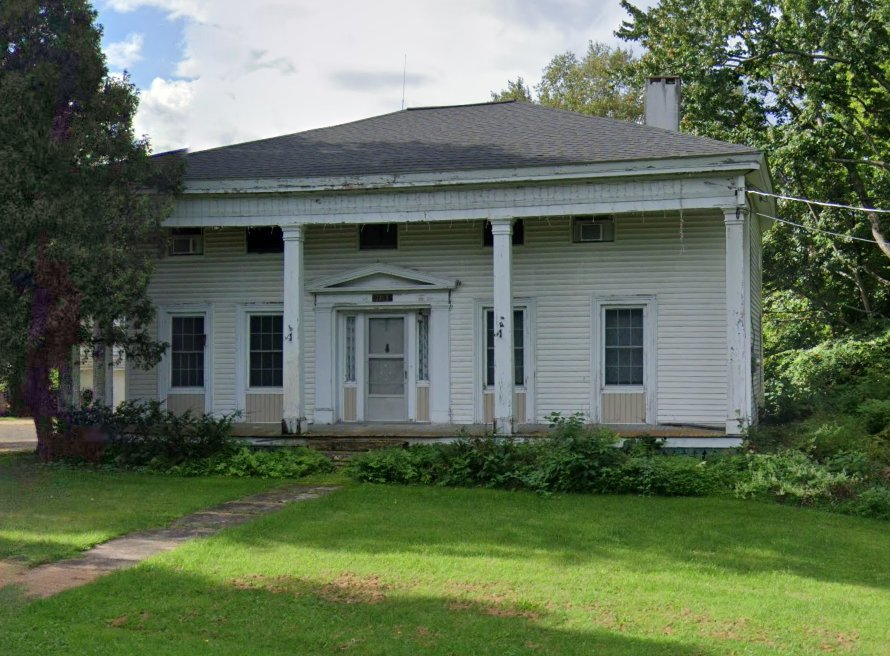

- Location within New York Location within the United States
- Location: 6022 Main St. Mexico, New York
- Coordinates: 43°27′32″N 76°13′16″W
- Area: 1.8 acres (0.73 ha)
- Built: 1847
- Architectural style: Greek Revival
- MPS: Mexico MPS
- NRHP reference No.: 91001628
- Added to NRHP: November 14, 1991

Fowler-Loomis House is a historic home located at Mexico in Oswego County, New York. It is a large, square, 1 1/2-story wood-frame house in the Greek Revival style. The residence was built in 1847 and is a full five bays in width with a low-rise hipped roof. It features a full-length, 2-story portico supported by four massive square columns.

It was listed on the National Register of Historic Places in 1991.
