= Forsyth County Courthouse (North Carolina) =

Courthouse in Forsyth Country, North Carolina

- U.S. National Register of Historic Places
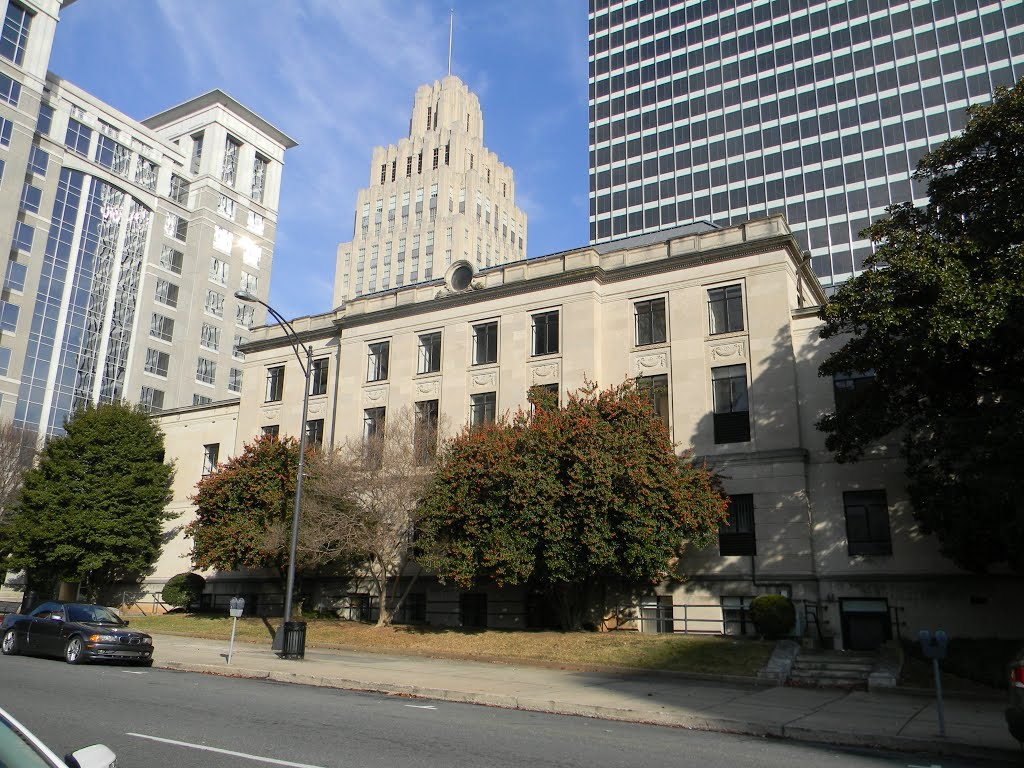
- Forsyth County Courthouse, 2012

- Location within North Carolina Location within the United States
- Interactive map showing the location of Forsyth County Courthouse
- Location: 11 W. 3rd St., Winston-Salem, North Carolina
- Coordinates: 36°05′53″N 80°14′40″W
- Area: 0.91 acres (0.37 ha)
- Built: 1896, 1926, 1959–1960
- Architect: Northup & O’Brien
- Architectural style: Beaux Arts, Romanesque Revival
- NRHP reference No.: 13000205
- Added to NRHP: April 23, 2013

Forsyth County Courthouse is a historic county courthouse located at Winston-Salem, Forsyth County, North Carolina. It was built in 1926, and is a three-story, limestone clad, Beaux-Arts style building that incorporates interior elements of the earlier 1896, Romanesque Revival style courthouse. Between 1959 and 1960, additions were built onto the front and rear. It has been converted into private apartments and in 2018, was owned by Winston Courthouse LLC. In front of it for decades was the Confederate Soldiers Monument, which was removed in 2019.

It was listed on the National Register of Historic Places in 2013.
