= Sri Vyshnavi Yarlagadda =

Indian mnemonist (born 1995)

Personal information
- Full name: Sri Vyshnavi Yarlagadda
- Nationality: Indian
- Born: 6 December 1995 (age 30) Hyderabad, Telangana, India
- Height: 165 cm (5 ft 5 in)

Sport
- Country: India
- Sport: Memory sport
- Rank: 31 [WOMEN'S RANKING] 158 [OVERALL RANKING]

Achievements and titles
- Highest world ranking: 2 - Names and Faces Event (20 October 2013)

Sri Vyshnavi Yarlagadda (born 6 December 1995) is an International Grandmaster of Memory. She attained her career-best rank no. 2 in October 2013 in Names and Faces event by the World Memory Sports Council. She is the first Indian to win an open category medal at the World Memory Championships. She achieved this feat by winning the gold medal in Names and Faces event at the 20th World Memory Championship 2011 on 7 December 2011 in Guangzhou, China.

She is the first Indian to set a Junior World Record and also the first Indian woman to win a gold medal in World Junior Memory Championships. She completed a hat-trick in 2012 by winning the gold medal on 14 December 2012 at the World Memory championship in London. She is the youngest and the first woman in India to achieve the International Master of Memory title. She was honored by the President of India, Shri. Pranab Mukherjee as one of the top 100 women achievers of India on 22 January 2016 at Rashtrapathi Bhawan. She was one of the five sportsperson to have won the award.

== Early life ==
Sri Vyshnavi completed her schooling in Hyderabad. She is a psychology graduate from Osmania University. She played Chess and won state championships. Her family hails from Vijayawada.

== Records ==
=== World Records ===
Year	Record
2011	Junior World Record in 15 min Names and Faces
2012	Junior World Record in 5 min Names and Faces
2012	Junior World Record in 15 min Names and Faces - Broke her own record
2013	Women's World Record in 5 min Names and Faces - Broke her own record

All the above records were set at competitions affiliated to the World Memory Sports Council.

=== National Records ===
Year	Record
2011	5 min Names and Faces
2011	15 min Names and Faces
2012	5 min Names and Faces - Broke her own record
2012	15 min Names and Faces - Broke her own record
2013	5 min Names and Faces - Broke her own record
2013	15 min Names and Faces - Broke her own record
2013	Historic and Future Dates
2014	15 min Names and Faces - Broke her own record
2014	Historic and Future Dates - Broke her own record
2014	30 min Binary Digits
2015	30 min Random Numbers
2015	Long Numbers (1 hour)
2016	15 min Names and Faces - Broke her own record
2019	30 min Random Numbers - Broke her own record
2019	30 min Random Cards

All the above records were set at competitions affiliated to the World Memory Sports Council.

== Titles ==
- International Master of Memory - 2015
- International Grandmaster of Memory - 2017

== Awards ==
Awards
Rashtra Telugu Mahila Puraskar (2014)
Abhinandana Best Lady Award (2015)
TANA Award for Meritorious Achievements-Youth (2015)
#100Women Achievers Award by The Government of India (2016)
Nari Niyogin Award by S.P.E.W (2017)
Nari Shakti Award by Iwoman Awards (2018)

== Medal Records ==
=== 2010 ===
Championship	Event	Medal
(India) Indian National Memory Championships	Names and Faces	Gold
(China) World Junior Memory Championship	Names and Faces	Gold

=== 2011 ===
Championship	Event	Medal
(China) World Memory Championship	Names and Faces	Gold
(China) World Junior Memory Championship	Names and Faces	Gold
(India) Indian National Memory Championships	Names and Faces	Gold
(India) Indian National Memory Championships	Historic and future dates	Silver
(India) Indian National Memory Championships	Binary Digits	Silver

=== 2012 ===
Championship	Event	Medal
(United Kingdom) World Junior Memory Championship	Overall	Bronze
(United Kingdom) World Memory Championship	Names and Faces	Gold
(United Kingdom) World Junior Memory Championship	Names and Faces	Gold
(United Kingdom) World Junior Memory Championship	Historic and future dates	Silver
(United Kingdom) World Junior Memory Championship	One hour Numbers	Silver
(United Kingdom) World Junior Memory Championship	Abstract Images	Bronze
(United Kingdom) World Junior Memory Championship	Binary Digits	Bronze
(India) Indian National Memory Championships	Names and Faces	Gold
(India) Indian National Memory Championships	Historic and future dates	Gold
(India) Indian National Memory Championships	Binary Digits	Bronze

=== 2013 ===
Championship	Event	Medal
(India) Indian National Memory Championships	Overall	Silver
(India) Indian National Memory Championships	Names and Faces	Gold
(India) Indian National Memory Championships	Binary Digits	Silver
(India) Indian National Memory Championships	Historic and future dates	Silver
(India) Indian National Memory Championships	15 Minute Numbers	Silver
(India) Indian National Memory Championships	Random Words	Silver
(India) Indian National Memory Championships	Abstract Images	Bronze
(India) Indian National Memory Championships	10 Minute Cards	Bronze
(India) Indian National Memory Championships	Speed Numbers	Bronze

=== 2014 ===
Championship	Event	Medal
(India) Indian National Memory Championships	Overall	Silver
(India) Indian Open Adult Memory Championships	Overall	Bronze
(India) Indian Open Memory Championships	Names and Faces	Gold
(India) Indian Open Memory Championships	Random Words	Bronze
(India) Indian Open Memory Championships	Historic/Future Dates	Bronze
(India) Indian National Memory Championships	Random Words	Gold
(India) Indian National Memory Championships	Binary Digits	Gold
(India) Indian National Memory Championships	Names and Faces	Gold
(India) Indian National Memory Championships	Random Numbers	Silver
(India) Indian National Memory Championships	Historic and Future Dates	Silver
(India) Indian National Memory Championships	Spoken Numbers	Silver
(India) Indian National Memory Championships	Abstract Images	Bronze

=== 2015 ===
Championship	Event	Medal
(India) Indian National Memory Championships	Overall	Silver
(Hong Kong) Asian Memory Championships	Names and Faces	Gold
(Hong Kong) HongKong Open Memory Championship	Names and Faces	Silver
(India) Indian Memory Championship	Names and Faces	Gold
(India) Indian Memory Championship	10 min cards	Gold
(India) Indian Memory Championship	Binary Digits	Silver
(India) Indian Memory Championship	Random Numbers	Silver
(India) Indian Memory Championship	Historic and future dates	Silver
(India) Indian Memory Championship	Speed Numbers	Silver
(India) Indian Memory Championship	Random Words	Silver
(China) World Memory Championship	Names and Faces	Bronze

=== 2016 ===
Championship	Event	Medal
(India) Indian National Memory Championships	Overall	Silver
(India) Indian Memory Championship	Names and Faces	Gold
(India) Indian Memory Championship	5 min Words	Silver
(India) Indian Memory Championship	10 min Cards	Silver
(India) Indian Memory Championship	Speed Numbers	Silver
(India) Indian Memory Championship	Historic and future dates	Silver
(India) Indian Memory Championship	Speed Cards	Silver
(India) Indian Memory Championship	Random Numbers	Bronze
(India) Indian Memory Championship	Binary Digits	Bronze
(India) Indian Memory Championship	Spoken Numbers	Bronze
(India) Indian Memory Championship	Abstract Images	Bronze
(Singapore) World Memory Championship	Names and Faces	Gold

=== 2017 ===
Championship	Event	Medal
(Indonesia) World Memory Championship	Names and Faces	Bronze

=== 2018 ===
Championship	Event	Medal
(India) Indian National Memory Championships	Overall	Bronze
(India) Indian National Memory Championships	Names and Faces	Silver
(India) Indian National Memory Championships	Historic and future dates	Silver
(India) Indian National Memory Championships	Random Words	Silver
(India) Indian National Memory Championships	Speed Numbers	Bronze
(Hong Kong) World Memory Championships	Names and Faces	Silver

=== 2019 ===
Championship	Event	Medal
(Italy) Italian Open Memory Championships	Overall	Silver
(Italy) Italian Open Memory Championships	Names and Faces	Gold
(Italy) Italian Open Memory Championships	Random Words	Gold
(Italy) Italian Open Memory Championships	Historic and future dates	Silver
(Italy) Italian Open Memory Championships	Spoken numbers	Silver
(Italy) Italian Open Memory Championships	Abstract Images	Silver
(Italy) Italian Open Memory Championships	Speed Cards	Bronze
(India) Indian Open Memory Championships(WMSC)	Overall	Bronze
(India) Indian Open Memory Championships(WMSC)	Names and Faces	Gold
(India) Indian Open Memory Championships(WMSC)	Random Numbers	Silver
(India) Indian Open Memory Championships(WMSC)	Historic and Future Dates	Silver
(India) Indian Open Memory Championships(WMSC)	Speed Cards	Bronze
(India) Indian Memory Championships(WMSC)	Overall	Silver
(India) Indian Memory Championships(WMSC)	Speed Cards	Gold
(India) Indian Memory Championships(WMSC)	Names and Faces	Gold
(India) Indian Memory Championships(WMSC)	Binary Digits	Silver
(India) Indian Memory Championships(WMSC)	Random Numbers	Silver
(India) Indian Memory Championships(WMSC)	Speed Numbers	Silver
(India) Indian Memory Championships(WMSC)	Historic/Future Dates	Silver
(India) Indian Memory Championships(WMSC)	Random Words	Silver
(India) Indian Memory Championships(WMSC)	Abstract Images	Bronze
(India) Indian Memory Championships(WMSC)	Spoken Numbers	Bronze
(India) Indian Memory Championships(WMSC)	Random Cards	Bronze
(India) Indian Memory Championships(IAM)	Overall	Silver
(India) Indian Memory Championships(IAM)	Speed Cards	Silver
(India) Indian Memory Championships(IAM)	Names and Faces	Silver
(India) Indian Memory Championships(IAM)	Random Numbers	Silver
(India) Indian Memory Championships(IAM)	Speed Numbers	Silver
(India) Indian Memory Championships(IAM)	Historic/Future Dates	Silver
(India) Indian Memory Championships(IAM)	Random Words	Silver
(India) Indian Memory Championships(IAM)	Binary Digits	Bronze
(China) World Memory Championship	Names and Faces	Bronze

== See also ==
Sports

- Memory sport
- Method of loci
- Mind sport
- Mind Sports Olympiad (MSO)
- World Memory Championships

Sports person

- Ben Pridmore
- Dominic O'Brien
- Rajan Mahadevan
- Grand Master of Memory
- List of world championships in mind sports

Misc

- Mnemonist
- Mnemonic major system
