= Rebecca Paul (lottery official) =

American lottery official (born 1949)

Rebecca Paul (born Feb 1949 as Rebecca Sue Graham) is currently the President and CEO of the Tennessee Lottery. Prior to assuming her current position in 2003, Paul gained national fame within the lottery community for operating lotteries in Illinois, Florida, and Georgia.

In 1986 Florida voters elected Republican Bob Martinez as governor, and at the same time, voted in favor of establishing a state lottery to aid education. The new governor recruited Paul as the state's first Lottery Secretary, due largely to her reputation for having turned the Illinois lottery from a moribund operation into one of the most successful lotteries in the United States. Paul was then brought to Georgia for the same purpose in 1993, after Georgia voted to start up a lottery as well.

Paul was already the highest paid lottery official in the United States, prior to being recruited to Tennessee with an even larger compensation package. She is widely regarded as the pre-eminent lottery official in the United States, being described by one state legislator as the "Michael Jordan" of lotteries.

In 2022 she was elected president of the World Lottery Association.

== Pre-lottery years and personal life ==
Paul, a native of Indianapolis, Indiana, is an alumna of Butler University, where she earned a BS degree (1970) and an MS degree (1975) from the College of Education.

Paul was selected as Miss Indiana 1972, and was the fourth runner-up in the 1973 Miss America Pageant, losing to Terry Anne Meeuwsen (best known as co-host of The 700 Club). After her pageant days, Paul was hired as a "weather girl" at a station in Indianapolis. She married Terry Paul, a construction executive and 1968 graduate of Butler University, and in 1977, when he took a new position in Illinois, she was hired at WICS, the then-NBC affiliate in Springfield, Illinois. While living in the state capital, Paul became involved with Republican party politics, rising to the position of party co-chair, before being tapped to run the Illinois Lottery.

In 1999, while Paul was living in Atlanta and running that state's lottery, her husband died. When she moved to Tennessee, she met state legislator Jere Hargrove, who was a Democratic member of the Tennessee House of Representatives. Hargrove did not seek re-election in 2006, and the day after the election, on November 8, 2006, Hargrove and Paul were married in 2006 by Governor Phil Bredesen in the governor's mansion. She and Hargrove were divorced in 2021.
