= Forsyth County =

Forsyth County is the name of two counties in the United States:

- Forsyth County, Georgia
- Forsyth County, North Carolina
