= Bristol, Indiana =

- Town
- Logo

- Location of Bristol in Elkhart County, Indiana.
- Coordinates: 41°43′05″N 85°49′23″W
- Country: United States
- State: Indiana
- County: Elkhart
- Township: Washington

Area
  - Total: 4.16 sq mi (10.78 km^{2})
  - Land: 4.02 sq mi (10.41 km^{2})
  - Water: 0.14 sq mi (0.37 km^{2})
- Elevation: 771 ft (235 m)

Population (2020)
  - Total: 1,789
  - Density: 445.1/sq mi (171.85/km^{2})
- Time zone: UTC-5 (EST)
  - Summer (DST): UTC-5 (EST)
- ZIP code: 46507
- Area code: 574
- FIPS code: 18-07750
- GNIS ID: 2396602
- Website: bristol.in.gov

Bristol is a town in Washington Township, Elkhart County, Indiana, United States. As of the 2020 census, Bristol had a population of 1,789.

== History ==
Bristol was platted about 1835, making it one of the oldest towns in Elkhart County. It was named after the city of Bristol, in England.

The Bristol-Washington Township School, Solomon Fowler Mansion, and St. John of the Cross Episcopal Church, Rectory and Cemetery are listed on the National Register of Historic Places.

== Geography ==
According to the 2010 census, Bristol has a total area of 3.82 square miles (9.89 km^{2}), of which 3.69 square miles (9.56 km^{2}) (or 96.6%) is land and 0.13 square miles (0.34 km^{2}) (or 3.4%) is water.

== Demographics ==
Historical population
Census	Pop.	Note	%±
1870	681		—
1880	661		−2.9%
1890	535		−19.1%
1900	546		2.1%
1910	535		−2.0%
1920	568		6.2%
1930	699		23.1%
1940	694		−0.7%
1950	738		6.3%
1960	991		34.3%
1970	1,100		11.0%
1980	1,203		9.4%
1990	1,133		−5.8%
2000	1,382		22.0%
2010	1,602		15.9%
2020	1,789		11.7%
U.S. Decennial Census

=== 2020 census ===
As of the 2020 census, Bristol had a population of 1,789. The median age was 37.5 years. 24.3% of residents were under the age of 18 and 15.7% of residents were 65 years of age or older. For every 100 females there were 99.0 males, and for every 100 females age 18 and over there were 97.1 males age 18 and over.

94.2% of residents lived in urban areas, while 5.8% lived in rural areas.

There were 717 households in Bristol, of which 31.7% had children under the age of 18 living in them. Of all households, 44.6% were married-couple households, 19.0% were households with a male householder and no spouse or partner present, and 24.5% were households with a female householder and no spouse or partner present. About 26.4% of all households were made up of individuals and 8.3% had someone living alone who was 65 years of age or older.

There were 768 housing units, of which 6.6% were vacant. The homeowner vacancy rate was 0.8% and the rental vacancy rate was 6.9%.

Racial composition as of the 2020 census
Race	Number	Percent
White	1,494	83.5%
Black or African American	61	3.4%
American Indian and Alaska Native	14	0.8%
Asian	24	1.3%
Native Hawaiian and Other Pacific Islander	0	0.0%
Some other race	54	3.0%
Two or more races	142	7.9%
Hispanic or Latino (of any race)	124	6.9%

=== 2010 census ===
As of the 2010 census, there were 1,602 people, 608 households, and 429 families living in the town. The population density was 434.1 inhabitants per square mile (167.6/km^{2}). There were 737 housing units at an average density of 199.7 per square mile (77.1/km^{2}). The racial makeup of the town was 87.9% White, 2.1% African American, 0.7% Native American, 1.5% Asian, 4.7% from other races, and 3.1% from two or more races. Hispanic or Latino of any race were 10.2% of the population.

There were 608 households, of which 34.4% had children under the age of 18 living with them, 50.8% were married couples living together, 11.8% had a female householder with no husband present, 7.9% had a male householder with no wife present, and 29.4% were non-families. 22.2% of all households were made up of individuals, and 8.2% had someone living alone who was 65 years of age or older. The average household size was 2.62 and the average family size was 3.04.

The median age in the town was 36.4 years. 27% of residents were under the age of 18; 7.5% were between the ages of 18 and 24; 25.3% were from 25 to 44; 26% were from 45 to 64; and 14.4% were 65 years of age or older. The gender makeup of the town was 49.6% male and 50.4% female.

=== 2000 census ===
As of the 2000 census, there were 1,382 people, 539 households, and 368 families living in the town. The population density was 579.8 inhabitants per square mile (223.9/km^{2}). There were 559 housing units at an average density of 234.5 per square mile (90.5/km^{2}). The racial makeup of the town was 90.09% White, 1.16% African American, 0.36% Native American, 1.23% Asian, 0.07% Pacific Islander, 4.27% from other races, and 2.82% from two or more races. Hispanic or Latino of any race were 7.67% of the population.

There were 539 households, out of which 34.9% had children under the age of 18 living with them, 51.9% were married couples living together, 9.8% had a female householder with no husband present, and 31.7% were non-families. 23.9% of all households were made up of individuals, and 5.0% had someone living alone who was 65 years of age or older. The average household size was 2.56 and the average family size was 3.02.

In the town, the population was spread out, with 27.6% under the age of 18, 11.2% from 18 to 24, 31.0% from 25 to 44, 19.5% from 45 to 64, and 10.8% who were 65 years of age or older. The median age was 31 years. For every 100 females, there were 100.0 males. For every 100 females age 18 and over, there were 101.0 males.

The median income for a household in the town was $46,136, and the median income for a family was $54,125. Males had a median income of $35,568 versus $24,938 for females. The per capita income for the town was $20,373. About 5.1% of families and 5.9% of the population were below the poverty line, including 6.9% of those under age 18 and 2.7% of those age 65 or over.

== Education ==
Bristol is served by Elkhart Community Schools.

== Bristol-Washington Township Public Library ==
The town has a free independent lending library, the Bristol-Washington Township Public Library. The current 10,000 square foot building was constructed in 1984. In 2016, it served a population of 6,945 patrons and had 39,000 annual visits. In 2016 the library had a holding of 44,576 items which circulated 77,799 times. The library provides and receives interlibrary loans through the Indiana Share program. The library is home to many adult and children programs alike.

== Notable Buildings ==
- The Bristol Opera House, once known as the Moiser Opera House, was built in 1896. The Elkhart Civic Theatre currently presents plays there.
- The Elkhart County Historical Museum, founded in 1968 as a partnership between Elkhart's Historical Society and County Parks Department, occupies the former Bristol-Washington Township School (AKA Bristol High School). It is home to 30,000 artifacts and receives around 10,000 visits each year.
