= Solomon Fowler Mansion =

Historic house in Indiana, United States

- U.S. National Register of Historic Places
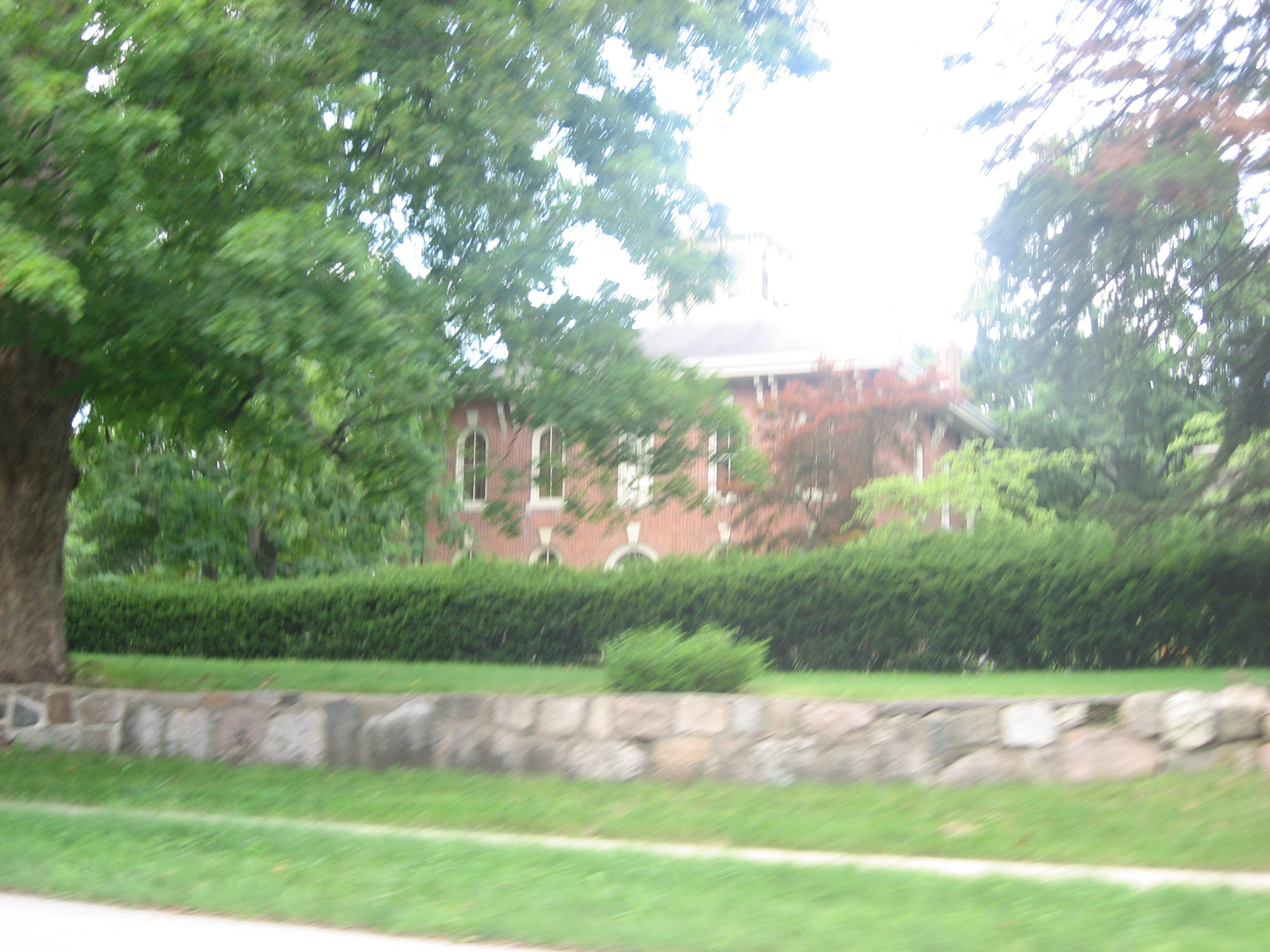
- Solomon Fowler Mansion, July 2013

- Location within Indiana Location within the United States
- Location: 11505 W. Vistula St., Bristol, Indiana
- Coordinates: 41°43′7″N 85°49′48″W
- Area: less than one acre
- Built: 1868-1869
- Architectural style: Italianate
- NRHP reference No.: 03000974
- Added to NRHP: September 28, 2003

Solomon Fowler Mansion is a historic home located at Bristol, Indiana. It was built in 1868–1869, and is a two-story, Italianate style brick dwelling. It has a rear kitchen wing, arched openings, and a moderately pitched hipped roof topped by a cupola. Also on the property are the contributing stone fence, pump and well, tennis courts, and surrounding landscape.

It was added to the National Register of Historic Places in 2003.
