= William Dixon Fowler House =

Historic house in South Carolina, United States

- U.S. National Register of Historic Places
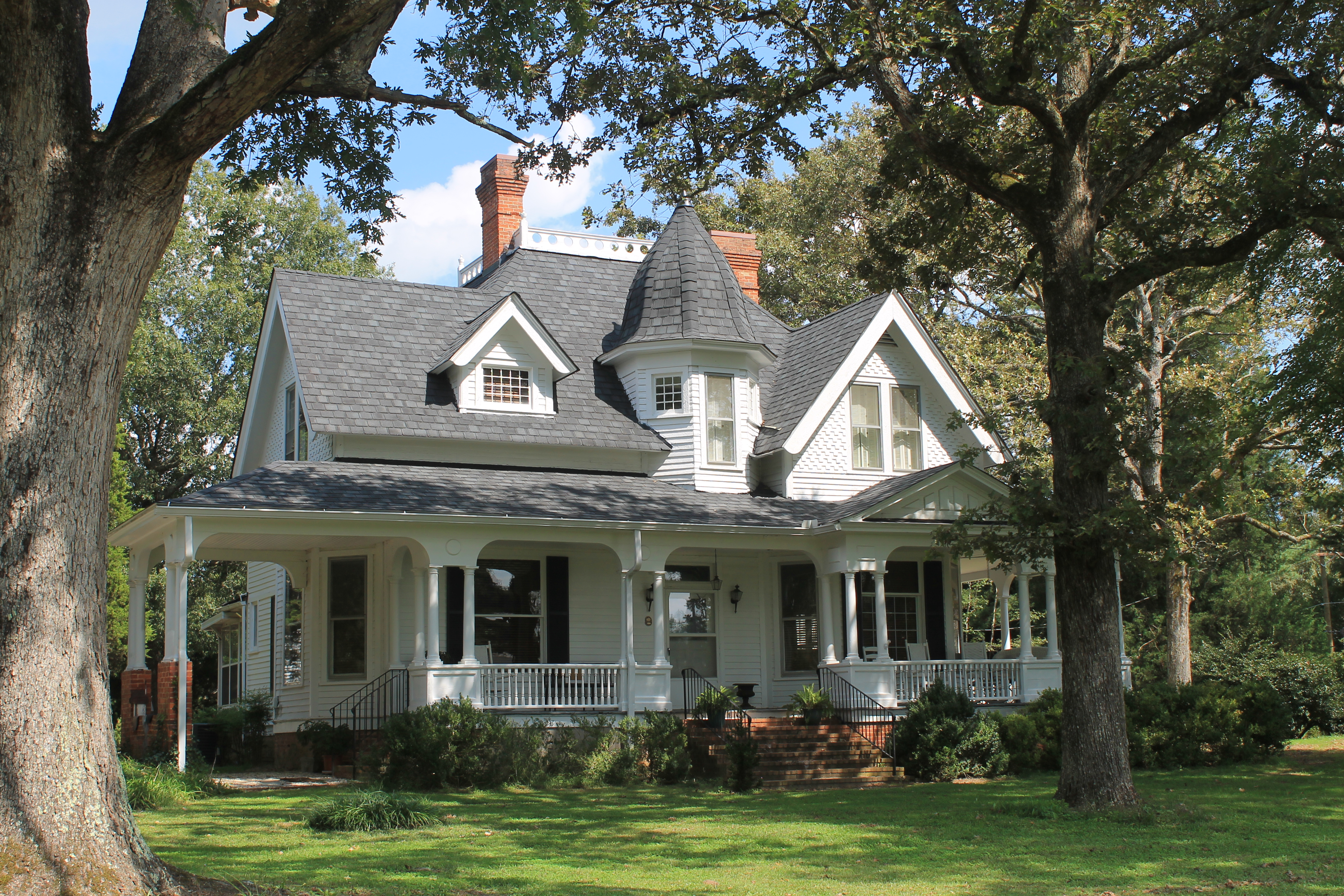

- Location within South Carolina Location within the United States
- Location: 5885 S.C. Highway 215, Pauline vicinity
- Coordinates: 34°48′45.9″N 81°50′23.55″W
- Area: less than one acre
- Built: 1901
- Architect: Barber, George F.; et al.
- Architectural style: Queen Anne
- NRHP reference No.: 12000016
- Added to NRHP: February 8, 2012

The William Dixon Fowler House was built around 1901 in Spartanburg County, South Carolina by William Dixon Fowler. The Queen Anne style house is believed to have been built from plans published by prolific residential architect George F. Barber. The wood-frame house features a high level of carpentry and detailing. The house's chief features are a wrap-around porch, a porte-cochere, and a second-story turret embedded in the slope of the main roof. A contemporaneous smokehouse is also considered a contributing feature.

The Fowler House was listed on the National Register of Historic Places on February 8, 2012.
