= Fowler Apartments =

- U.S. National Register of Historic Places
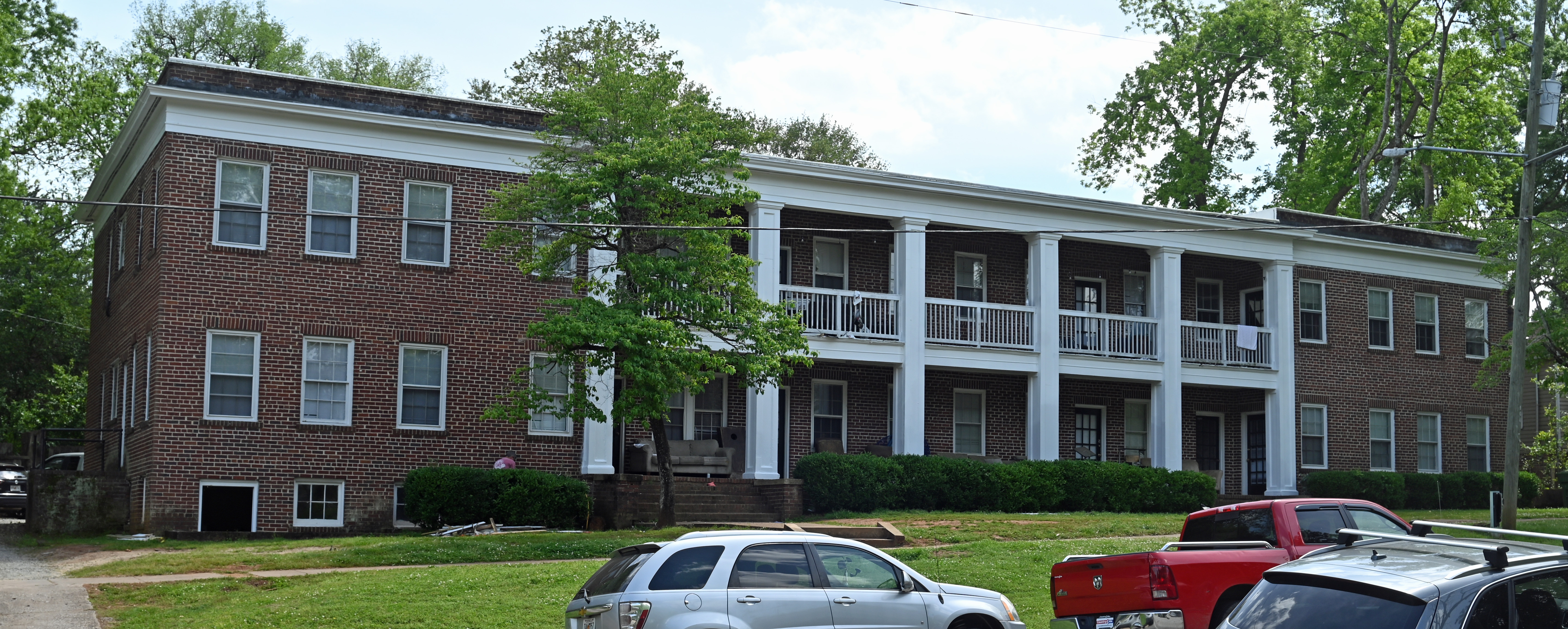
- Fowler Apartments in 2023

- Location within Georgia
- Location: 430 W. McIntosh St., Milledgeville, Georgia
- Coordinates: 33.08123°N 83.23354°W
- Area: 0.4 acres (0.16 ha)
- Built: 1930
- Architectural style: Late 19th and 20th Century Revivals, Colonial Revival
- NRHP reference No.: 97000861
- Added to NRHP: August 21, 1997

The Fowler Apartments, located at 430 W. McIntosh St. in Milledgeville, Georgia, were built in 1930. They were listed on the National Register of Historic Places in 1997.

They were built as upscale apartments.
