= Fowler-Steele House =

Historic house in Vermont, United States

- U.S. National Register of Historic Places
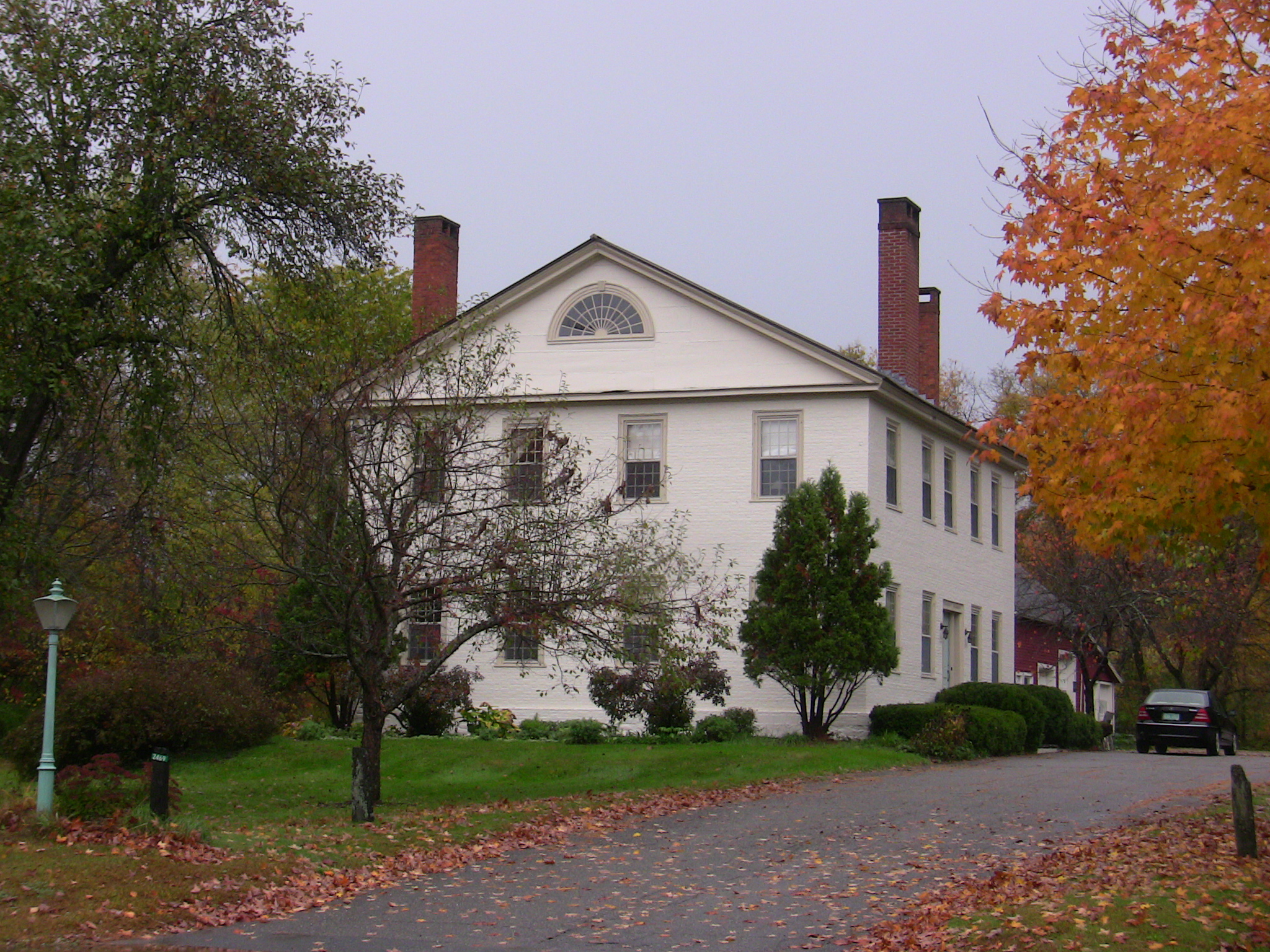

- Location within Vermont
- Location: N. Main St., Windsor, Vermont
- Coordinates: 43°29′24″N 72°23′10″W
- Area: 2 acres (0.81 ha)
- Built: 1805
- Architectural style: Greek Revival, Federal
- NRHP reference No.: 82001710
- Added to NRHP: June 17, 1982

The Fowler-Steele House, also known historically as Ivy Hall, is a historic house on North Main Street in Windsor, Vermont, United States. Built in 1805 and restyled about 1850, it has an architecturally distinctive blend of Federal and Greek Revival styles. It served for many years as a local church parsonage. It was listed on the National Register of Historic Places in 1982.

== Description and history ==
The Fowler-Steele House stands on the northern fringe of Windsor's main village, on the east side of North Main Street just north of Hubbard Brook. Oriented facing south, it is a 2 1/2-story painted brick structure, with a gabled roof and brick foundation. Chimneys are located on the outside of the north and south elevations, an unusual placement for Vermont because snow sliding from the roof can apply pressure to them. The main facade is five bays wide, with a center entrance that is slightly recessed and topped by a transom window. The interior follows a typical Georgian central hall plan, with nearly identical parlors on either side of a central hall, and the kitchen at the northeast corner. The parlors, each accessed by pocket doors, have elaborate Greek Revival trim, while the kitchen and northwest room retain more modest Federal period features. A 1 1/2-story brick ell extends to the rear.

The house was built about 1805 for Bancroft Fowler, the fourth minister of the Windsor Congregational Church, and is located near the site of the first European settlement in what is now Windsor. Fowler gave the house to the church congregation upon his departure from the post in 1819, and it served as the church parsonage until 1835, after which it was sold to the Baptist congregation and became their parsonage. Jason Steele, a local banker, bought the house in 1848, and added the then-fashionable Greek Revival features to the interior and exterior. In 1897 it was purchased by Will Davis, a railroad conductor, who improved its landscaping and dubbed it "Ivy Hall". In the 1960s it was converted for use as a medical office, with modernized interiors, but it has since then returned to residential use and had its interior restored.

 In 2025 the Fowler Steele house opened as All Hallows’ Inn, a Halloween themed bed and breakfast.

== See also ==
- National Register of Historic Places listings in Windsor County, Vermont
