= Pratima Yarlagadda =

Pratima Yarlagadda is an American actress, host, model and beauty queen. She won Miss Indiana USA (1999) and was a finalist in Miss USA (1999). She went on to make Miss Universe history placing in the top six at Miss USA, making her the first woman of East Indian descent to place in the top ten. Her accomplishments were featured in various newspapers and in such publications as India Today recognizing her as a forthcoming East Indian presence in the entertainment industry.

She is from Shipshewana, Indiana.

After moving to New York City Pratima signed with Ford Models. Her work has been featured in such publications as Vogue Italia, Cosmopolitan, Glamour, and Town & Country among others.

Pratima currently resides in Los Angeles where she is represented by Ford Models and Innovative Artists.
