= Miss Indiana =

Beauty pageant competition

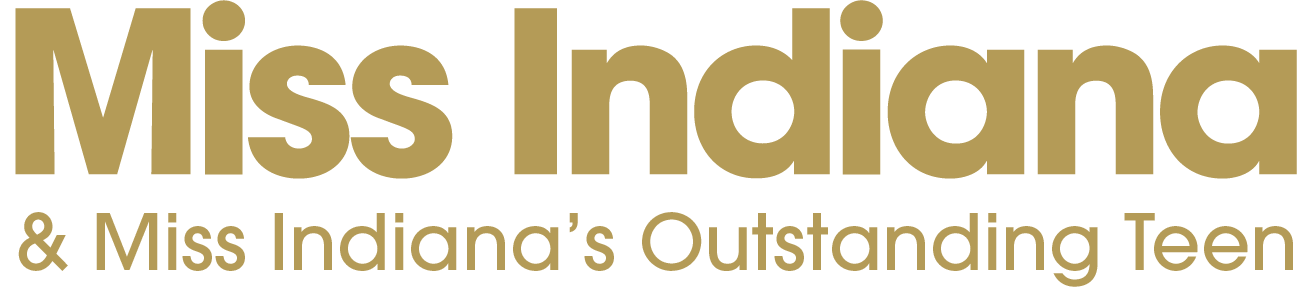
- Formation: 1922
- Type: Beauty pageant
- Headquarters: Indianapolis
- Location: Indiana
- Members: Miss America
- Official language: English
- Key people: Aren Straiger (Executive Director)
- Website: Official website

The Miss Indiana competition is the pageant that selects the representative for the state of Indiana in the Miss America Pageant.

Ellise Edwards of Corydon was crowned Miss Indiana 2026 on June 20, 2026, at STAR Bank Performing Arts Center in Zionsville. She competed for the title of Miss America 2027 on September 6, 2026, at the Kravis Center for the Performing Arts in West Palm Beach, Florida.

== Gallery of past titleholders ==
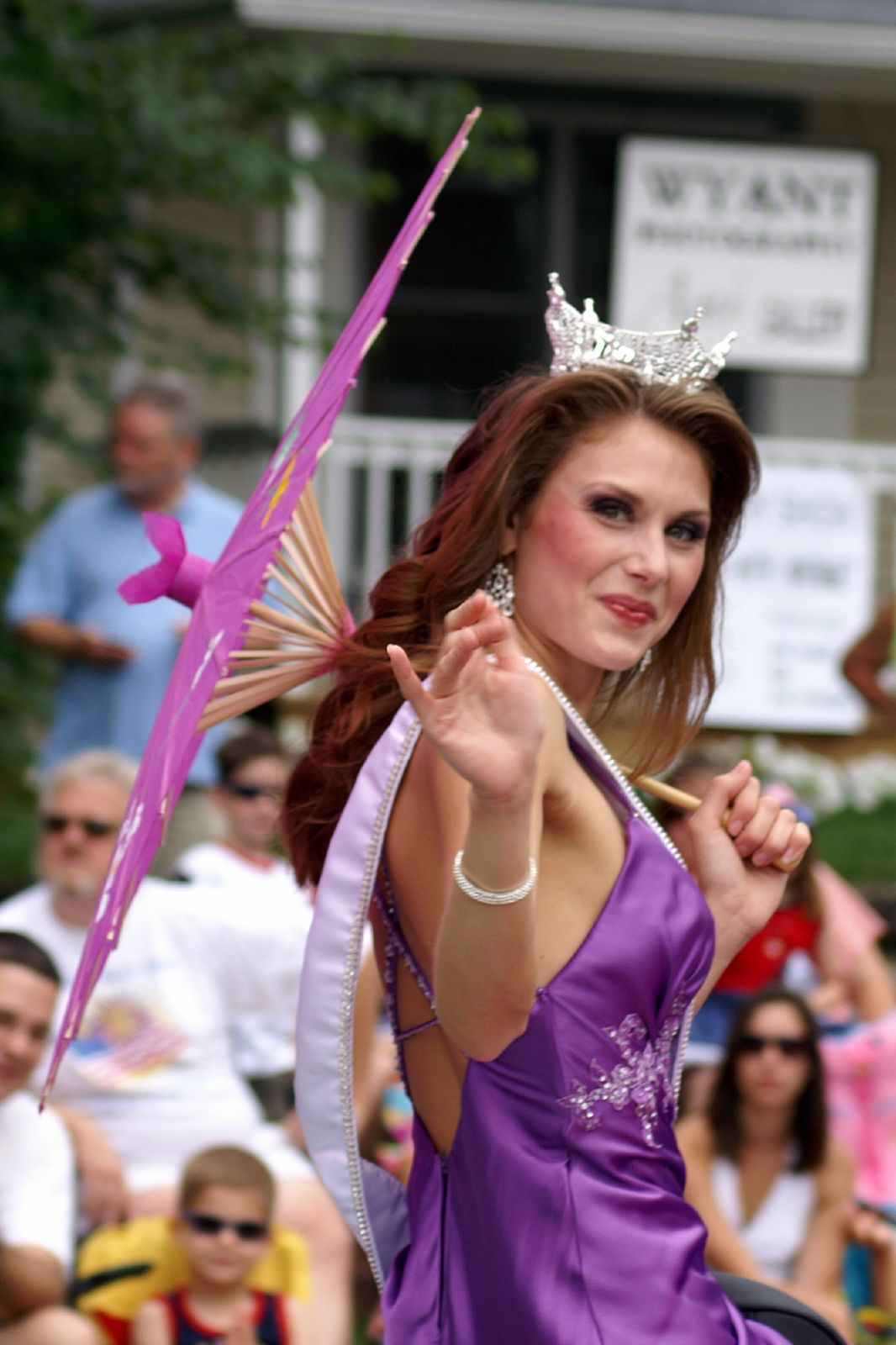
Nicole Rash,
Miss Indiana 2007

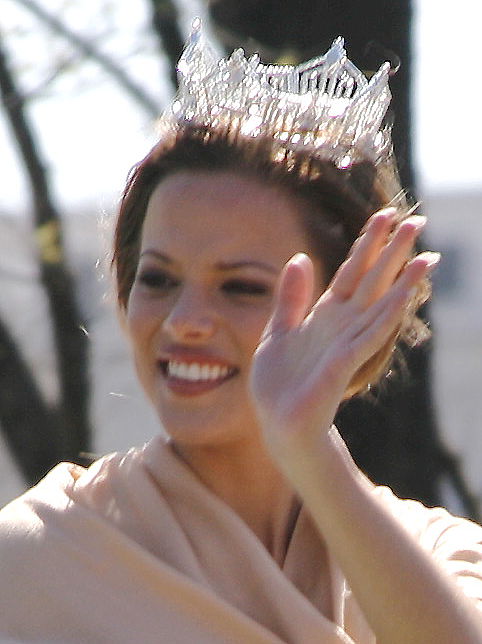
Katie Stam,
Miss Indiana 2008 and Miss America 2009

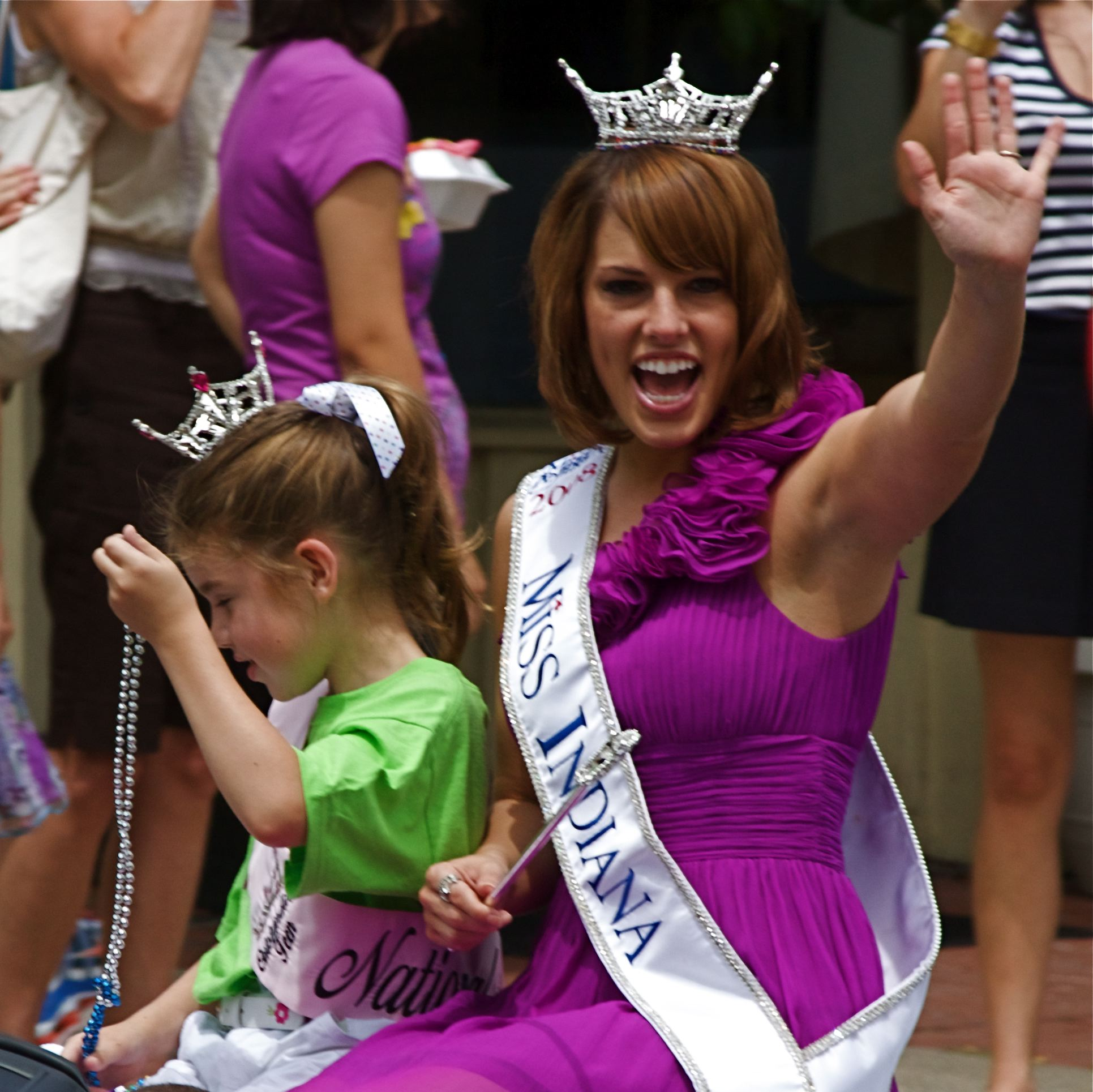
Megan Meadors,
Miss Indiana 2008

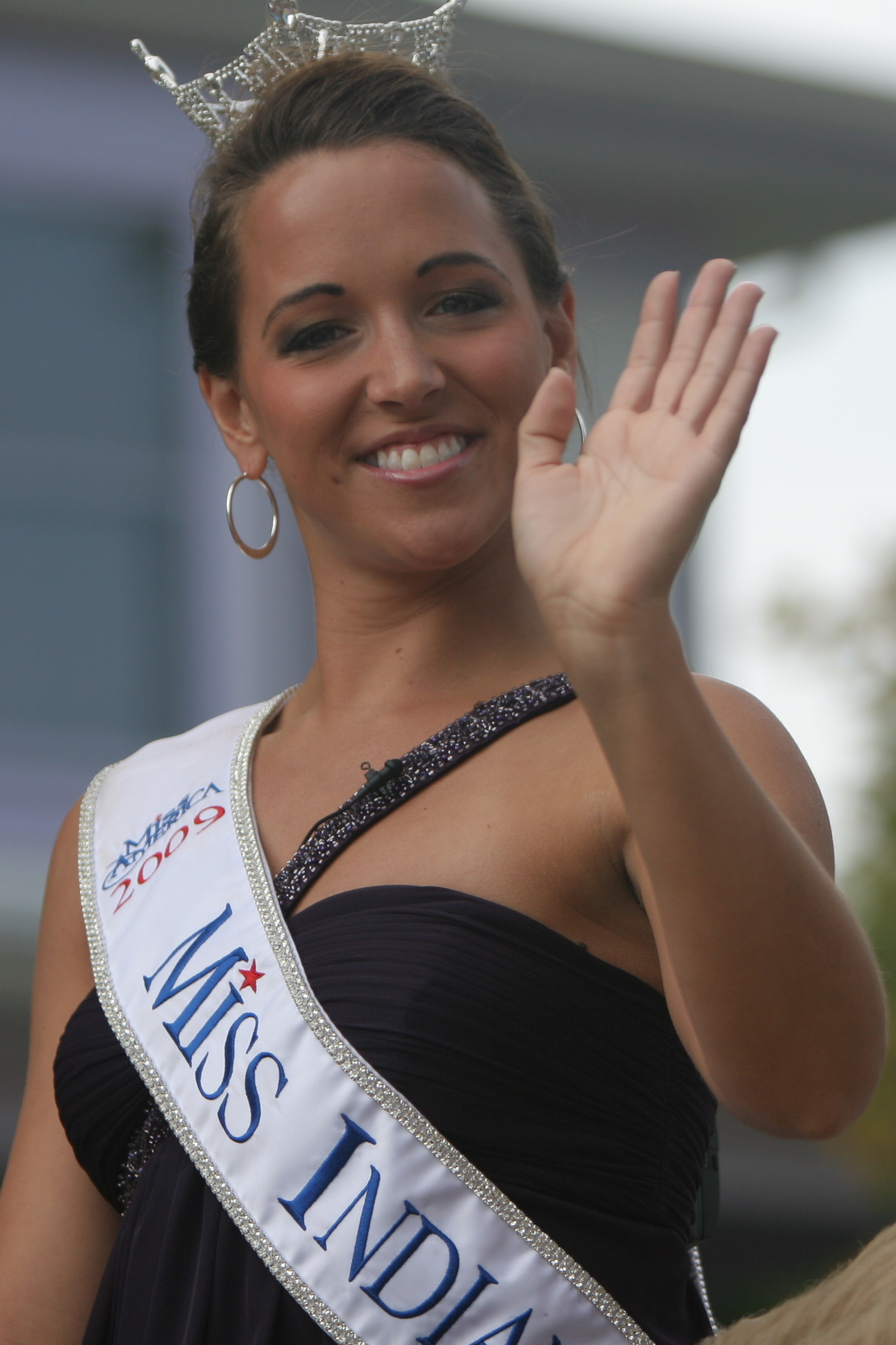
Nicole Pollard,
Miss Indiana 2009

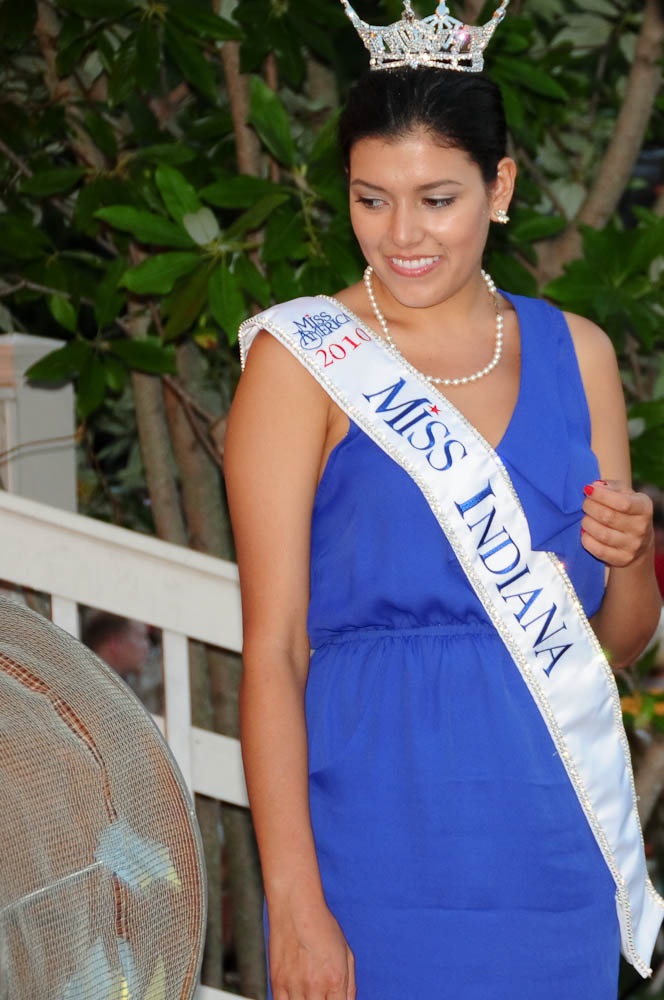
Gabrielle Reed,
Miss Indiana 2010

== Results summary ==
The following is a visual summary of the past results of Miss Indiana titleholders at the national Miss America pageants/competitions. The year in parentheses indicates the year of the national competition during which a placement and/or award was garnered, not the year attached to the contestant's state title.

=== Placements ===
- Miss Americas: Katie Stam (2009)
- 1st runners-up: Carol Mitchell (1952), Ann Garnier (1953), Barbara Mougin (1978), Nicole Rash (2008)
- 2nd runners-up: Eileen Smith (1966), Shelli Yoder (1993), Cydney Bridges (2024)
- 3rd runners-up: Pam Carlberg (1982)
- 4th runners-up: Tommye Glaze (1961), Kit Field (1969), Rebecca Graham (1973), Tiffany Storm (1995)
- Top 5: Anna Howe (1927)
- Top 7: Elizabeth Hallal (2023)
- Top 10: Mary Haglund (1968), Penny Tichenor (1975), Cyndi Legler (1976), Laurie Broderick (1986), Shani Nielsen (1997), Julianne Hackney (1999), Bryn Chapman (2004)
- Top 12: MerrieBeth Cox (2013)
- Top 15: Helen Emly (1938), Tangra Riggle (2003), Nicole Pollard (2010), Lydia Tremaine (2019)
- Top 20: Allison Hatcher (2002)

==== Preliminary awards ====
- Preliminary Lifestyle and Fitness: Anita Hursh (1959), Rebecca Graham (1973), Shelli Yoder (1993) (tie), Tiffany Storm (1995), Katie Stam (2009)
- Preliminary Talent: Gloria Rupprecht (1958), Tommye Glaze (1961), Eileen Smith (1966), Mary Haglund (1968), Laurie Broderick (1986), Shani Nielsen (1997), Tangra Riggle (2003), Lydia Tremaine (2019), Elizabeth Hallal (2023)

==== Non-finalist awards ====
- Non-finalist Talent: Kathleen Burke (1962), Pat Patterson (1972), Sheila Stephen (1988), Sarah Wiley (2005), Gabrielle Reed (2011), Audra Casterline (2015)

==== Other awards ====
- Miss Congeniality: Debbie May (1971), Cydney Bridges (2024)
- Albert A. Marks Jr. Interview Award: Kelly Lloyd (2000)
- Bernie Wayne Talent Award: Tiffany Storm (1995), Shani Nielsen (1997)
- Evening Dress Award: Thelma Blossom (1922)
- Intercity Roller Chair Parade Award: Thelma Blossom (1922)
- Neat as a Pin Award: Pat Patterson (1972) (tie)
- Professional Beauty Award Third Prize: Sydney Nelson (1922)
- Quality of Life Award Finalists: Betsy Uschkrat (2007), Katie Stam (2009)

== Winners ==
- Declared as winner
- Ended as a runner-up
- Ended as a finalist or semi-finalist

Year	Name	Hometown	Age	Local Title	Miss America Talent	Placement at Miss America	Special scholarships at Miss America	Notes
2026	Ellise Edwards	Corydon	22	Miss Harvest Homecoming	Lyrical Dance			
2025	Kinley Shoemaker	Franklin	20	Miss Metropolitan	Vocal			Previously Miss Indiana Teen USA 2023
2024	Kalyn Melham	Muncie	23	Miss Southern Heartland	Vocal, "Don't Forget Me"			
2023	Cydney Bridges	Fort Wayne	22	Miss Fort Wayne	Vocal, "I'll Be There"	2nd Runner-Up	Miss Congeniality	
2022	Elizabeth Hallal	Georgetown	21	Miss Southern Heartland	Musical Theater Vocal "Defying Gravity"	Top 7	Preliminary Talent Award	
2021	Braxton Hiser	Indianapolis	24	Miss West Central Indiana	Vocal			
2019–20	Tiarra Taylor	New Albany	21	Miss Indiana State University	Vocal			
2018	Lydia Tremaine	Kendallville	20	Miss Fort Wayne	Vocal, "That's Life"	Top 15	Preliminary Talent Award	Later 2nd runner-up at Miss Indiana USA 2021
2017	Haley Jordan Begay	Pittsboro	19	Miss Metropolitan	Vocal, "Hallelujah"			Later crowned Miss Indiana USA 2023
2016	Brianna DeCamp	Kendallville	22	Miss Limberlost	Tap Dance			Previously Miss Indiana's Outstanding Teen 2011
2015	Morgan Jackson	Charlestown	21	Miss Harvest Homecoming	Lyrical Ballet, "It Is Well with My Soul" by Bill Gaither			Daughter of Miss New Mexico 1984, Trina Collins Previously Miss Indiana's Outstanding Teen 2007; Top 10 at Miss America's Outstanding Teen 2008 pageant Contestant at National Sweetheart 2014 pageant
2014	Audra Casterline	Fishers	23	Miss Hoosier Heartland	Vocal, "Over the Rainbow"		Non-finalist Talent Award	Contestant at National Sweetheart 2012 pageant
2013	Terrin Thomas	Auburn	21	Miss Indiana University	Vocal, "I'm Afraid This Must Be Love"			Arrested and charged with public intoxication, disorderly conduct and resisting law enforcement in December 2014; Charges were dropped as of May 2015
2012	MerrieBeth Cox	Roselle, IL	22	Miss Duneland	Baton Twirling, "Sparkling Diamonds"	Top 12		Eligible as a student at Purdue University Previously Miss Illinois' Outstanding Teen 2007 Purdue University's 27th Golden Girl
2011	Jackie Jerlecki	Goshen	22	Miss Duneland	Vocal, "Take Me to the World" from Evening Primrose			
2010	Gabrielle Reed	Bloomington	22	Miss Southern Heartland	Vocal, "You'll Never Walk Alone" from Carousel		Non-finalist Talent Award	
2009	Nicole Pollard	Lafayette	23	Miss Duneland	Broadway Vocal, "And This Is My Beloved"	Top 15		Previously Indiana's Junior Miss 2004
2008	Megan Meadors	Auburn	22	Miss Pride of Indiana	Vocal	Did not compete; originally placed 6th in the pageant, later assumed the title after Stam won Miss America 2009		
2008	Megan Meadors	Auburn	22	Miss Pride of Indiana	Vocal			Contestant at National Sweetheart 2005 pageant Cheerleader for the Indianapolis Colts
2008	Katie Stam	Seymour	22	Miss Duneland	Vocal, "Via Dolorosa"	Winner	Preliminary Swimsuit Award Quality of Life Award Finalist	Received a "Golden Sash" and automatic Top 15 placement at Miss America 2009 pageant on Miss America: Countdown to the Crown
2007	Nicole Rash	Plymouth	23	Miss Ball State University	Vocal, "Bandito"	1st runner-up		Top 10 at National Sweetheart 2006 pageant Later Ms. Missouri 2012 and Ms. America 2012 Later Mrs. America 2018 (under married name, Nicole Cook); Top 6 at Mrs. World 2018 pageant
2006	Betsy Uschkrat	Bloomington	24	Miss Indiana University	Classical Vocal, "Quando me'n vo'"		Quality of Life Award Finalist	
2005	Susan Guilkey	Noblesville	22	Miss North Central	Vocal, "I, Don Quixote" from Man of La Mancha			Later married Indiana Lieutenant Governor Micah Beckwith
2004	Sarah Wiley	Carmel	24	Miss Wabash Valley	Vocal, "What Kind of Fool Am I?"		Non-finalist Talent Award	Top 10 (2002) and contestant (2003) at National Sweetheart pageants
2003	Bryn Chapman	Indianapolis	21	Miss South Central	Vocal, "Home" from Phantom	Top 10		3rd runner-up at National Sweetheart 2002 pageant as Miss Kentucky
2002	Tangra Riggle	West Lafayette	21	Miss North Central	Vocal, "God Bless America"	Top 15	Preliminary Talent Award	
2001	Allison Hatcher	Evansville	24	Miss North Central	Classical Piano, "Prelude in G Minor"	Top 20		
2000	Betsy Bobel	Peru	23	Miss Duneland	Gymnastics, "In the Mood"			Sister of Miss Indiana USA 2006, Bridget Bobel
1999	Kelly Lloyd	Indianapolis	22	Miss North Central	Jazz Dance, "Jump, Jive an' Wail"		Albert A. Marks Jr. Interview Award	Triple Crown Winner: Previously Miss Indiana Teen USA 1993 1st runner-up at Miss Teen USA 1993 pageant; Later Miss Indiana USA 2002 2nd runner-up at Miss USA 2002 pageant; 2nd runner-up at National Sweetheart 1998 pageant
1998	Julianne Hackney	Vincennes	20	Miss Northwest Territory	Vocal, "My Man"	Top 10		Top 10 at National Sweetheart 1997 pageant
1997	Sara Engerman	Kendallville	19	Miss Limberlost	Tap Dance, "Shout And Feel It"			
1996	Shani Nielsen	New Albany	24	Miss Harvest Homecoming	Vocal, "In His Eyes" from Jekyll & Hyde	Top 10	Bernie Wayne Talent Award Preliminary Talent Award	
1995	Becky Gray	Indianapolis	23	Miss North Central	Piano			
1994	Tiffany Storm	Bloomington	24	Miss Capital City	Dramatic Vocal, "Papa, Can You Hear Me?"	4th runner-up	Bernie Wayne Talent Award Preliminary Swimsuit Award	
1993	Dayna Brewer	New Albany	22	Miss Capital City	Vocal, "When I Look At You" from The Scarlet Pimpernel			
1992	Shelli Yoder	Shipshewana	24	Miss Elkhart	Vocal, "This Is the Moment"	2nd runner-up	Preliminary Swimsuit Award (tie)	Ran for United States House of Representatives as the Democratic candidate in 2012 and 2016
1991	Kari Hipsher	Wabash	23	Miss Huntington	Ballet en Pointe			
1990	Brenda Bassett	Kokomo	21	Miss Kokomo	Character Ballet en Pointe			
1989	Lisa Williamson	Terre Haute	26	Miss Hoosier Hills	Classical Vocal, "The Doll Song" from The Tales of Hoffmann			
1988	Joni McMechan	Liberty	21	Miss Central Indiana	Semi-classical Vocal Medley			
1987	Sheila Stephen	Unionville	23	Miss Hoosier Hills	Country Vocal, "Only You"		Non-finalist Talent Award	
1986	Susan Sailor	Elkhart	20	Miss Elkhart	Piano			
1985	Laurie Broderick	Elkhart	21	Miss Elkhart	Dance / Twirl	Top 10	Preliminary Talent Award	
1984	Cynthia Yantis	Fort Wayne	23	Miss Fort Wayne	Popular Vocal, "City Lights"			
1983	Teri Schultz	Bloomington	21	Miss Hoosier Hills	Ballet, "Sylvia"			
1982	Ilona Conway	Bunker Hill	25	Miss Hoosier Hills	Popular Vocal, "Mister Melody"			
1981	Pam Carlberg	Bourbon	21	Miss Plymouth	Accordion Medley, "Sabre Dance" & "Ritual Fire Dance"	3rd runner-up		
1980	Teresa (Teri) Karessa Kardatzke	Anderson	19	Miss Anderson	Semi-classical Vocal, "Twinkle, Twinkle, Little Star"			Teresa (Teri) Kardatzke Estes died in Benton, Kansas at age 62 on July 13, 2023.
1979	Rickee Farrell	Valparaiso	18	Miss North Central	Acrobatic Dance, "Sweet Charity"			
1978	Terry Kaiser	Etna Green	22	Miss Plymouth	Modern Dance, "Symphony No. 8" by Franz Schubert			
1977	Barbara Mougin	Bremen	24	Miss Plymouth	Modern Dance, "Theme from Summer of '42"	1st runner-up		
1976	Tamara Trittschuh	Plainfield	21	Miss Monroe County	Piano, "Rhapsodies, Op. 79" by Johannes Brahms			
1975	Cyndi Legler	Fort Wayne	21	Miss Mid-Central	Classical Ballet, "Dawn" from Coppélia	Top 10		Contestant at National Sweetheart 1974 pageant
1974	Penny Tichenor	Owensville	21	Miss Evansville Freedom Festival	Vocal, "Maybe This Time" from Cabaret	Top 10		
1973	Karen Rogers	Indianapolis	22	Miss Indiana Central College	Popular Vocal, "Put a Little Love in Your Heart"			
1972	Rebecca Graham	Indianapolis	23	Miss South Central	Gymnastics Dance	4th runner-up	Preliminary Swimsuit Award	
1971	Pat Patterson	Gary	22	Miss Gary	Vocal, "My Funny Valentine"		Special Talent Award Neat as a Pin Award (tie)	First African-American Miss Indiana Performed as a recording artist under the name "Kellee Patterson"
1970	Debbie May	Remington	21	Miss Indianapolis	Semi-classical Vocal, "The Impossible Dream"		Miss Congeniality	
1969	Jill Jackson	Anderson	18	Miss Anderson	Vocal / Dance, "Much More" from The Fantasticks			
1968	Kit Field	Indianapolis	21	Miss Indianapolis	Vocal, "Why Was I Born?"	4th runner-up		Featured performer on Miss America 1969 telecast
1967	Mary Haglund	Indianapolis / Janesville, Wisconsin	19	Miss Butler University	Figure Skating, "Swan Lake" & "The Shadow of Your Smile"	Top 10	Preliminary Talent Award	A Wisconsin native, Mary qualified by attending college studies at Butler University in Indianapolis.
1966	Jane Ann Rutledge	Vincennes	19	Miss Indiana University	Piano medley of works by George Gershwin			
1965	Eileen Smith	Indianapolis	18	Miss Indianapolis	Vocal Medley, "The Sound of Music" & "Climb Ev'ry Mountain"	2nd runner-up	Preliminary Talent Award	
1964	Sandra Miller	Bedford	20	Miss Bedford	Popular Vocal			
1963	Marsha Pinkstaff	Crawfordsville		Miss Butler University	Dramatic Reading			
1962	Julia Flaningan	Lebanon	20	Miss Butler University	Popular Vocal			
1961	Kathleen Burke	Terre Haute	18	Miss Indiana State Teachers College	Musical Monologue & Fashion Show		Non-finalist Talent Award	
1960	Tommye Glaze	Culver	21	Miss Plymouth	Classical Vocal, "Una Voce Poco Fa" from The Barber of Seville	4th runner-up	Preliminary Talent Award	
1959	Barbara Jean Kummer	Valparaiso	20	Miss Valparaiso University	Impersonations of Television Personalities			
1958	Anita Hursh	Goshen		Miss Goshen	Piano, "Polonaise" by Frédéric Chopin		Preliminary Swimsuit Award	
1957	Gloria Rupprecht	Valparaiso		Miss Valparaiso University	Vocal / Comedy Skit, "My Hero"		Preliminary Talent Award	
1956	Mary McNulty	Fort Wayne	22	Miss Fort Wayne	Soft Shoe Dance, "Singin' in the Rain"			
1955	Carolyn Turner	Indianapolis		Miss Indianapolis	Chalk Talk & Poetry			
1954	Sue Eaton	Monticello		Miss Indianapolis	Art/Photo Display & Hula			
1953	Violet Wratich	East Chicago		Miss East Chicago	Vocal			
1952	Ann Garnier	Indianapolis		Miss Indianapolis	Classical Vocal, "Il Bacio" by Luigi Arditi	1st runner-up		
1951	Carol Mitchell	Rochester		Miss Rochester	Chalk Talk & Marionette Exhibition	1st runner-up		Carol Mitchell Popp Bennett died at age 96 on June 27, 2026, in Fort Wayne, Indiana.
1950	Pat Berry	Indianapolis		Miss Monticello	Vocal, "I'm Falling In Love With Someone" from Naughty Marietta			
1949	Patricia Lee Cunningham	Peru		Miss Monticello	Water Ballet			Originally finished as the 1st runner-up but assumed the title when Suter was disqualified
1949	Fay Louise Suter	Fort Wayne	18	Miss Fort Wayne	Baton Twirling	N/A		Disqualified for having competed in two local pageants that same year
1948	Patti Grubbs	Gary			Vocal, "When You Are Away"			
1947	Beverly Dawn Trenary	Gary	18		Vocal, "I'll Close My Eyes"			
1946	Lois Chitwood	Helmsburg		Miss Indiana University	Piano & Speech			
1945	Betty Lockyear	Evansville			Vocal, "Indian Love Call"			
1944	No Indiana representative at Miss America pageant							
1943	No Indiana representative at Miss America pageant							
1942	No Indiana representative at Miss America pageant							
1941	Alice Ullery	Evansville			Modeling			
1940	Carolyn Akin	Evansville			Tap Dance			
1939	No Indiana representative at Miss America pageant							
1938	Rosemary White			Miss Indianapolis				Multiple Indiana representatives Contestants competed under local title at Miss America pageant
1938	Helen Emly	Letts		Miss Letts		Top 15		Multiple Indiana representatives Contestants competed under local title at Miss America pageant
1937	No Indiana representative at Miss America pageant							
1936	No Indiana representative at Miss America pageant							
1935	No Indiana representative at Miss America pageant							
1934	No national pageant was held							
1933	Mary Frances Lininger				N/A	N/A		Chose to get married and thus did not compete at Miss America 1933 pageant
1932	No national pageants were held							
1931	No national pageants were held							
1930	No national pageants were held							
1929	No national pageants were held							
1928	No national pageants were held							
1927	Anna May Owens	Gary		Miss Gary	N/A			Multiple Indiana representatives Contestants competed under local title at Miss America pageant
1927	Anna Howe			Miss Hammond	N/A	Top 5		Multiple Indiana representatives Contestants competed under local title at Miss America pageant
1927	Hilda Koch	South Bend		Miss South Bend	N/A			Multiple Indiana representatives Contestants competed under local title at Miss America pageant
1927	Vera Haspal			Miss Terre Haute	N/A			Multiple Indiana representatives Contestants competed under local title at Miss America pageant
1926	Wanda Marie Sobczak	Michigan City	20		N/A			Won the inaugural Miss Indiana pageant that took place at Gay Mills Ballroom in Miller, Indiana
1925	No Indiana representative at Miss America pageant							
1924	No Indiana representative at Miss America pageant							
1923	No Indiana representative at Miss America pageant							
1922	Sydney Nelson	Indianapolis			N/A		Professional Beauty Award Third Prize	Nelson lived and worked in New York City at time of pageant but cited as being from Indianapolis (therefore credited as a "Miss Indiana" titleholder). Appeared in the Broadway productions of The Passing Show of 1922 and The Whirl of New York
1922	Thelma Blossom	Indianapolis	20	Miss Indianapolis	N/A		Evening Dress Award Intercity Roller Chair Parade Award	Competed as Miss Indianapolis at Miss America pageant
1921	No Indiana representative at Miss America pageant							
