= Clark C. Fowler House =

Historic house in Kentucky, United States

- U.S. National Register of Historic Places
- Nearest city: Tompkinsville, Kentucky
- Coordinates: 36°38′38″N 85°29′09″W
- Area: less than one acre
- Built: 1880
- Architectural style: I-house
- MPS: Monroe County, Kentucky MPS
- NRHP reference No.: 01000794
- Added to NRHP: August 2, 2001

The Clark C. Fowler House near Tompkinsville, Kentucky is an I-house which was built in 1880. It was listed on the National Register of Historic Places in 2001.

It is a two-story frame, central passage plan structure, with Queen Anne influence in details of dormers and its rear porch. It was built to serve as a boardinghouse and is on a hillside overlooking the Cumberland River. It is the only surviving dwelling in the riverside community of Martinsburg.
