= Cumming Bandstand =

- U.S. National Register of Historic Places
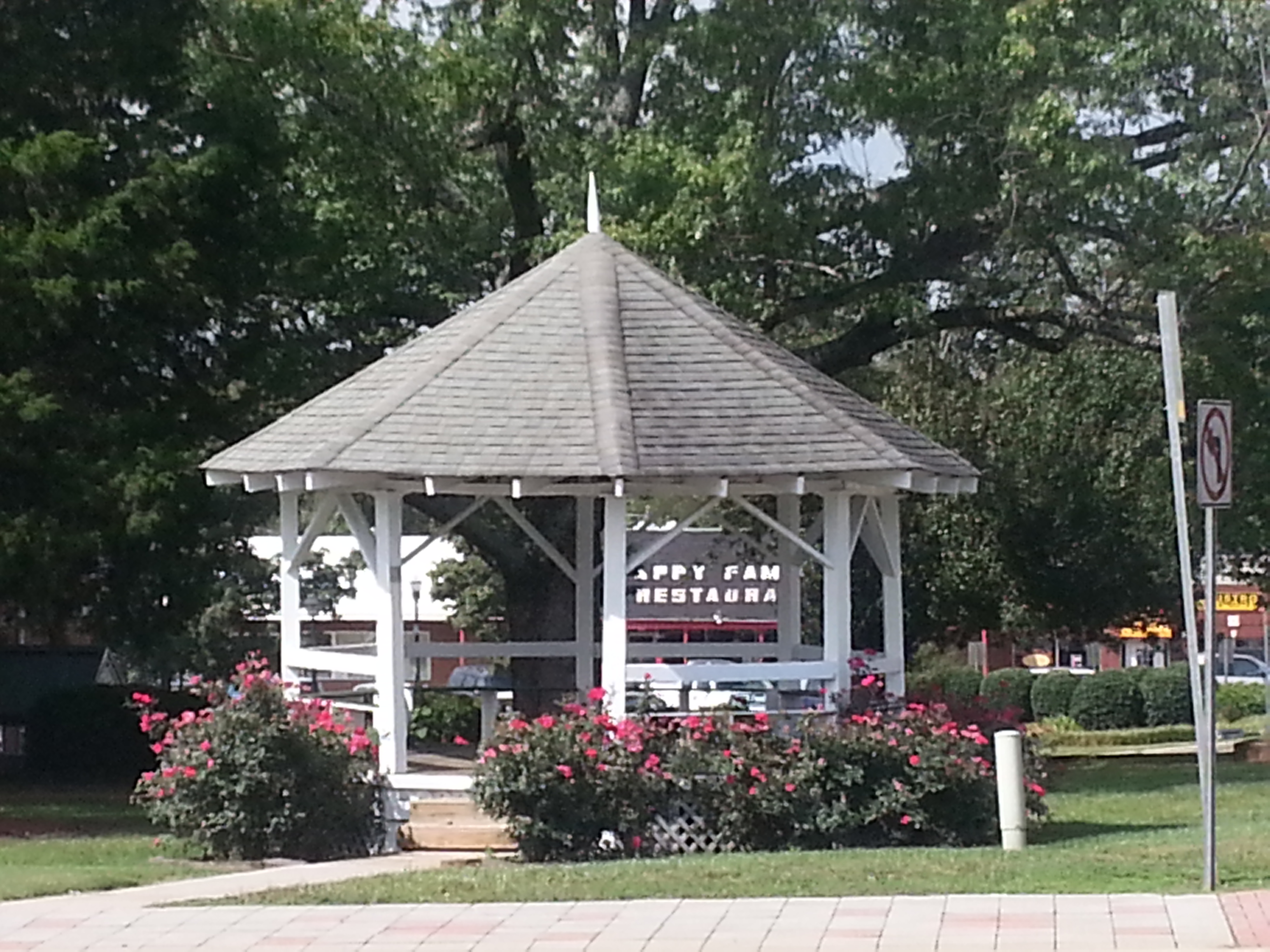

- Location within Georgia
- Location: Jct. of Main and Dahlonega Sts., Georgia
- Coordinates: 34°12′24″N 84°08′22″W
- Area: 0.3 acres (0.12 ha)
- Built: 1915
- Built by: Robbs, John Robbs, contractor
- Architectural style: Bandstand
- NRHP reference No.: 02000658
- Added to NRHP: June 20, 2002

The Cumming Bandstand, in front of the Forsyth County Courthouse in Cumming, Georgia, was built in 1915. It was listed on the National Register of Historic Places in 2002.

It is located at the junction of Court Square North (Main St.) and Court Square East (Dahlonega St.) in Cumming.

It was deemed "significant as one of a very small number of extant historic bandstands on county courthouse squares in Georgia. Although other historic bandstands exist in city parks and on current and former military bases, relatively few were ever built and very few remain on county courthouse squares. Only two are currently listed in the National Register-both are included in historic downtown districts (in Bainbridge, Decatur County, and Sandersville, Washington County)—and no other National Register-eligible bandstands on county courthouse squares are known to exist at this time."

"Deemed significant as one of a very small number of extant historic bandstands on county courthouse squares in Georgia. Although other historic bandstands exist in city parks and on current and former military bases, relatively few were ever built and very few remain on county courthouse squares. Only two are currently listed in the National Register-both are included in historic downtown districts (in Bainbridge, Decatur County, and Sandersville, Washington County)—and no other National Register-eligible bandstands on county courthouse squares are known to exist at this time."
