= County Road 17 (Elkhart County, Indiana) =

Highway in Elkhart County, Indiana, US

County Road 17
- Michiana Parkway
- CR 17 highlighted in red

Route information
- Maintained by Elkhart County Highway Department
- Length: 23.08 mi (37.14 km)

Major junctions
- South end: Kosciusko CR 200
- US 6; SR 119; US 33 near Dunlap; US 20 at Elkhart; SR 120 at Elkhart; I-80 / I-90 / Indiana Toll Road at Elkhart
- North end: M-217 at Michigan state line

Location
- Country: United States
- State: Indiana
- County: Elkhart

Highway system
- Elkhart County Roads

County Road 17 (CR 17) is a 23.08-mile-long (37.14 km) north–south county highway in Elkhart County, Indiana. It is currently undergoing improvements to become a four-lane divided road with non-limited traffic. CR 17 begins at the state line, connecting with state highway M-217 in Michigan. The roadway enters Indiana and becomes CR 17. Currently the improved section of CR 17 ends between CR 40 and CR 38 (CR 17 continues south in its original configuration, as part of Elkhart County's grid-numbered county road system, becoming North County Road 200 West at the Kosciusko County line).

== Route description ==
CR 17 southern terminus is at the Kosciusko-Elkhart county line. From the southern terminus CR 17 heads due north, 1.0 mile (1.6 km) north of the southern terminus is US Highway 6 (US 6). Then 7.1 miles (11.4 km) north of US 6, CR 17 meets CR 40. North of CR 40, the road becomes a four-lane divided highway before CR 38. At CR 38, the route has a traffic light and curves to the northwest, followed by a traffic light at State Road 119 (SR 119). North of SR 119, the route curves due north and becomes limited accesses passing over CR 32 and CR 30. The highway has a traffic light at CR 28, CR 28 links CR 17 and US 33. After CR 28 is a traffic light with Rieth Boulevard, which also provides access to US 33. North of CR 28, the route passes over US 33 and the Norfolk Southern Railroad tracks. After the bridge is a traffic light with an access road to CR 45, followed by a bridge over CR 45 and the Elkhart River. After the river the road passes under CR 26. East of Elkhart CR 17 has an interchange with US 20 and an intersection with SR 120. Then in northeast Elkhart, CR 17 has an interchange with I-80/I-90 (Indiana Toll Road). The portion of CR 17 north of the Indiana Toll Road, along with M-217, is known as the Michiana Parkway. The northern terminus is north of the Indiana Toll Road at the Michigan State Line.

== History ==
The planning for CR 17 goes back to the 1960s when the state of Indiana planned a bypass of US 33 around the southwest side of Goshen; this project was never built. In the 1980s, a plan to connect the Indiana Toll Road with the east side of Elkhart was proposed. The project involved replacing some of Elkhart County Road 6. When the project on CR 6 was completed, a need for a north–south corridor in Elkhart County became a problem. Elkhart County chose Elkhart County Road 17 to be the north–south corridor. The first section opened in the 1990s near the Michigan state line, while the section near US 33 opened in 2005. The stretch of road connecting these areas was then completed in sections. In October 2012, the new four-lane divided highway opened to traffic from just north of CR 40 to CR 28. The old two-lane highway between CR 38 and CR 18 is now known as Old CR 17.

The portion of CR 17 between US 20 and the Indiana Toll Road (I-80/I-90) was in the past part of the National Highway System, the only county highway in Indiana on the system.

== Future ==
The plans are to continue the upgrade of CR 17 south to US 6.

== Major intersections ==
The entire route is in Elkhart County.

Location	mi	km	Destinations	Notes
Union–Jackson township line	0.00	0.00	Kosciusko CR 200 West	Southern terminus of CR 17
Union–Jackson township line	0.99	1.59	US 6 – Nappanee, Ligonier	
Harrison–Elkhart township line	7.01	11.28	CR 40 – Waterford Mills, Wakarusa	
Harrison–Elkhart township line	7.68	12.36	South end of divided highway	
Harrison–Elkhart township line	8.02	12.91	CR 38 – Goshen, Wakarusa	No trucks allow eastbound
Harrison–Elkhart township line	8.89	14.31	SR 119 – Wakarusa, Nappanee, Goshen	
Harrison–Elkhart– Concord–Jefferson township quadripoint	12.04	19.38	CR 28 to US 33 – Goshen, Dunlap, Elkhart	
Concord Township	12.30	19.79	To US 33 / Rieth Boulevard – Dunlap	
Concord–Jefferson township line	12.60	20.28	CR 45 / Lincoln Highway – Goshen, Elkhart	
Concord–Jefferson township line	14.29	23.00	CR 20	
Concord–Jefferson township line	15.81	25.44	CR 18 – Elkhart	
Concord–Jefferson township line	16.21– 16.43	26.09– 26.44	US 20 (St. Joseph Valley Parkway) – Elkhart	Interchange
Concord–Jefferson township line	16.63	26.76	North end of divided highway	
Concord–Jefferson township line	18.76	30.19	SR 120 – Elkhart, Bristol	
Osolo–Washington township line	21.30	34.28	I-80 Toll / I-90 Toll / Indiana Toll Road	Indiana Toll Road Exit 96
Washington Township	23.08	37.14	M-217 north	Northern terminus at state line
1.000 mi = 1.609 km; 1.000 km = 0.621 mi
