= Elkhart County, Indiana =

County in Indiana, United States

- County
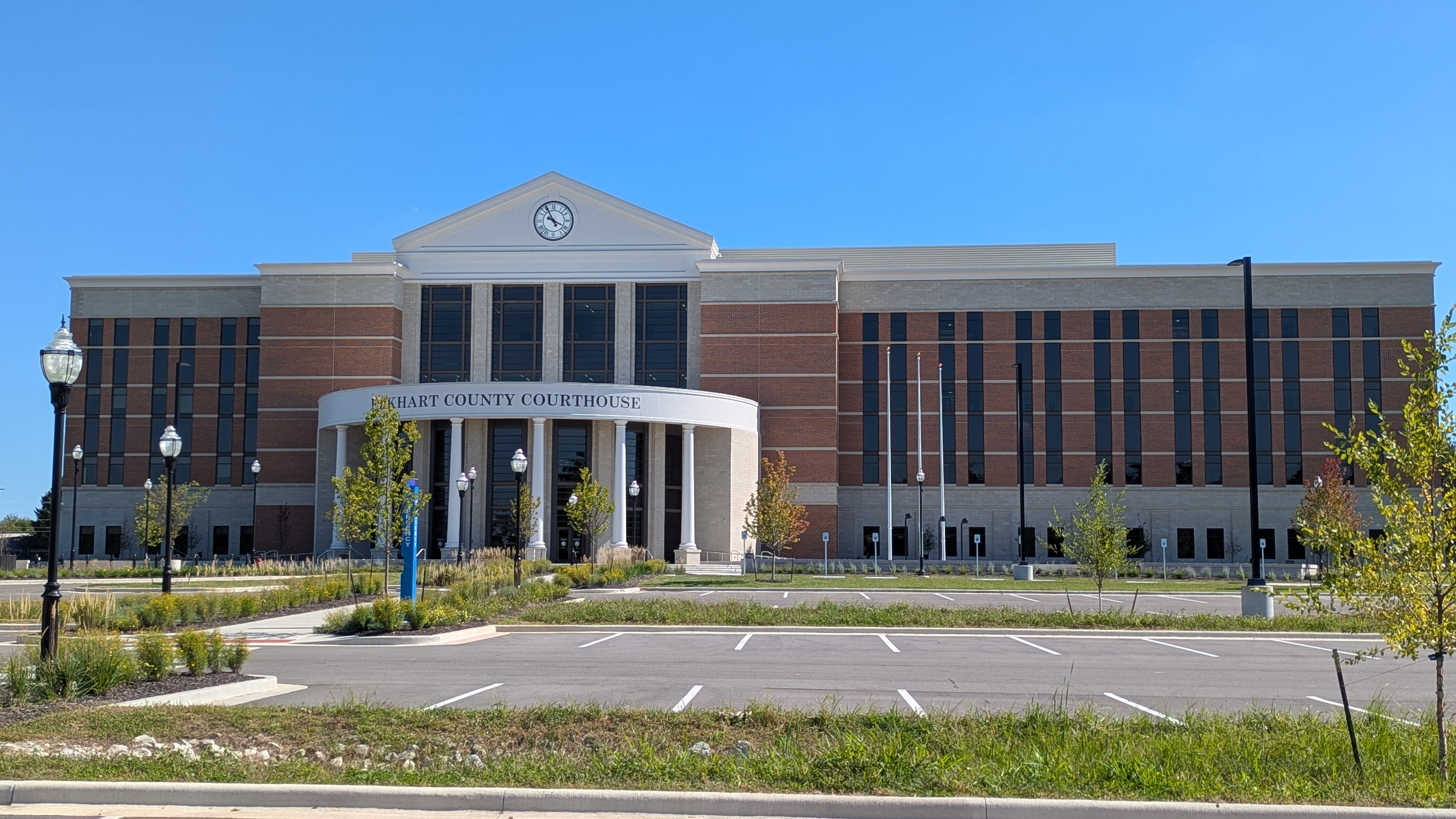
- Elkhart County Courthouse in Goshen, Indiana

- Flag

- Location within the U.S. state of Indiana
- Coordinates: 41°36′N 85°52′W
- Country: United States
- State: Indiana
- Founded: April 1, 1830
- Seat: Goshen
- Largest city: Elkhart

Area
  - Total: 467.97 sq mi (1,212.0 km^{2})
  - Land: 463.17 sq mi (1,199.6 km^{2})
  - Water: 4.80 sq mi (12.4 km^{2}) 1.03%

Population (2020)
  - Total: 207,047
  - Estimate (2025): 208,774 ▲
  - Density: 450/sq mi (170/km^{2})
- Time zone: UTC−5 (Eastern)
  - Summer (DST): UTC−4 (EDT)
- Congressional district: 2nd
- Website: elkhartcounty.com/en/
- Indiana county number 20

Elkhart County is a county located in the U.S. state of Indiana. As of 2020, the county's population was 207,047. The county seat is Goshen. Elkhart County is part of the Elkhart-Goshen Metropolitan Statistical Area, which in turn is part of the South Bend-Elkhart-Mishawaka Combined Statistical Area. It is also considered part of the broader region of Northern Indiana known as Michiana, and is 20 miles (32 km) east of South Bend, Indiana, 110 miles (180 km) east of Chicago, Illinois, and 150 miles (240 km) north of Indianapolis, Indiana. The area is referred to by locals as the recreation vehicle (RV) capital of the world and is known for its sizable Amish and Old Order Mennonite population.

== History ==
At the beginning of the nineteenth century, the area now within Elkhart County boundaries was mainly inhabited by the Potawatomi tribe. Pioneers began settling in the Elkhart Prairie in 1829 and in April 1830, Elkhart County was officially established with its original county seat in Dunlap. After reorganizing the county borders, the seat was moved to Goshen near the county's geographical center.

Elkhart County was founded by immigrants from New England. These were old-stock "Yankee" immigrants, descended from the English Puritans who settled New England in the 1600s. The completion of the Erie Canal in 1821 sparked a surge in immigration from New England to northern Indiana, which had become a state five years earlier. The end of the Black Hawk War in 1832 increased the immigration surge of immigration, again coming from New England as a result of overpopulation combined with land shortages in that region. Some of these later settlers were from upstate New York, whose relatives had moved to that region from New England shortly after the American Revolutionary War. New Englanders and New England transplants from upstate New York were the vast majority of Elkhart County's inhabitants during the first several decades of its history. These settlers were primarily members of the Congregational Church though due to the Second Great Awakening many of them had converted to Methodism and some had become Baptists before moving west. The Congregational Church subsequently has gone through many divisions, and some factions, including those in Elkhart County, are now known as the Church of Christ and the United Church of Christ. As a result of this heritage, most of Elkhart County supported the abolitionist movement before the American Civil War. Elkhart County provided substantial recruits for the Union Army. During the end of the nineteenth century, Irish and German migrants came to Elkhart County, although most did not come directly from Europe, but had stopped in other areas in the Midwest, such as Ohio.

=== Name ===
The name Elkhart is a euphemization of "Elks-heart", which refers to the now extinct Eastern elk. The name has been attached to the Elkhart River and surrounding area since at least 1749, when it was recorded in French as Coeur de cerf ("elk's heart") as the name of a Miami village there. The place name in Miami-Illinois is mihšiiwiateehi ("elk's heart"). Later in the 18th century the area was inhabited by the Potawatomi; in the Potawatomi language, the place is likewise known as mzewəodeʔig, "at the elk heart". The name may reflect a prehistoric association of the Elkhart area with the Kaskaskia people, whom the Miami called "elk hearts".

Other explanations have been suggested. According to an account by two Miami leaders (Jean Baptiste Richardville and Le Gros) recorded in 1824, the name arose from two women fighting over an elk's heart that had been hung up to dry. Alternatively, some historians including Jacob Piatt Dunn have associated the name with the shape of an island in the Elkhart River that is stated to resemble an elk's heart. This theory has been carried on the city's website.

A popular but non-historical account claims that the county was named after a Shawnee Indian chief named "Elkhart", who was ostensibly a cousin of the famous Chief Tecumseh, and father of "princess Mishawaka" (for whom, according to the story, neighboring Mishawaka is named). This story originated in Legends of Michigan and the Old North West, an 1875 collection of historical fiction by Michigan politician Flavius J. Littlejohn.

== Geography ==
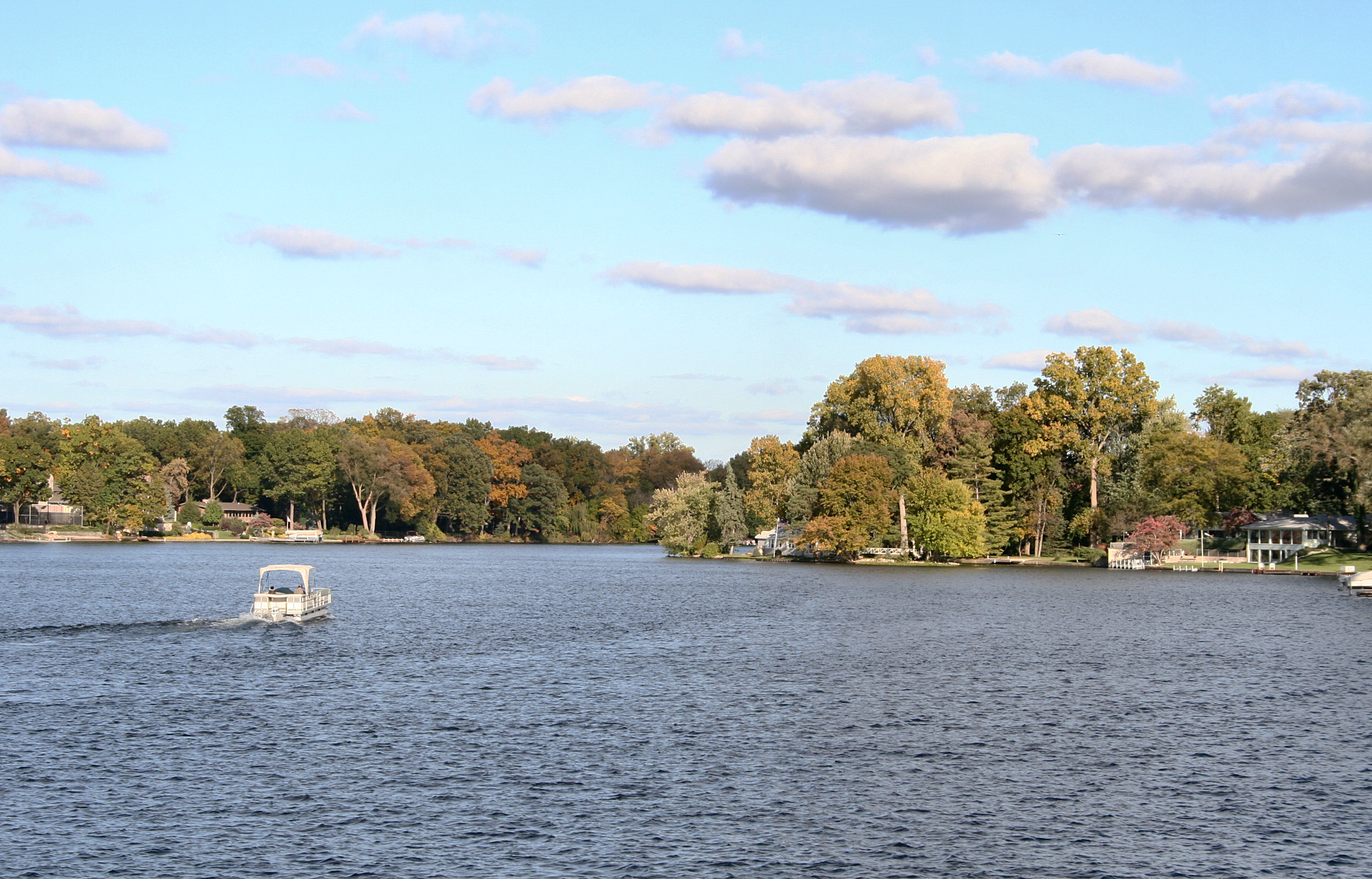
The St. Joseph River widens as it flows west through Elkhart.

According to the 2010 census, the county has a total area of 467.97 square miles (1,212.0 km^{2}), of which 463.17 square miles (1,199.6 km^{2}) (or 98.97%) is land and 4.80 square miles (12.4 km^{2}) (or 1.03%) is water. The county sits in mostly rural farmland with rolling hills in its northeast corner. Those hills were formed by glaciers and are part of the St. Lawrence Seaway Continental Divide.

The St. Joseph River, which flows from Michigan, across the Michigan border north of Bristol, is the main waterway in Elkhart County. The Elkhart River enters the county east of Millersburg and winds its way through Goshen and Dunlap to Island Park in Elkhart where it meets the St. Joseph. The Little Elkhart River flows into the county southeast of Middlebury and creates some scenic views in Bonneyville Mills County Park before emptying into the St. Joseph near Bristol. Numerous creeks wind their way through the countryside and several lakes, including Simonton Lake, dot the landscape.

Fifteen unincorporated communities also exist in the county. They are Benton, Bonneyville Mills, Dunlap, Foraker, Garden Village, Jimtown, Locke, Midway, New Paris, Nibbyville, Simonton Lake, Southwest, Vistula, and Waterford Mills.

=== Adjacent counties ===
- Cass County, Michigan (northwest)
- St. Joseph County, Michigan (northeast)
- LaGrange County (east)
- Noble County (southeast)
- Kosciusko County (south)
- Marshall County (southwest)
- St. Joseph County (west)

Elkhart County is one of the few counties in the US to border two counties of the same name in different states (St. Joseph County in Indiana and Michigan).

== Communities ==

=== Cities ===
- Elkhart
- Goshen
- Nappanee

=== Towns ===
- Bristol
- Middlebury
- Millersburg
- Wakarusa

=== Townships ===
- Baugo
- Benton
- Cleveland
- Clinton
- Concord
- Elkhart
- Harrison
- Jackson
- Jefferson
- Locke
- Middlebury
- Olive
- Osolo
- Union
- Washington
- York

=== Census-designated places ===
- Dunlap
- New Paris
- Simonton Lake

=== Other unincorporated communities ===
- Benton
- Bonneyville Mills
- Foraker
- Jimtown
- Locke
- New Paris
- Southwest
- Vistula
- Waterford Mills

== Economy ==
Goshen, Indiana

Climate chart (precipitation, max. and min. temperature)
J	F	M	A	M	J	J	A	S	O	N	D
1.8 31 17	1.8 36 20	2.7 48 29	3.4 61 39	3.4 73 49	4.1 81 59	3.5 85 63	4 82 61	3.6 76 54	2.9 64 43	2.8 50 34	2.7 36 23
- █ Average max. and min. temperatures in °F
- █ Precipitation totals in inches
- Source: The Weather Channel
Metric conversion
J	F	M	A	M	J	J	A	S	O	N	D
47 −1 −8	45 2 −7	69 9 −2	86 16 4	86 23 9	103 27 15	89 29 17	101 28 16	91 24 12	73 18 6	72 10 1	68 2 −5
- █ Average max. and min. temperatures in °C
- █ Precipitation totals in mm

Elkhart County is known as "The RV Capital of the World" because of its substantial recreational vehicle-based economy. Farming also plays a big role in the local economy. Tourism boosts the county's economy. Destinations such as Das Dutchman Essenhaus in Middlebury and Amish Acres in Nappanee along with annual events such as the Elkhart Jazz Festival, the Amish Acres Arts & Crafts Festival, and the Elkhart County 4-H Fair draw thousands of tourists annually. The Fair is the second-largest county fair in the United States.

== Climate and weather ==
In recent years, average temperatures in Goshen have ranged from a low of 17 °F (−8 °C) in January to a high of 85 °F (29 °C) in July, although a record low of −24 °F (−31 °C) was recorded in January 1984 and a record high of 102 °F (39 °C) was recorded in June 1988. Average monthly precipitation ranged from 1.77 inches (45 mm) in February to 4.05 inches (103 mm) in June.

== Demographics ==
Historical population
Census	Pop.	Note	%±
1830	935		—
1840	6,660		612.3%
1850	12,690		90.5%
1860	20,986		65.4%
1870	26,026		24.0%
1880	33,454		28.5%
1890	39,201		17.2%
1900	45,052		14.9%
1910	49,008		8.8%
1920	56,384		15.1%
1930	68,875		22.2%
1940	72,634		5.5%
1950	84,512		16.4%
1960	106,790		26.4%
1970	126,529		18.5%
1980	137,330		8.5%
1990	156,198		13.7%
2000	182,791		17.0%
2010	197,559		8.1%
2020	207,047		4.8%
2025 (est.)	208,774	▲	0.8%
1830 Census. Elkhart County. 1840 Census. Elkhart County. U.S. Decennial Censuses: 1790-1960 1900-90; 1990-2000, 2010 2020 2025

=== Racial and ethnic composition ===
Elkhart County, Indiana – Racial and ethnic composition Note: the US Census treats Hispanic/Latino as an ethnic category. This table excludes Latinos from the racial categories and assigns them to a separate category. Hispanics/Latinos may be of any race.
Race / Ethnicity (NH = Non-Hispanic)	Pop 1980	Pop 1990	Pop 2000	Pop 2010	Pop 2020	% 1980	% 1990	% 2000	% 2010	% 2020
White alone (NH)	128,878	144,701	152,421	152,555	145,039	93.85%	92.64%	83.39%	77.22%	70.05%
Black or African American alone (NH)	5,730	7,046	9,390	10,989	11,051	4.17%	4.51%	5.14%	5.56%	5.34%
Native American or Alaska Native alone (NH)	256	424	400	434	373	0.19%	0.27%	0.22%	0.22%	0.18%
Asian alone (NH)	491	981	1,652	1,879	2,236	0.36%	0.63%	0.90%	0.95%	1.08%
Native Hawaiian or Pacific Islander alone (NH)	x	x	58	60	54	x	x	0.03%	0.03%	0.03%
Other race alone (NH)	256	114	206	283	716	0.19%	0.07%	0.11%	0.14%	0.35%
Mixed race or Multiracial (NH)	x	x	2,364	3,473	7,984	x	x	1.29%	1.76%	3.86%
Hispanic or Latino (any race)	1,719	2,932	16,300	27,886	39,594	1.25%	1.88%	8.92%	14.12%	19.12%
Total	137,330	156,198	182,791	197,559	207,047	100.00%	100.00%	100.00%	100.00%	100.00%

=== 2020 census ===
As of the 2020 census, the county had a population of 207,047. The median age was 35.7 years. 27.3% of residents were under the age of 18 and 15.1% of residents were 65 years of age or older. For every 100 females there were 97.6 males, and for every 100 females age 18 and over there were 95.2 males age 18 and over.

The racial makeup of the county was 73.2% White, 5.5% Black or African American, 0.7% American Indian and Alaska Native, 1.1% Asian, <0.1% Native Hawaiian and Pacific Islander, 10.6% from some other race, and 8.9% from two or more races. Hispanic or Latino residents of any race comprised 19.1% of the population.

76.7% of residents lived in urban areas, while 23.3% lived in rural areas.

There were 74,631 households in the county, of which 35.7% had children under the age of 18 living in them. Of all households, 51.2% were married-couple households, 17.0% were households with a male householder and no spouse or partner present, and 24.1% were households with a female householder and no spouse or partner present. About 23.9% of all households were made up of individuals and 10.4% had someone living alone who was 65 years of age or older.

There were 79,594 housing units, of which 6.2% were vacant. Among occupied housing units, 69.2% were owner-occupied and 30.8% were renter-occupied. The homeowner vacancy rate was 1.2% and the rental vacancy rate was 8.6%.

=== 2010 census ===
As of the 2010 United States census, there were 197,559 people, 70,244 households, and 50,542 families residing in the county. The population density was 426.5 inhabitants per square mile (164.7/km^{2}). There were 77,767 housing units at an average density of 167.9 per square mile (64.8/km^{2}). The racial makeup of the county was 82.9% white, 5.7% black or African American, 1.0% Asian, 0.4% American Indian, 7.5% from other races, and 2.5% from two or more races. Those of Hispanic or Latino origin made up 14.1% of the population. In terms of ancestry, 28.4% were German, 10.2% were Irish, 7.6% were English, and 7.6% were American.

Of the 70,244 households, 38.1% had children under 18 living with them, 53.9% were married couples living together, 12.6% had a female householder with no husband present, 28.0% were non-families, and 22.7% of all households were made up of individuals. The average household size was 2.76, and the average family size was 3.23. The median age was 34.9 years.

The median income for a household in the county was $47,697, and the median income for a family was $53,742. Males had a median income of $41,891 versus $29,496 for females. The per capita income for the county was $22,187. About 10.2% of families and 13.7% of the population were below the poverty line, including 21.5% of those under age 18 and 8.5% of those age 65 or over.

== Amish and Mennonite communities ==
In 2020, the Amish and Mennonite population was 11,006 or 5.3% of the total population.

== Government ==
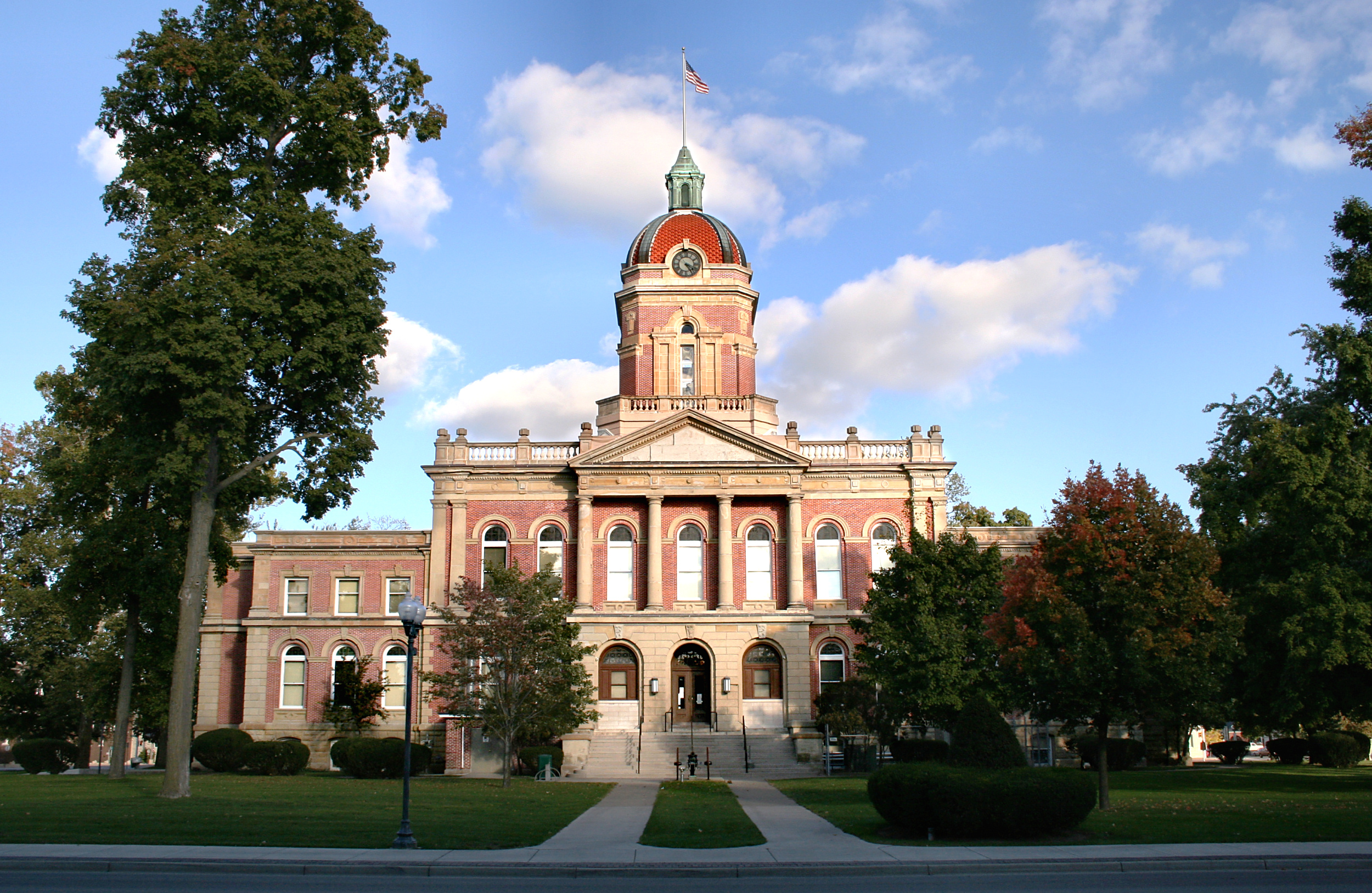
Former Elkhart County Courthouse

The county is led by a board of three elected commissioners that serve as the executive branch of county government. The board also serves as the legislative branch in that it is responsible for ordinances. The county council is made of seven elected members - one from each of the four council districts and three at large. The council is in charge of all monetary issues including appropriations and taxes. There are Township Assessors for Baugo, Cleveland, Concord, Elkhart, Middlebury, and Osolo townships and a County Assessor to handle the remaining townships.

Elkhart County is part of Indiana's 2nd congressional district; Indiana Senate districts 9, 11, and 12; and Indiana House of Representatives districts 21, 22, 48, 49, and 82.

Elkhart County has consistently been a Republican Party stronghold in presidential elections. It is very conservative for an urban county; the GOP has carried it all but three times since that party's first election in 1856. Franklin Roosevelt in 1932 and Lyndon Johnson in 1964 are the only Democrats to win it in the 20th century, both in national landslides that saw the Democrats win over 400 electoral votes. Obama's win in 2008 is the only occasion since 1968 that a Democrat has won 40 percent of the county's vote.

United States presidential election results for Elkhart County, Indiana
Year	Republican		Democratic		Third party(ies)	
Year	No.	%	No.	%	No.	%
1888	4,955	50.62%	4,464	45.61%	369	3.77%
1892	3,873	48.87%	3,530	44.54%	522	6.59%
1896	6,150	54.08%	4,986	43.85%	235	2.07%
1900	6,270	52.86%	4,950	41.73%	642	5.41%
1904	6,548	55.32%	4,023	33.99%	1,266	10.70%
1908	6,245	48.19%	5,697	43.96%	1,017	7.85%
1912	1,199	10.38%	4,300	37.22%	6,054	52.40%
1916	5,850	45.21%	5,723	44.22%	1,368	10.57%
1920	12,297	60.10%	5,770	28.20%	2,394	11.70%
1924	13,096	64.50%	4,729	23.29%	2,479	12.21%
1928	20,876	74.76%	6,900	24.71%	148	0.53%
1932	13,826	46.76%	14,885	50.34%	855	2.89%
1936	14,896	49.05%	14,473	47.65%	1,002	3.30%
1940	19,735	58.53%	13,620	40.40%	361	1.07%
1944	20,659	60.39%	12,991	37.98%	558	1.63%
1948	18,999	56.68%	13,703	40.88%	815	2.43%
1952	25,277	66.33%	12,002	31.49%	829	2.18%
1956	28,088	69.05%	12,363	30.39%	226	0.56%
1960	28,056	62.77%	16,264	36.39%	373	0.83%
1964	19,870	47.41%	21,679	51.72%	365	0.87%
1968	24,484	57.90%	14,222	33.63%	3,583	8.47%
1972	31,009	70.57%	12,659	28.81%	273	0.62%
1976	27,291	60.07%	17,581	38.70%	557	1.23%
1980	30,081	61.40%	14,883	30.38%	4,030	8.23%
1984	34,621	71.98%	13,240	27.53%	236	0.49%
1988	33,793	70.11%	14,236	29.54%	171	0.35%
1992	27,920	53.50%	14,660	28.09%	9,604	18.40%
1996	28,770	56.58%	16,598	32.64%	5,482	10.78%
2000	36,756	67.46%	16,402	30.11%	1,324	2.43%
2004	42,967	70.00%	17,966	29.27%	447	0.73%
2008	39,396	55.00%	31,398	43.83%	840	1.17%
2012	42,378	62.29%	24,399	35.87%	1,252	1.84%
2016	41,867	63.21%	20,740	31.31%	3,629	5.48%
2020	46,972	62.95%	26,108	34.99%	1,538	2.06%
2024	45,652	65.13%	23,082	32.93%	1,359	1.94%

== Transportation ==
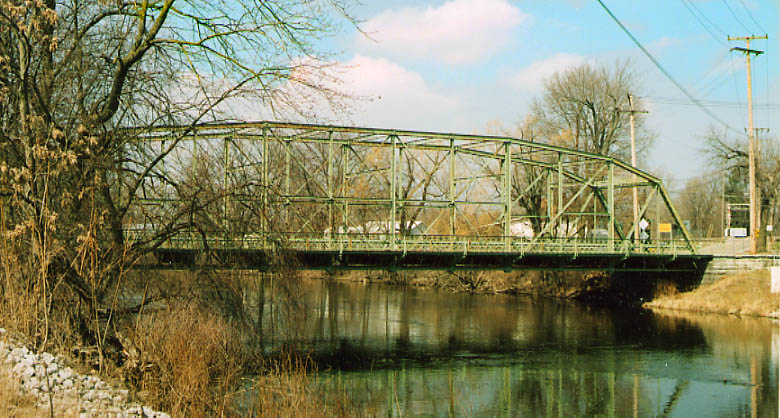
The Indiana Avenue Bridge over the Elkhart River on Goshen's north side

=== Roads ===
The Indiana Toll Road (Interstates 80/90) runs through the northern fringes of the county. Elkhart has two interchanges (exits 92 & 96) while Bristol (exit 101) and Middlebury (exit 107) have one apiece. U.S. Route 20 skirts the southern edges of Elkhart as the St. Joseph Valley Parkway until the freeway ends at the County Road 17 interchange. U.S. 20 continues eastward as a regular surface highway. County Road 17 is known as the "Michiana Parkway" and provides a connection between Goshen, U.S. 20, S.R. 120, the Elkhart East interchange (Exit 96) on the Toll Road, and US 12 in Michigan via M-217.

U.S. Highways 6, 33, and 131 also run through the county along with Indiana State Highways 4, 13, 15, 19, 119, and 120. U.S. 33 was once part of the original Lincoln Highway.

=== Other forms ===
A bus system known as the Interurban Trolley serves several municipalities throughout Elkhart County, connecting Elkhart and Goshen, as well as Osceola, Dunlap and Mishawaka, using buses that look like trolley cars. These buses are manufactured at government expense in RV facilities of Elkhart County. The county's only Amtrak and Greyhound bus stations are in Elkhart.

Elkhart, Nappanee, and Goshen all have municipal airports. Amtrak makes four daily stops in Elkhart.

== Education ==
The county has seven public school districts, seven private schools, and one college. Several other colleges have satellite campuses in the city of Elkhart.

=== Public schools ===
The Elkhart Community Schools, the largest district, serves the populated northwest side of the county. The system includes fourteen elementary schools (Beardsley, Bristol, Cleveland, Eastwood, Hawthorne, Mary Beck, Mary Daly, Mary Feeser, Monger, Osolo, Pinewood, Riverview, Roosevelt STEAM Academy, and Woodland), three middle schools (North Side, Pierre Moran, and West Side), two high schools (Central and Memorial), which in 2020 merged into a singular Elkhart High School, one alternative school (Tipton Street Center), and the Elkhart Area Career Center.

The Middlebury Community Schools serve the northeast side of the county. This system includes four elementary schools (Jefferson, Middlebury, Orchard View, and York), one intermediate school (Heritage), one middle school, and one high school both named Northridge.

The Fairfield Community Schools serve the county's southeast corner. This system includes three elementary schools (Benton, Millersburg, and New Paris) and a junior-senior high school named Fairfield.

The Wa-Nee Community Schools serve the southwest portion of the county. This system consists of three elementary schools (Nappanee, Wakarusa, and Woodview), a middle school, and a high school both named NorthWood.

The Baugo Community Schools serve the west-central part of the county. This system is made up of an elementary, an intermediate, a junior high, and a high school each named Jimtown.

The Concord Community Schools serve the southeast side of the city of Elkhart and northwest Goshen. This system consists of four elementary schools (East Side, Ox Bow, South Side, and West Side), an intermediate school, a junior high school, and a high school; all named Concord.

Finally, the Goshen Community Schools serve the central part of Elkhart County. This system is made up of seven elementary schools (Chamberlain, Chandler, Model, Parkside, Prairieview, Waterford, and West Goshen), a middle and a high school all named Goshen.

=== Private schools ===
In addition to the public schools, there are nine private schools in the county. Kessington Christian School (grades PK-12) is in Bristol; Elkhart Christian Academy (grades K-12), Trinity Lutheran School (grades K-8), St. Vincent de Paul Catholic School (grades PK-8), and St. Thomas the Apostle School (grades K-8) are in Elkhart; while Bethany Christian (grades 4–12), Bashor Alternative School (grades 4–10), St. John the Evangelist Catholic School (grades PK-6), and Clinton Christian School (grades K-12) are in Goshen.

=== Higher education ===
Elkhart County has six institutions for higher learning, two of which are solely located in the county: Goshen College, a small Mennonite liberal arts college of 1000 students in Goshen; and the Anabaptist Mennonite Biblical Seminary, which has been operating on Elkhart's south side since 1958.

The city of Elkhart has four satellite campuses within its city limits. Bethel College of Mishawaka has a small satellite campus on the south side, Indiana Institute of Technology has a small operation on Middlebury Street, Indiana University South Bend has its "Elkhart Center" downtown, and Ivy Tech Community College has a campus as well.

== Recreation ==
=== County parks and lands ===
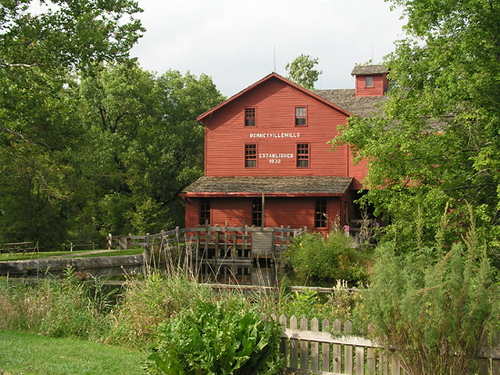
A view of the mill at Bonneyville Mill County Park

Bonneyville Mill Park consists of 223 acres (0.90 km^{2}) of rolling hills, marshes, and woodlands on the Little Elkhart River east of Bristol. The park offers hiking trails, fishing spots, shelters, and guided tours of Bonneyville Mill. The mill is still used to produce flour.

Ox Bow Park sits on 113 acres (0.46 km^{2}) overlooking the Elkhart River midway between Elkhart and Goshen. The park offers hiking trails, shelters, disc golf, and an archery range.

River Preserve Park is 1,050 acres (4.2 km^{2}) located between Benton and the Goshen Dam also on the Elkhart River. The park also offers several trails and shelters and provides insight into the history of Indiana's waterways.

Treasure Island Park offers fishing and canoe access to the St. Joseph River west of Elkhart while the Turkey Creek (two miles south of Goshen) and Wolf Lake (two miles north of Goshen) sites have no public access but are described as "future parks."

The cities and towns of Elkhart County also have numerous parks and greenways.

=== Museums ===
- Bonneyville Mill, in the park of the same name east of Bristol, shows the inner workings of a grain mill.
- Bristol is home to the Elkhart County Historical Museum.
- The Jimtown Historic Museum depicts life in the 19th century.
- The Midwest Museum of American Art is in Elkhart and has over 2500 works in its collection.
- The National New York Central Railroad Museum in Elkhart tells the history of the New York Central, Penn Central, Amtrak and Conrail railroads.
- The RV/MH Hall of Fame & Museum is on the northeast side of Elkhart.
- Ruthmere is a grand 1910 Beaux Arts mansion with significant fine arts and decorative arts collections, an arts reference library, vintage automobiles, gardens, and a greenhouse. Collections include works of art by Rodin, Camille Claudel, Louis Comfort Tiffany, Samuel Morse, Jane Stuart, and other important European and American artists of the 19th and early 20th century.
- "Time Was", a small historical museum that interprets life in late 19th and early 20th century Elkhart and includes collections of print material, photographs, objects, and general memorabilia.

=== Sports team ===
Elkhart's North Side Gymnasium was home to the Elkhart Express International Basketball League team. However, after (2) winning seasons, the Express ceased to exist in 2009.

=== Annual events ===
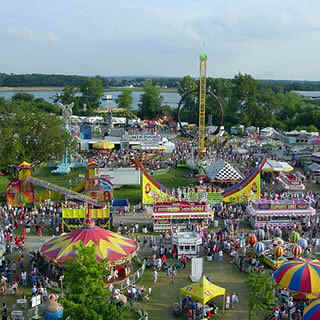
A typical scene at the Elkhart County 4-H Fair

- Bristol holds an annual Homecoming Festival during the first week of July and nearby Bonneyville Mill Park hosts a harvest celebration every September.
- Elkhart hosts the Elkhart Jazz Festival and the Rhapsody in Green Summer celebration. Both take place in June.
- Goshen plays host to First Fridays events on the first weekend of every month throughout the year. Thousands visit downtown Goshen each year to attend the varied festivals which take place each month.
- Middlebury holds a Summer Festival every August.
- Nappanee and Amish Acres host the Amish Acres Arts & Crafts Festival at the end of July.
- Wakarusa hosts an annual Maple Syrup Festival every April.
- The newly renovated Lerner Theater (the former ELCO Theater), in Elkhart, the Goshen Linway Plaza Theater, and the Amish Acres Round Barn Theater in Nappanee sits on 40 acres (16 ha) of rural Amish land and is host to live theater productions throughout the year.

All of these events draw in many people every year, but the biggest event, by far, in the county is the Elkhart County 4-H Fair. This nine-day event is one of the largest county fairs in the United States.

== Media ==
The Elkhart Truth and The Goshen News are the two daily newspapers that serve the county while Bristol, Middlebury, and Nappanee all have weekly newspapers.

Elkhart County lies in the South Bend-Elkhart television market, the 89th largest in the United States as of 2008. One television station, WSJV-TV (Fox), is located in Elkhart along with several radio stations including WTRC, WLEG, WFRN and WVPE (NPR). Radio Stations WKAM and Goshen College's WGCS are located in Goshen.

=== Notable media mentions ===
- On Palm Sunday 1965, a flurry of severe weather moved through the county. After three tornadoes (one was a twin tornado), 66 people had died in Elkhart County. 137 would die on this day statewide.
- In 1999, officer Thomas Goodwin became Goshen's first, and to date, only police officer killed in the line of duty.
- The Accra-Pac Factory in Elkhart had two fatal explosions, in 1976 and 1997.
- On December 6, 2001, Goshen received national news coverage due to a shooting at the Nu-Wood factory. The gunman killed one co-worker, wounded six others, and then killed himself.
- Much of Devil's Playground, an Amish coming-of-age documentary by director Lucy Walker, was filmed in Elkhart and Lagrange Counties.
- On February 9, 2009 U.S. President Barack Obama held a town hall meeting at Concord High School in Elkhart to discuss the economic downturn and promote his economic stimulus package. He chose Elkhart because it had one of the highest unemployment rates in the nation.

== Notable people ==
- Edward Bonney (1807–1863), detective, bounty hunter, and city planner of the defunct town of Bonneyville, present-day Bonneyville Mill County Park, in Bonneyville Mills
- Frederick A. Herring, a Textile manufacturer, evangelist, dissident in Elberfeld (Rhineland) / physician and botanist in Goshen (1812–1908)

== See also ==
- List of counties in Indiana
- List of counties in Michigan
- Michiana
- National Register of Historic Places listings in Elkhart County, Indiana
- List of public art in Elkhart County, Indiana
