= Concord Township, Elkhart County, Indiana =

Concord Township
- Township
- Location of Concord Township in Elkhart County
- Coordinates: 41°39′10″N 85°56′38″W
- Country: United States
- State: Indiana
- County: Elkhart

Government
  - Type: Indiana township

Area
  - Total: 36.86 sq mi (95.5 km^{2})
  - Land: 36.15 sq mi (93.6 km^{2})
  - Water: 0.71 sq mi (1.8 km^{2})
- Elevation: 764 ft (233 m)

Population (2020)
  - Total: 55,903
  - Density: 1,498.4/sq mi (578.5/km^{2})
- FIPS code: 18-14842
- GNIS feature ID: 453245

Concord Township is one of sixteen townships in Elkhart County, Indiana. As of the 2000 census, its population was 54,167.

== History ==
Concord Township was founded in 1830.

The Joseph and Sarah Puterbaugh Farm was listed on the National Register of Historic Places in 1995.

== Geography ==
According to the 2010 census, the township has a total area of 36.86 square miles (95.5 km^{2}), of which 36.15 square miles (93.6 km^{2}) (or 98.07%) is land and 0.71 square miles (1.8 km^{2}) (or 1.93%) is water.

=== Cities and towns ===
- Dunlap
- Elkhart (south half)
- Goshen (northwest edge)

=== Unincorporated towns ===
- De Camp Gardens

(This list is based on USGS data and may include former settlements.)

=== Adjacent townships ===
- Osolo Township (north)
- Washington Township (northeast)
- Jefferson Township (east)
- Elkhart Township (southeast)
- Harrison Township (south)
- Olive Township (southwest)
- Baugo Township (west)
- Cleveland Township (northwest)

=== Major highways ===
- US 20
- US 33
- SR 19
- SR 120

=== Cemeteries ===
The township contains five cemeteries: Burkett, Grace Lawn, Prairie Street, Rice, Rowe and Frame.
