= Jamestown, Elkhart County, Indiana =

- Unincorporated community
- Location within Indiana Location within the United States
- Coordinates: 41°38′08″N 86°01′22″W
- Country: United States
- State: Indiana
- County: Elkhart
- Township: Baugo
- Elevation: 778 ft (237 m)
- ZIP code: 46517
- FIPS code: 18-37710
- GNIS feature ID: 436932

Jamestown (also known as Jimtown) is an unincorporated community in Baugo Township, Elkhart County, Indiana, United States.

== History ==
Jamestown was officially established as a village in 1835, a few years after eight families formed a settlement at the location, which was near a Potawatomi community. It was named for its founder, James Davis.

== Geography ==
Jamestown is traversed by Baugo Creek, with the Saint Joseph River to the north.

== Education ==
The community's schools are operated by the Baugo Community Schools district, with approximately 1900 students, and include Jimtown High School, Jimtown Junior High School, and Jimtown Elementary School. The Jimtown school mascot is the Jimmie.
