= Bainter Town, Indiana =

- Unincorporated community
- Location within Indiana Location within the United States
- Coordinates: 41°31′01″N 85°49′02″W
- Country: United States
- State: Indiana
- County: Elkhart
- Township: Jackson
- Elevation: 810 ft (250 m)
- ZIP code: 46553
- FIPS code: 18-03160
- GNIS feature ID: 430414

Bainter Town is an unincorporated community in Jackson Township, Elkhart County, Indiana.

== History ==
A Mr. Bainter owned the mill in which the town is named after.
