= Indiana State Road 119 =

Highway in Indiana, USA

State Road 119
- SR 119 highlighted in red

Route information
- Maintained by INDOT
- Length: 23.948 mi (38.541 km)

Southern segment
- Length: 13.674 mi (22.006 km)
- South end: SR 16 / SR 39 in Buffalo
- North end: US 35 in Winamac

Northern segment
- Length: 10.274 mi (16.534 km)
- South end: SR 19 near Wakarusa
- North end: SR 15 in Goshen

Location
- Country: United States
- State: Indiana
- Counties: Elkhart, Pulaski, White

Highway system
- Indiana State Highway System; Interstate; US; State; Scenic
← SR 117	→ SR 120

State Road 119 exists as two separate roads in the U.S. state of Indiana. The road is a rural surface highway for the entire length of both sections.

== Route description ==
=== Southern section ===
The southern section is 18.2 miles (29.3 km) long. Its southern terminus is in Buffalo in White County, at the intersection of State Road 16 and State Road 39. The roads runs east from there and is concurrent with SR 16 until that road goes south, whereas SR 119 goes north. It continues in a generally northern direction passing through Headlee, until it terminates at U.S. Route 35 in Winamac in Pulaski County.

=== Northern section ===
The northern section is 10.22 miles (16.45 km) long and exists entirely in Elkhart County. The southern terminus is at State Road 19 just south of Wakarusa. The road continues northeast passing through Southwest. Just west of Goshen SR 119 turns due east toward State Road 15 in Goshen. In Goshen SR 119 is concurrent with Plymouth Ave.

== History ==
SR 119 went as far south as Monticello, now that route is part of State Road 39.

The first path along part of the modern SR 119 roadway was the Plymouth-Goshen Trail. The trail was founded on October 19, 1835, to connect the county seats of Marshall County, Plymouth, and Elkhart County, Goshen. At this time counties built trails to connect county seats with other county seats. Surveyors places wooden posted at one mile interval along the route and documented the entire path. In February 1851, the Plymouth Goshen Plank Road Company was founded and begin converting the trail to a plank road. The company placed toll barriers every six miles along the entire length of the road. On March 18, 1932, the section of road between SR 19 and SR 15 became a state highway and the remaining sections of the trail remained as county roads or city streets. SR 119 was formed to connect SR 19 with SR 15 and the city of Goshen.

== Major intersections ==
County	Location	mi	km	Destinations	Notes
White	Buffalo			SR 16 west / SR 39 – Monticello, Monon	Southern terminus of SR 119; western end of SR 16 concurrency
White	Cass Township	0.000	0.000	SR 16 east – Royal Center	Eastern end of SR 16 concurrency
Pulaski	Winamac	13.674	22.006	US 35 – Michigan City, Logansport	Northern terminus of the southern section of SR 119
Gap in route
Elkhart	Union Township	13.675	22.008	SR 19	Southern terminus of the northern section of SR 119
Elkhart	Harrison–Elkhart township line	20.703	33.318	CR 17	
Elkhart	Goshen	23.948	38.541	SR 15 (Main Street)	Northern terminus of SR 119
1.000 mi = 1.609 km; 1.000 km = 0.621 mi: Concurrency terminus
