= Concord Community Schools =

Concord Community Schools may refer to:

- Concord Community Schools (Indiana)
- Concord Community Schools (Michigan)
