= Cleveland Township, Elkhart County, Indiana =

Cleveland Township
- Township
- Location of Cleveland Township in Elkhart County
- Coordinates: 41°43′21″N 86°01′53″W
- Country: United States
- State: Indiana
- County: Elkhart

Government
  - Type: Indiana township

Area
  - Total: 16.47 sq mi (42.7 km^{2})
  - Land: 15.88 sq mi (41.1 km^{2})
  - Water: 0.59 sq mi (1.5 km^{2})
- Elevation: 771 ft (235 m)

Population (2020)
  - Total: 12,858
  - Density: 702.6/sq mi (271.3/km^{2})
- FIPS code: 18-13528
- GNIS feature ID: 453225

Cleveland Township is one of sixteen townships in Elkhart County, Indiana. As of the 2010 census, its population was 11,158.

== History ==
Cleveland Township was established in 1835, and named after Cleveland, Ohio, perhaps due to that city's nickname - "The Forest City".

== Geography ==
According to the 2010 census, the township has a total area of 16.47 square miles (42.7 km^{2}), of which 15.88 square miles (41.1 km^{2}) (or 96.42%) is land and 0.59 square miles (1.5 km^{2}) (or 3.58%) is water. Boot Lake is in this township.

=== Cities and towns ===
- Elkhart (west quarter)

=== Adjacent townships ===
- Osolo Township (east)
- Concord Township (southeast)
- Baugo Township (south)
- Penn Township, St. Joseph County (southwest)
- Harris Township, St. Joseph County (west)

=== Major highways ===
- I-80
- I-90
- Indiana Toll Road

=== Cemeteries ===
The township contains two cemeteries; Carlton Cemetery and California Road Cemetery.

== Education ==
The township has the Cleveland Branch Library, a branch of the Elkhart Public Library.
