= Olive Township, Indiana =

Olive Township is the name of two townships in Indiana:

- Olive Township, Elkhart County, Indiana
- Olive Township, St. Joseph County, Indiana
