= Locke Township, Elkhart County, Indiana =

Locke Township
- Township
- Location of Locke Township in Elkhart County
- Coordinates: 41°28′48″N 86°01′52″W
- Country: United States
- State: Indiana
- County: Elkhart

Government
  - Type: Indiana township

Area
  - Total: 17.78 sq mi (46.0 km^{2})
  - Land: 17.78 sq mi (46.0 km^{2})
  - Water: 0 sq mi (0 km^{2})
- Elevation: 863 ft (263 m)

Population (2020)
  - Total: 4,328
  - Density: 220/sq mi (85/km^{2})
- FIPS code: 18-44514
- GNIS feature ID: 453576

Locke Township is one of sixteen townships in Elkhart County, Indiana. As of the 2010 census, its population was 3,913.

== History ==
Locke Township was organized in the 1840s. It was named for Samuel Lockwood, a pioneer settler and native of Vermont.

== Geography ==
According to the 2010 census, the township has a total area of 17.78 square miles (46.0 km^{2}), all land.

=== Cities and towns ===
- Nappanee (northwest quarter)

=== Unincorporated towns ===
- Locke

=== Adjacent townships ===
- Olive Township (north)
- Harrison Township (northeast)
- Union Township (east)
- Jefferson Township, Kosciusko County (southeast)
- Scott Township, Kosciusko County (south)
- German Township, Marshall County (southwest)
- Madison Township, St. Joseph County (northwest)

=== Major highways ===
- US 6
- SR 19
