= Dierdorff Farmstead =

- U.S. National Register of Historic Places
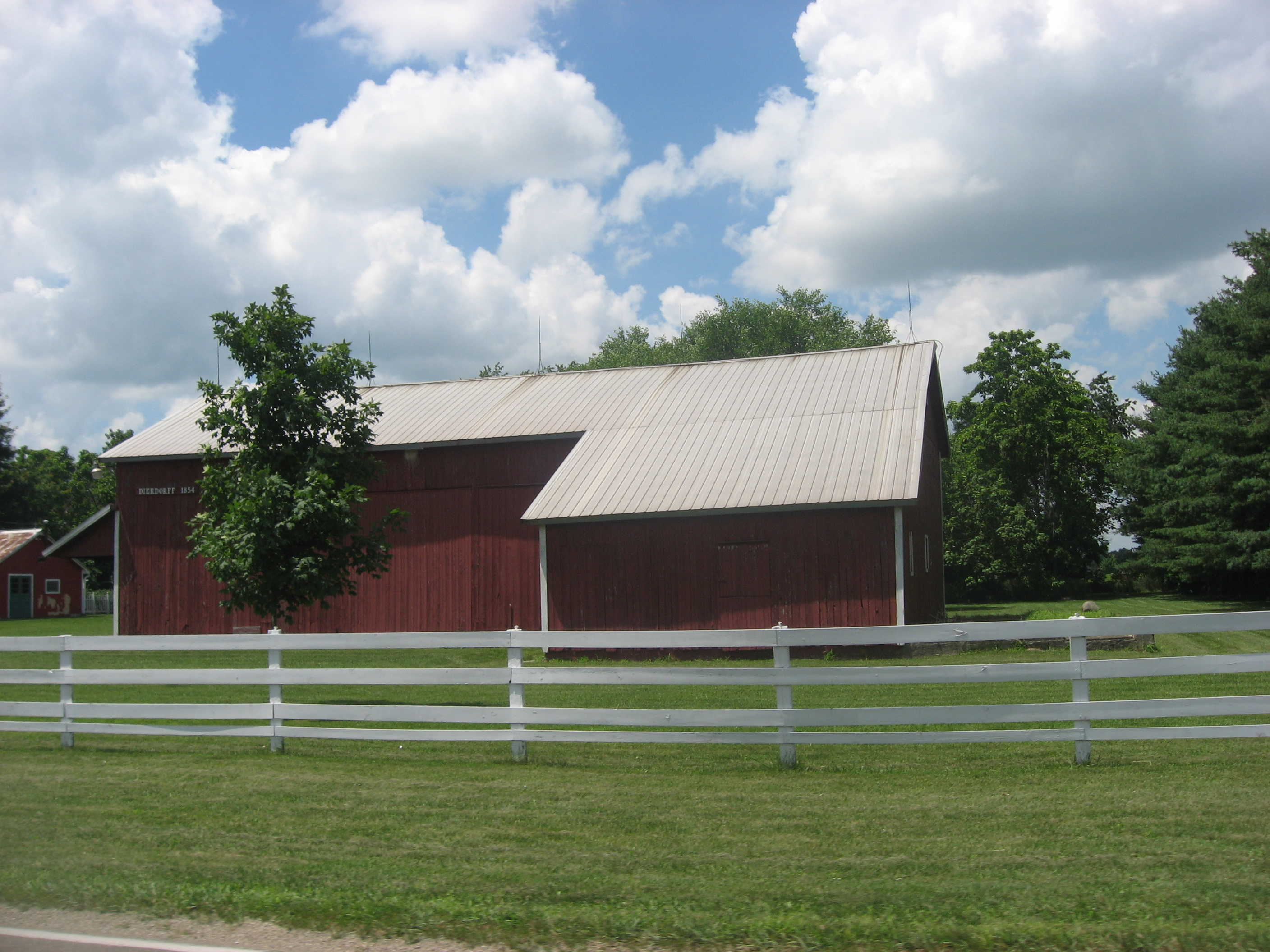
- Dierdorff Farmstead barn, July 2013

- Location within Indiana Location within the United States
- Location: 2055 Dierdorff Rd., southeast of Goshen, Elkhart Township, Elkhart County, Indiana
- Coordinates: 41°33′36″N 85°48′18″W
- Area: 4.46 acres (1.80 ha)
- Built: c. 1854, 1892
- Architectural style: Queen Anne
- NRHP reference No.: 11000122
- Added to NRHP: March 25, 2011

Dierdorff Farmstead is a historic home and farm located in Elkhart Township, Elkhart County, Indiana. The house was built in 1892, and is a two-story, frame dwelling with Queen Anne style design elements. It has a wraparound porch with Eastlake movement details and a patterned slate gable roof. The property also includes the contributing English barn (c. 1854), summer kitchen (1892), windmill (c. 1892), and poultry shed (c. 1920).

It was added to the National Register of Historic Places in 2011.
