= Foraker, Indiana =

- Unincorporated community
- Location within Indiana Location within the United States
- Coordinates: 41°30′57″N 85°55′27″W
- Country: United States
- State: Indiana
- County: Elkhart
- Township: Union
- Elevation: 856 ft (261 m)
- ZIP code: 46526
- FIPS code: 18-23872
- GNIS feature ID: 434635

Foraker is an unincorporated community in Union Township, Elkhart County, Indiana.

== History ==
Foraker was founded in 1892 when the Wabash Railroad was extended to that point. It was named for Joseph B. Foraker, the 37th Governor of Ohio.

The Foraker post office was discontinued in 1966.
