= Bonneyville Mills, Indiana =

- Unincorporated community
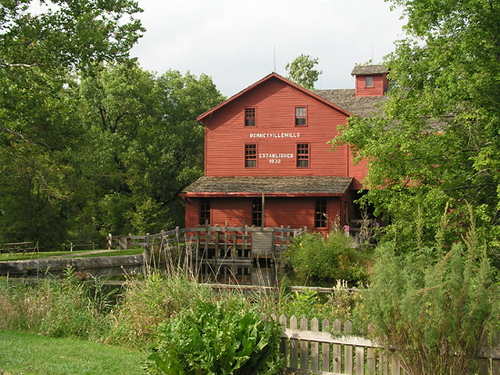
- Historic Bonneyville Mills

- Location within Indiana Location within the United States
- Coordinates: 41°43′05″N 85°45′55″W
- Country: United States
- State: Indiana
- County: Elkhart
- Township: York
- Elevation: 778 ft (237 m)
- ZIP code: 46507
- FIPS code: 18-06410
- GNIS feature ID: 431324

Bonneyville Mills is an unincorporated community in York Township, Elkhart County, Indiana.

== History ==
Edward Bonney, the bounty hunter and amateur detective, from Hittsboro, Essex County, New York, founded Bonneyville, Indiana, and built a gristmill, known as Bonneyville Mill, in 1837, which became the town namesake. Bonneyville would later, be renamed Bonneyville Mills. Bonneyville Mill was added to the National Register of Historic Places in 1976.
