= Locke, Indiana =

- Unincorporated community
- Location within Indiana Location within the United States
- Coordinates: 41°28′18″N 86°00′44″W
- Country: United States
- State: Indiana
- County: Elkhart
- Township: Locke
- Elevation: 876 ft (267 m)
- ZIP code: 46550
- FIPS code: 18-44496
- GNIS feature ID: 438200

Locke is an unincorporated community in Locke Township, Elkhart County, Indiana.

== History ==
Locke was laid out in 1867. It took its name from Locke Township.
