= Joseph and Sarah Puterbaugh Farm =

Historic house in Indiana, United States

- U.S. National Register of Historic Places
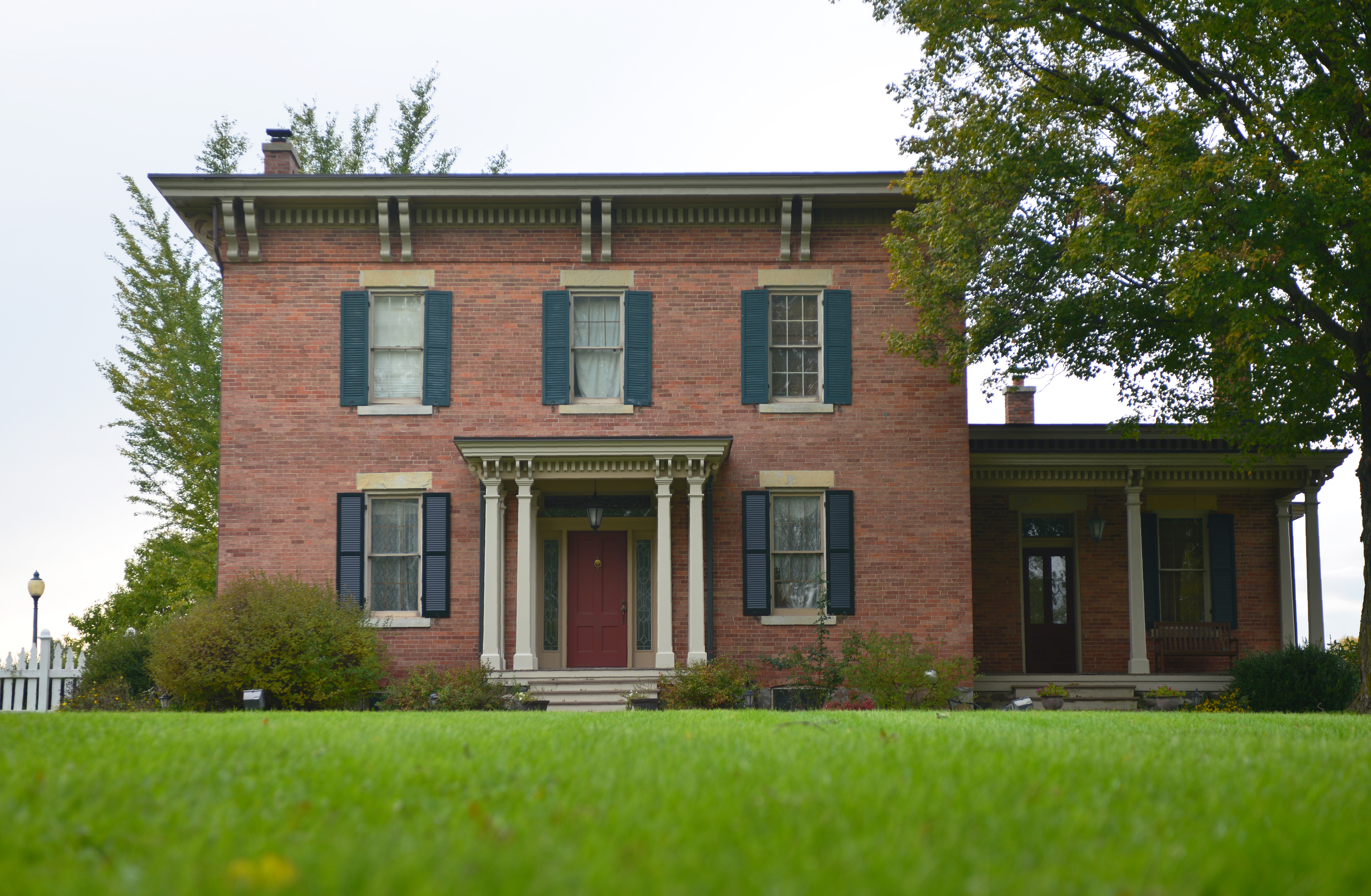
- Joseph and Sarah Puterbaugh Farmhouse

- Location within Indiana Location within the United States
- Location: 59123 County Road 9, south of Elkhart, Concord Township, Elkhart County, Indiana
- Coordinates: 41°38′10″N 85°57′57″W
- Area: 1.3 acres (0.53 ha)
- Built: c. 1850, c. 1860
- Architectural style: Italianate
- NRHP reference No.: 95000198
- Added to NRHP: March 3, 1995

Joseph and Sarah Puterbaugh Farm, also known as Puterbaugh-Haines House, is a historic home located in Concord Township, Elkhart County, Indiana. The house was built about 1860, and is a two-story, three-bay, Italianate style brick dwelling with a one-story setback wing. It has a hipped roof and features a portico supported by square columns. The property also includes a contributing English bank barn (c. 1850).

It was added to the National Register of Historic Places in 1995.
