= Olive Township, Elkhart County, Indiana =

Olive Township
- Township
- Location of Olive Township in Elkhart County
- Coordinates: 41°33′37″N 86°01′53″W
- Country: United States
- State: Indiana
- County: Elkhart

Government
  - Type: Indiana township

Area
  - Total: 18.15 sq mi (47.0 km^{2})
  - Land: 18.08 sq mi (46.8 km^{2})
  - Water: 0.08 sq mi (0.21 km^{2})
- Elevation: 823 ft (251 m)

Population (2020)
  - Total: 3,388
  - Density: 169.7/sq mi (65.5/km^{2})
- FIPS code: 18-56520
- GNIS feature ID: 453687

Olive Township is one of sixteen townships in Elkhart County, Indiana. As of the 2010 census, its population was 3,068.

== History ==
Olive Township was organized in 1836.

== Geography ==
According to the 2010 census, the township has a total area of 18.15 square miles (47.0 km^{2}), of which 18.08 square miles (46.8 km^{2}) (or 99.61%) is land and 0.08 square miles (0.21 km^{2}) (or 0.44%) is water.

=== Cities and towns ===
- Wakarusa (north three-quarters)

=== Adjacent townships ===
- Baugo Township (north)
- Concord Township (northeast)
- Harrison Township (east)
- Union Township (southeast)
- Locke Township (south)
- Madison Township, St. Joseph County (west)
- Penn Township, St. Joseph County (northwest)

=== Major highways ===
- SR 19

=== Cemeteries ===
The township contains two cemeteries: Pletcher and Shutts.

== Education ==
Olive Township residents are eligible to obtain a library card at the Wakarusa-Olive & Harrison Township Public Library in Wakarusa.
