= List of public art in Elkhart County, Indiana =

This is a list of public art in Elkhart County, Indiana.

This list applies only to works of public art accessible in an outdoor public space. For example, this does not include artwork visible inside a museum.

Most of the works mentioned are sculptures. When this is not the case (e.g., sound installation,) it is stated next to the title.

== Bristol ==
Title	Artist	Year	Location/GPS Coordinates	Material	Dimensions	Owner	Image
Relief Panels	Henry Mascotte	1978	St. Mary's Catholic Church	Cast Concrete	2 panels. Each panel: approx. 4 ft. x 38 ft. x 3 in.	St. Mary of the Annunciation	

== Elkhart ==
Title	Artist	Year	Location/GPS Coordinates	Material	Dimensions	Owner	Image
Crucifix	James Flanigan	1983	St. Thomas the Apostle Catholic Church 41°42′7.85″N 85°58′38.99″W	Bronze	Approx. 12 1/2 ft. x 10 1/2 ft. x 2 in.	St. Thomas the Apostle Catholic Church	
Havilah Beardsley Monument	Pierre Bazzanti	1913	Beardsley Avenue & Riverside Drive 41°41′33.93″N 85°58′42.53″W	Bronze	Sculpture: approx. 6 1/2 ft. x 29 in. x 24 in.	City of Elkhart	
Immaculate Queen of Peace	Kaletta Company	1948	St. Vincent de Paul Church	Concrete & Paint	Statue: approx. 74 x 21 x 15 in.	St. Vincent de Paul Church	
Paul Bunyan	Unknown	1965	Palmer True Value Hardware 41°42′19.79″N 85°58′22.53″W	Fiberglass	Approx. 20 ft. x 7 ft. 2 in. x 6 ft.	Palmer True Value Hardware	
Roses of Yesterday	Harriet Whitney Frishmuth	1928	Rice and Gracelawn Cemetery	Bronze	Sculpture: approx. 62 x 29 x 19 in.	Rice and Gracelawn Cemetery	
Soldiers and Sailors Monument	Moore & Dickerhoff	1909	Rice & Graceland Cemetery	Marble	Sculpture: approx. 7 x 2 x 2 ft.	Rice & Graceland Cemetery	
Soldiers and Sailors Monument	Nelson P. Doty	1889	Rice Cemetery	Bronze & Limestone	Sculpture: approx. 6 ft. x 26 in. x 22 in.	Rice & Graceland Cemetery	
Windstream	John Mishler	1988	High Dive Park	Steel	Sculpture: approx. 18 x 8 x 6 ft.	High Dive Park	

== Goshen ==
Title	Artist	Year	Location/GPS Coordinates	Material	Dimensions	Owner	Image
Broken Shields	John Mishler	1981	Goshen College	Steel	Sculpture: approx. 108 x 80 x 92 in.	Goshen College	
Poseidon	J. L. Mott Iron Works	1912	Elkhart County Courthouse	Bronze, Lead & Zinc	Sculpture: approx. 10 1/2 x 5 x 3 ft.	City of Goshen	
