= Waterford Mills, Indiana =

- Unincorporated community
- Location within Indiana Location within the United States
- Coordinates: 41°32′35″N 85°49′50″W
- Country: United States
- State: Indiana
- County: Elkhart
- Township: Elkhart
- Elevation: 804 ft (245 m)
- Time zone: Eastern Time
- ZIP code: 46526
- FIPS code: 18-81260
- GNIS feature ID: 445538

Waterford Mills is an unincorporated community in Elkhart Township, Elkhart County, Indiana, USA.

== History ==
A gristmill was built on the east side of the Elkhart River in 1833, and the village that grew around it was called Waterford. A post office called Waterford Mills was established in 1853 and remained in operation until it was discontinued in 1904.
