= Wakarusa, Indiana =

- Town
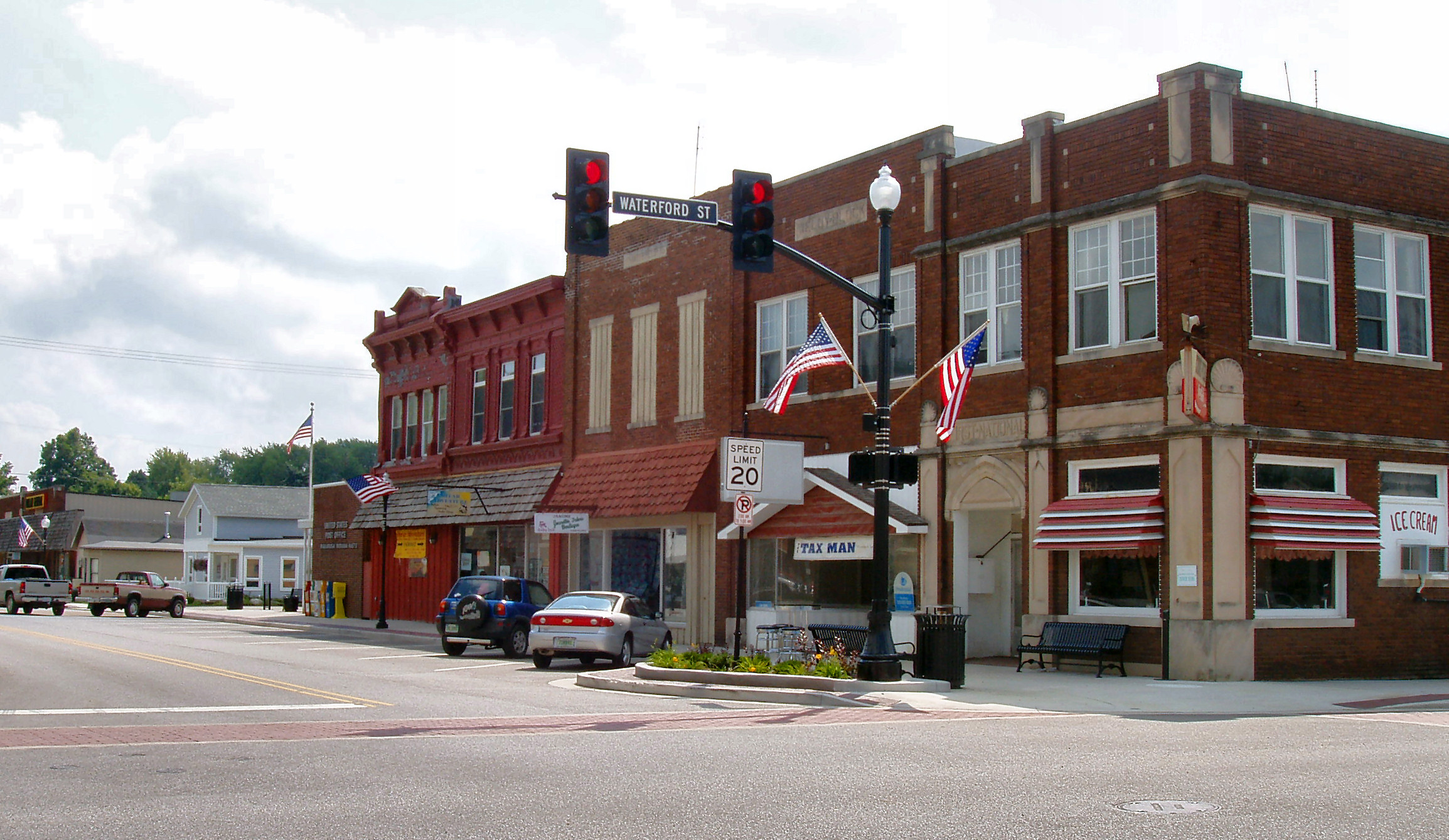
- Downtown Wakarusa

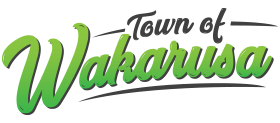
- Logo

- Location of Wakarusa in Elkhart County, Indiana.
- Coordinates: 41°31′55″N 86°00′00″W
- Country: United States
- State: Indiana
- County: Elkhart
- Township: Harrison, Olive

Area
  - Total: 2.28 sq mi (5.91 km^{2})
  - Land: 2.20 sq mi (5.71 km^{2})
  - Water: 0.077 sq mi (0.20 km^{2})
- Elevation: 850 ft (260 m)

Population (2020)
  - Total: 1,998
  - Density: 910/sq mi (350/km^{2})
- Time zone: UTC-5 (Eastern (EST))
  - Summer (DST): UTC-4 (EDT)
- ZIP code: 46573
- Area code: 574
- FIPS code: 18-79478
- GNIS feature ID: 2397717
- Website: townofwakarusa.com

Wakarusa is a town in Harrison and Olive townships in Elkhart County, Indiana, United States. As of the 2020 census, Wakarusa had a population of 1,998.

Wakarusa is a small farming and manufacturing community located on Indiana 19 just north of Indiana 119. The town is 12 miles (19 km) south of Elkhart, 25 miles (40 km) southeast of South Bend, 120 miles (190 km) east of Chicago, and 140 miles (230 km) north of Indianapolis.

== Geography ==
According to the 2010 census, Wakarusa has a total area of 2.277 square miles (5.90 km^{2}), of which 2.2 square miles (5.70 km^{2}) (or 96.62%) is land and 0.077 square miles (0.20 km^{2}) (or 3.38%) is water.

== History ==
In 1836, rural Olive Township was formed in western Elkhart County, and in 1849, as the population grew, a post office named Mt. Olive opened. After more population growth, a new village named Salem was established to prevent people from having to travel to either Goshen or Elkhart to conduct business. Since there is already a town named Salem in Indiana, the name was changed to Wakarusa in 1859. The Mt. Olive Post Office was renamed for Wakarusa a year later.

Railroad - In 1891 work began on the Wabash Railroad line through town, with the official opening of the line in the spring of 1893. The line, which connected Chicago with Montpelier, Ohio, became part of the Norfolk & Western Railway in 1964 and lasted until the 1980s. Today, the original Wabash depot along with two Norfolk & Western rail cars are featured along with many other displays at the Wakarusa Historical Museum.

The etymology of the name "Wakarusa" is not known. According to tradition, the name Wakarusa is from a Native American language, meaning "knee-deep in mud". A more recent source claims a settler named it after a location in Kansas.

== Demographics ==
Historical population
Census	Pop.	Note	%±
1870	245		—
1880	377		53.9%
1900	917		—
1910	859		−6.3%
1920	816		−5.0%
1930	973		19.2%
1940	1,033		6.2%
1950	1,143		10.6%
1960	1,145		0.2%
1970	1,160		1.3%
1980	1,281		10.4%
1990	1,667		30.1%
2000	1,618		−2.9%
2010	1,758		8.7%
2020	1,998		13.7%
U.S. Decennial Census

=== 2020 census ===
As of the 2020 census, Wakarusa had a population of 1,998. The median age was 37.8 years. 26.1% of residents were under the age of 18 and 21.8% of residents were 65 years of age or older. For every 100 females there were 88.0 males, and for every 100 females age 18 and over there were 79.6 males age 18 and over.

0.0% of residents lived in urban areas, while 100.0% lived in rural areas.

There were 729 households in Wakarusa, of which 38.0% had children under the age of 18 living in them. Of all households, 54.6% were married-couple households, 15.1% were households with a male householder and no spouse or partner present, and 26.9% were households with a female householder and no spouse or partner present. About 27.2% of all households were made up of individuals and 16.0% had someone living alone who was 65 years of age or older.

There were 771 housing units, of which 5.4% were vacant. The homeowner vacancy rate was 0.5% and the rental vacancy rate was 12.3%.

Racial composition as of the 2020 census
Race	Number	Percent
White	1,819	91.0%
Black or African American	39	2.0%
American Indian and Alaska Native	2	0.1%
Asian	19	1.0%
Native Hawaiian and Other Pacific Islander	0	0.0%
Some other race	35	1.8%
Two or more races	84	4.2%
Hispanic or Latino (of any race)	65	3.3%

=== 2010 census ===
As of the census of 2010, there were 1,758 people, 665 households, and 448 families residing in the town. The population density was 799.1 inhabitants per square mile (308.5/km^{2}). There were 717 housing units at an average density of 325.9 per square mile (125.8/km^{2}). The racial makeup of the town was 96.0% White, 1.0% African American, 0.1% Native American, 1.0% Asian, 0.9% from other races, and 1.1% from two or more races. Hispanic or Latino of any race were 2.4% of the population.

There were 665 households, of which 33.1% had children under the age of 18 living with them, 54.0% were married couples living together, 10.8% had a female householder with no husband present, 2.6% had a male householder with no wife present, and 32.6% were non-families. 29.9% of all households were made up of individuals, and 17% had someone living alone who was 65 years of age or older. The average household size was 2.48 and the average family size was 3.09.

The median age in the town was 42 years. 24.9% of residents were under the age of 18; 7.2% were between the ages of 18 and 24; 22.1% were from 25 to 44; 23.7% were from 45 to 64, and 22.2% were 65 years of age or older. The gender makeup of the town was 45.8% male and 54.2% female.

=== 2000 census ===
As of the census of 2000, there were 1,618 people, 595 households, and 427 families residing in the town. The population density was 716.0 inhabitants per square mile (276.4/km^{2}). There were 618 housing units at an average density of 273.5 per square mile (105.6/km^{2}). The racial makeup of the town was 97.34% White, 0.49% African American, 0.19% Asian, 0.06% Pacific Islander, 0.62% from other races, and 1.30% from two or more races. Hispanic or Latino of any race were 1.48% of the population.

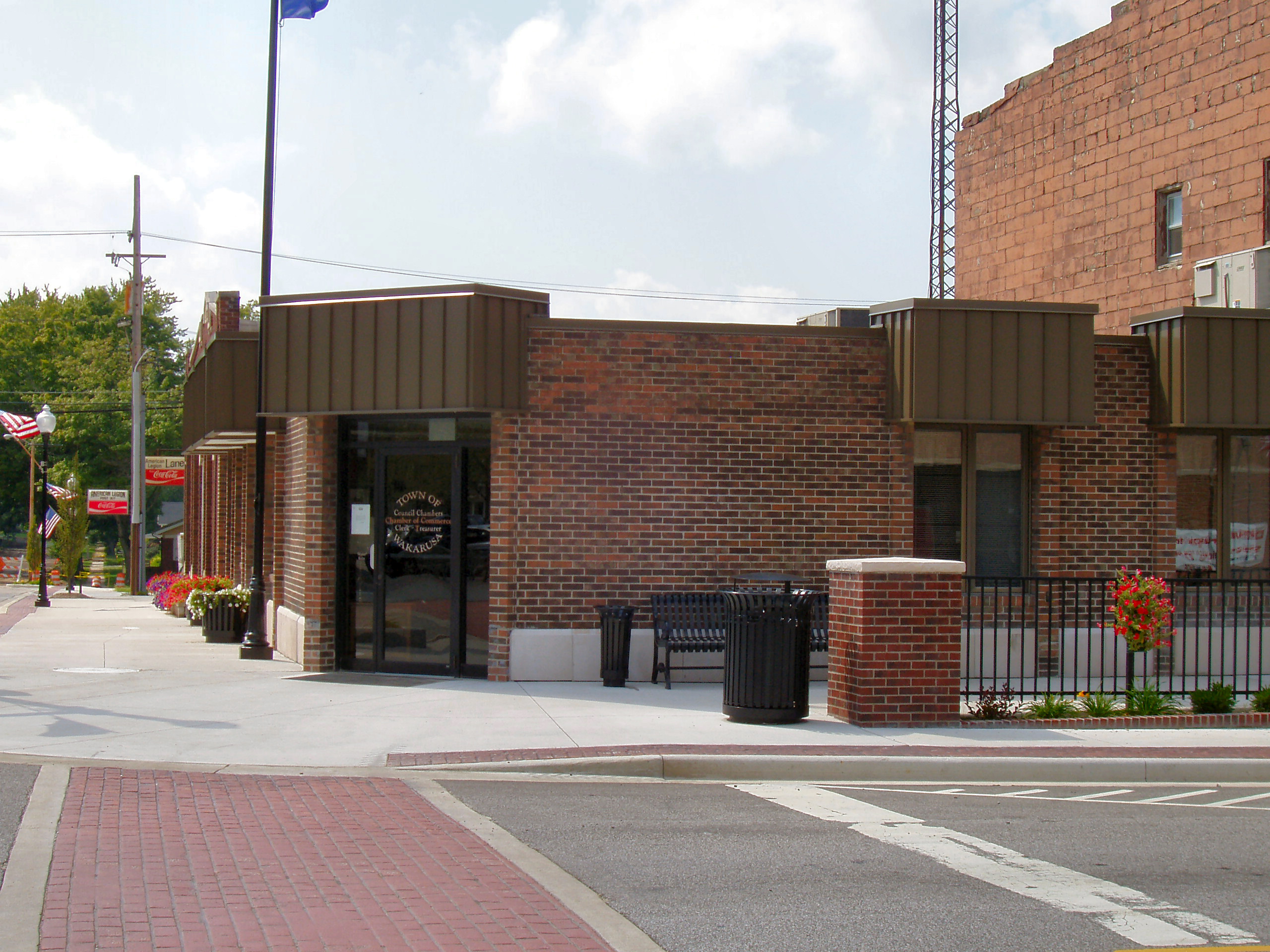
Wakarusa town hall

There were 595 households, out of which 35.3% had children under the age of 18 living with them, 58.7% were married couples living together, 10.9% had a female householder with no husband present, and 28.2% were non-families. 25.9% of all households were made up of individuals, and 13.4% had someone living alone who was 65 years of age or older. The average household size was 2.51 and the average family size was 3.04.

In the town, the population was spread out, with 26.0% under the age of 18, 7.7% from 18 to 24, 27.5% from 25 to 44, 19.0% from 45 to 64, and 19.8% who were 65 years of age or older. The median age was 37 years. For every 100 females, there were 84.7 males. For every 100 females age 18 and over, there were 79.2 males.

The median income for a household in the town was $41,515, and the median income for a family was $50,833. Males had a median income of $36,014 versus $25,300 for females. The per capita income for the town was $19,615. About 3.2% of families and 4.0% of the population were below the poverty line, including 3.8% of those under age 18 and 5.8% of those age 65 or over.

== Education ==
Neighboring Nappanee and Wakarusa combined their school systems in the 1970s to create the Wa-Nee Community Schools.

The town has a free lending library, the Wakarusa-Olive & Harrison Township Public Library.

== Religion ==
Wakarusa has Wakarusa Missionary Church, which is the Missionary Church denomination based out of Fort Wayne, Indiana. Other churches include a Bible Baptist Church, a Methodist church, Holdemen Mennonite Church, and Olive Mennonite Church just outside Wakarusa.

== Notable people ==
- J. Wayne Fredericks, American diplomat
- Gale Sayers, Chicago Bears Hall of Fame running back

== Economy ==
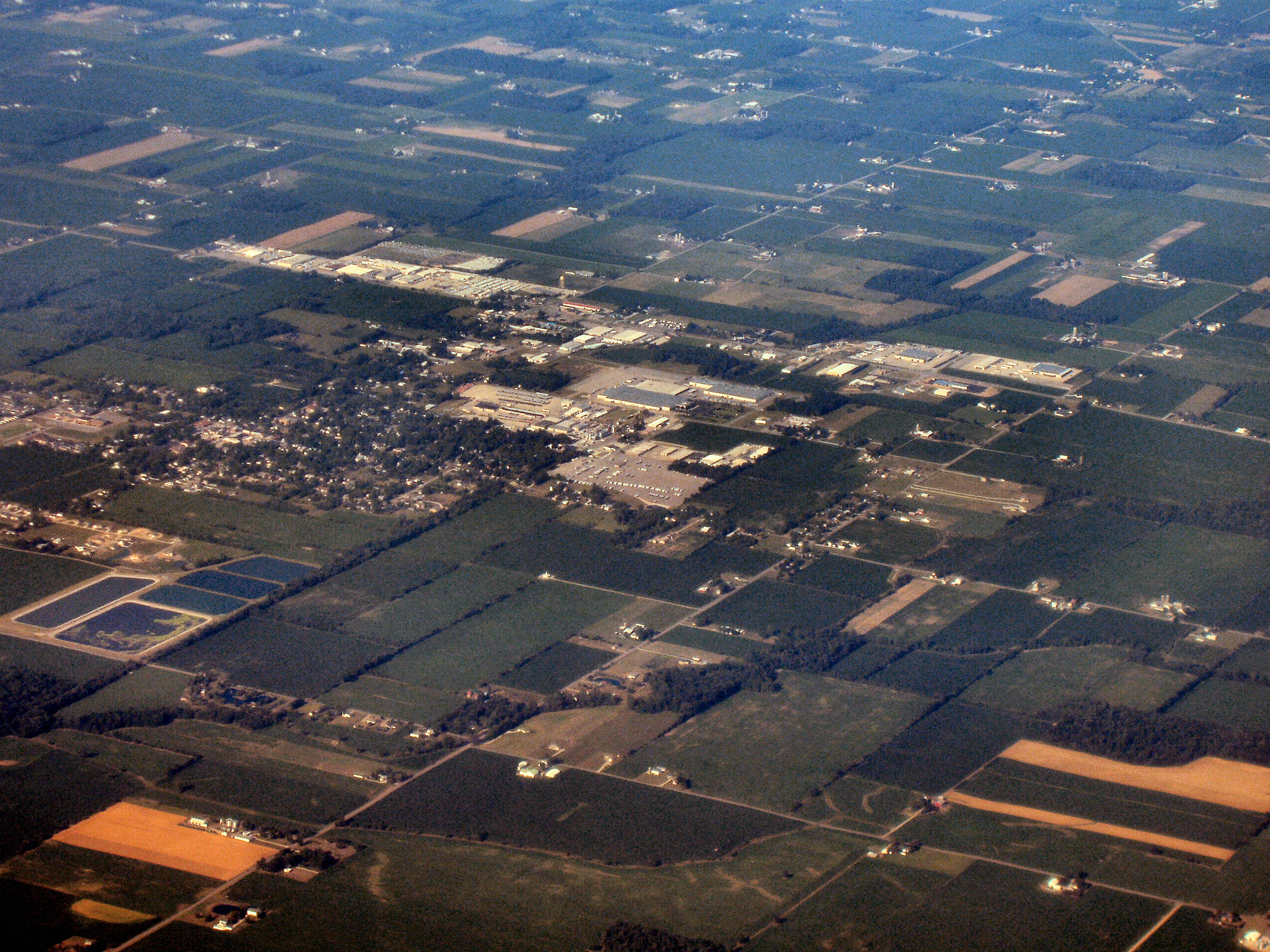
Wakarusa from the air, looking east

Originally solely a farming community, a lumber mill opened in 1866. By the 1880s, several factories and businesses existed, despite the fact that the railroad would not roll into town until 1893. At one point, three different lumber mills operated in the town, though none exist today.

Today, Wakarusa continues to have a thriving farming economy and has two grain mills within the town's limits. Wakarusa's location in Elkhart County places it within a strong industrial area, and because of this, multiple manufacturers are located in the area. Recreational vehicle manufacturing, modular home manufacturing and custom truck production are the base of the industrial economy. Forest River employs nearly 600 in the RV industry.

It was announced in February 2012 that Utilimaster, a manufacturer of walk-in vans and commercial truck bodies, was moving all of its manufacturing and headquarters to nearby Bristol, about 20 minutes to the northeast in Elkhart County. Since then, RV company Forest River has purchased nearly all of the buildings and currently employs around 600 in Wakarusa.

On July 17, 2008, Monaco Coach Corporation announced the closing of its Wakarusa production plant and laid off its approximately 1400 workers. Since then, the massive complex has been bought by Thor Industries, and they are using it for multiple operations for some of their RV brands. Currently, they employ around 700.

Today, the historic town center has several antique shops, hair salons, a furniture store, a hardware store, a general contractor, a florist, an I.T. business, a mechanic, insurance companies, restaurants, and a dime store candy shop that sells locally made maple syrup and jumbo jelly beans to a small but growing number of regional tourists.

== Festivals ==
Once a year, the town hosts the Maple Syrup Festival and holds a parade as well as other activities associated with small-town celebrations. The festival was started in 1969 by the then Chamber of Progress. Originally held in March, the festival now occurs during the end of April.

== In popular culture ==
- The 2022 novel All Good People Here by Ashley Flowers is mainly set in Wakarusa
