= WVPE =

- Elkhart, Indiana; United States
- Broadcast area: Michiana
- Frequency: 88.1 MHz (HD Radio)

Programming
- Format: Public Radio - News – Talk
- Subchannels: HD1: WVPE digital anolog simulcast; HD2: News 2; HD3: Blues 3
- Affiliations: National Public Radio; American Public Media; Public Radio Exchange; BBC World Service; Canadian Broadcasting Corporation

Ownership
- Owner: Elkhart Community Schools

History
- First air date: May 1972; 54 years ago
- Call sign meaning: "The Voice of Progressive Education"

Technical information
- Facility ID: 19365
- Class: B
- ERP: 11,500 watts
- HAAT: 304 meters (997 ft)
- Transmitter coordinates: 41°36′49.2″N 86°11′20″W

Links
- Webcast: Listen live via iHeartRadio
- Website: wvpe.org

WVPE (88.1 FM) is a non-commercial, listener-supported public radio station in Elkhart, Indiana. It is the National Public Radio member station for the Michiana region of northern Indiana and southwest Michigan. It is owned by Elkhart Community Schools, with studios in the Elkhart Area Career Center on California Road.

WVPE has an effective radiated power (ERP) of 11,500 watts, using a directional antenna. The transmitter is off Johnson Road in South Bend.

== Programming ==
WVPE features programming from NPR, American Public Media and the Public Radio Exchange. On weekdays, the schedule is made up of news and information programming with local news updates: Morning Edition, All Things Considered, Fresh Air, Marketplace, On Point, Here and Now, Think and Q from the CBC. Overnight, the BBC World Service is heard.

Weekends feature specialty shows, including The TED Radio Hour, The Moth Radio Hour, Big Picture Science, A Way with Words, The Splendid Table, Hidden Brain, On The Media and Wait, Wait, Don't Tell Me. Weekly music shows include Mountain Stage, Blues Revue, Jazz in the New Millennium and Acoustic Accents.

== History ==
WVPE signed on the air in May 1972. It originally was as a student operated station as part of Elkhart Community Schools. The station was on the air a few hours a day during the school year and was set up to give students the opportunity to train for careers in broadcasting.

In 1982, the station added its first full-time staff person and started a transition away from a student lab to serve the community as a public radio service. In 1983, the station started playing programs featuring jazz, blues, folk and other genres of music.

In 1984, it added popular weekly shows such as A Prairie Home Companion and The Thistle & Shamrock when it joined American Public Radio (forerunner to the Public Radio Exchange).

In 1987, the station added its first public radio news programming and qualified for federal funding from the Corporation for Public Broadcasting in 1990.

In 1991, the station re-joined National Public Radio bringing NPR News programming back to the region after a 16-month absence.

In 1995, the station moved to an all news and information format on weekdays with the addition of The Diane Rehm Show and Talk of the Nation.

In 2000, WVPE was recognized with awards from Indiana Associated Press and the Society of Professional Journalists followed by six awards in 2002 for news coverage (including Best Newscast from IAP, and Spectrum Award from IBA for Best News Story).

In 2003, the station received 11 awards for news coverage including an Edward R. Murrow Award for Excellence in Sports Reporting.

In 2007 the station's Michiana Chronicles commentary series won a regional Murrow award for writing. The weekly series presents stories and essays by local writers from Michiana, the region of north-central Indiana and southern Michigan roughly centered on South Bend.
