= Baugo Township, Elkhart County, Indiana =

Baugo Township
- Township
- Location of Baugo Township in Elkhart County
- Coordinates: 41°38′36″N 86°01′49″W
- Country: United States
- State: Indiana
- County: Elkhart

Government
  - Type: Indiana township

Area
  - Total: 15.01 sq mi (38.9 km^{2})
  - Land: 14.69 sq mi (38.0 km^{2})
  - Water: 0.32 sq mi (0.83 km^{2})
- Elevation: 764 ft (233 m)

Population (2020)
  - Total: 9,473
  - Density: 642/sq mi (248/km^{2})
- Postal code: 46516/46517
- Area code: 574
- FIPS code: 18-03754
- GNIS feature ID: 453099

Baugo Township is one of sixteen townships in Elkhart County, Indiana. As of the 2010 census, its population was 9,431.

== History ==
Baugo Township was named from the Baugo Creek, which is derived from the Indian name Baubaugo, meaning "devil river".

== Geography ==
According to the 2010 census, the township has a total area of 15.01 square miles (38.9 km^{2}), of which 14.69 square miles (38.0 km^{2}) (or 97.87%) is land and 0.32 square miles (0.83 km^{2}) (or 2.13%) is water.

=== Cities and towns ===
- Elkhart (southwest edge)

=== Adjacent townships ===
- Cleveland Township (north)
- Concord Township (east)
- Harrison Township (southeast)
- Olive Township (south)
- Penn Township, St. Joseph County (west)

=== Major highways ===
- US 20
- SR 19

=== Cemeteries ===
The township contains three cemeteries: Noffsinger, Osceola and Saint Vincent Depaul.
