= Elkhart Community Schools =

School district in Indiana, USA

Address
- 2720 California Rd Elkhart, Elkhart County, Indiana, 46514; United States
- Coordinates: 41.6953°N 86.0138°W

District information
- Type: Public
- Grades: Pre-K through 12
- Superintendent: Dr. Larry Huff
- Schools: 13 Elementary, 3 Middle, 1 High, 1 Alternative, 1 Career center
- Budget: $152.9 million
- NCES District ID: 1803270

Students and staff
- Students: ~11,320
- Teachers: 706
- Staff: 923
- Student–teacher ratio: 16.03

Other information
- Website: www.elkhart.k12.in.us

Elkhart Community Schools is a school district headquartered in Elkhart, Indiana.

The district serves most of Elkhart as well as Bristol and Simonton Lake.

As of 2016 it had about 13,000 students.

== Schools ==
High schools (Grades: 9 - 12):

- Elkhart High School - Main Campus (Formerly Elkhart Memorial High School)
- Elkhart High School - Freshman Division (Formerly Elkhart Central High School)
- Elkhart Area Career Center

Middle schools (Grades: 6 - 8):

- Pierre Moran Middle School
- North Side Middle School
- West Side Middle School

Elementary schools (Grades: K - 5):

- Beardsley
- Mary Beck
- Cleveland
- Mary Daly
- Eastwood
- Mary Feeser
- Pinewood
- Riverview
- Roosevelt

== Food Program ==
The Elkhart Schools have partnered with South Bend-based food rescue non-profit Cultivate, to reuse food slated to be discarded by the schools and repurposing them into meals for students in need.
