= Elkhart County 4-H Fair =

County fair in Goshen, Indiana, U.S.

Coordinates: 41.57815°N 85.803702°W

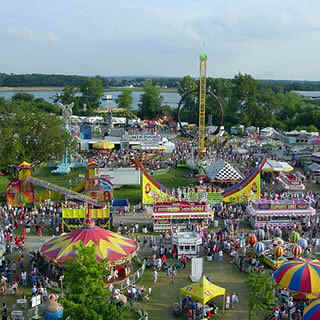
- Elkhart County 4-H Fair Carnival
- Genre: Annual fair
- Begins: 24 July 2026
- Ends: 1 August 2026
- Frequency: Annual
- Location: Goshen, Indiana
- Years active: 1851–1916; 1919–41; 1946–2019; 2021–present
- Inaugurated: 1851
- Previous event: 18-26 July 2025
- Attendance: 202,560 (2017)
- Budget: US$2,104,700 (2010)
- Website: www.4hfair.org

The Elkhart County 4-H Fair is conducted annually in Goshen, Indiana and is one of the largest county fairs in the country. In 2017, 202,560 guests visited the Fair during the 9 day event. The Elkhart County 4-H Fair is known for its grandstand entertainment and concerts. Over 4000 Elkhart county youth are involved in 4-H, displaying 8000 projects at the Fair annually.

== History ==
The Elkhart County 4-H Fair started in 1851 on Goshen, Indiana's courthouse square. Its goal was to give local farmers a place to learn about new farming techniques and a chance to compete for excellence in farming. During the American Civil War, the fair had to take a small break. Soon after, the fair looked for new ways to get urban dwellers interested in the fair resulting in more profit. In the early 1870s attendance skyrocketed when baseball games, sideshow performers, and horse races became the popular attractions at the fair. Twenty years later the County Fair featured a festival ride and merry-go-round, which became the fair's midway.

No fair was held in 1917–18 because of World War I, 1942–45 because of World War II & 2020 due to the COVID-19 pandemic.

== The Elkhart County 4-H Fairgrounds ==
The Elkhart County Fairgrounds hosts over 150 events during year when the Fair is not being held. The fairgrounds consists of 384 acres (1.55 km^{2}) with 70 buildings and over 300 permanent RV sites in addition to 600 temporary RV sites. One of the most popular non-fair events are RV travel rallies. In 2017, 12 RV travel rallies were hosted at the fairgrounds. In 2011, the fair board completed the purchase of an additional 253 acres (1.02 km^{2}) to the east of the existing fairgrounds. Planners are considering the use of the land for additional parking, camping, or exhibit space.

The Elkhart County 4-H fair has been widely regarded as one of the best county fairs in the nation. When the fair is not in season, the fairgrounds stays busy with other events including the RV Rallies, Michiana Mennonite Relief Sale and is a year-round public campground.

== The Elkhart County 4-H Fair Week ==
=== Attendance ===
Elkhart County 4-H Fair Attendance: 2009: 258,832; 2010: 255,315; 2011: 235,495; 2012: 244,883; 2013: 280,175; 2014: 269,064; 2015: 255,253; 2016: 183,461; 2017: 202,560; 2018: 196,131; 2019 183,646; 2021 187,545; 2022 185,304; 2023 216,964; 2024 192,839;

Attendance by Year
Year	Attendance
2009	258,832
2010	255,315
2011	235,495
2012	244,883
2013	280,175
2014	269,064
2015	255,253
2016	183,461
2017	202,560
2018	196,131
2019	183,646
2021	187,545
2022	185,304
2023	216,964
2024	192,839

=== The 4-H Fair Week Grandstand Events ===
- On the first Friday of the fair, the fair officially opens with a traditional ribbon cutting. $5 First Friday - Fair admission is only $5 and many $5 food specials are available all day. Senior Queen Contest is held on the Park Stage later in the evening. The evening then wraps up with the Elkhart County 4-H Fair Queen Contest where 50 young women compete for the title.
- On Saturday the Harness racing takes place in the early afternoon and the evening ends with a concert featuring a popular singing group, band or artist.
- On Sunday of the fair, also known as Family Day, no fair admission is charged. The famous Elkhart County 4-H Fair Parade goes past the grandstands in the afternoon. Highlighting the parade is the "parade 5000", in which hundreds of Indiana's runners come here for the win. Later in the evening, a popular featured Christian singing group or band plays at the grandstands.
- On Monday, Disabilities Awareness Day with another popular singing group, band, or artist.
- On Tuesday, also known as Senior Citizens Day, more Harness racing takes place for most of the day and the day ends again with another popular singing group, band, or artist.
- On Wednesday, also known as Kid's Day, the grandstands don't feature any events until another popular singing group, band, or artist performs that evening.
- On Thursday, the Tractor pulls compete all day long featuring different classes of tractors including antique tractors and Lucas Oil PPL Tractors.
- On Friday the Rodeo takes place all day long with a second rodeo in the evening. Noche Latina is celebrated in Heritage Park under the clock tower.
- On Saturday, the last day of the Elkhart County 4-H Fair, the classic car cruise-in takes place in the infield during the day and the Demolition Derby ends the fair week.

There are approximately 600 volunteers for the Elkhart County 4-H Fair. The entire fair board is volunteer and sometimes fair board and other volunteers take a weeks vacation to volunteer their time.

== Future fair dates ==
- July 24- August 1, 2026
- July 23-31, 2027
