= Elkhart Memorial High School =

Location
- 2608 California Road; Elkhart, Indiana 46514; United States; 41°41′47″N 86°00′52″W

Information
- Type: Public
- Established: 1972
- School district: Elkhart Community Schools
- Faculty: 99.35 (FTE)
- Grades: 9–12
- Enrollment: 1,604 (2018-19)
- Student to teacher ratio: 16.14
- Colors: Crimson and gold
- Mascot: Chargers
- Rival: Elkhart Central High School (Closed 2020)
- Created: When Elkhart High School (est. 1972) was split into Elkhart Memorial High School and Elkhart Central High School
- Website: Official website

Elkhart Memorial High School (EMHS) was a public high school located in Elkhart, Indiana. It was formerly part of Elkhart Community Schools.

== History ==
The building was designed and built by Everett I. Brown and Company of Indianapolis. It was built to accommodate a schedule and curriculum organized around modular periods. Accordingly, the building features lecture halls, seminar rooms, and departmental office areas.

Elkhart Memorial High School opened its doors to students in 1972 when Elkhart High School was split into Elkhart Memorial High School and Elkhart Central High School. Elkhart Memorial was given the colors Crimson and Gold and the "Crimson Charger" mascot, along with a new school song. The school was named in tribute to the many Elkhart students who have served their city, state, and country. Dedication ceremonies were held on October 28, 1972. The school received a Special First Class Commission by the state of Indiana. On March 30, 1973, the school became a fully accredited member of the North Central Association of Colleges of Schools. Until 1984, Elkhart Memorial only enrolled students grades 10 through 12. In 1985, ninth grade students were added, resulting in the remodeling of the library and additional classroom space.

A 14 million dollar project was designed by Fanning/Howey Associates, Inc. in March 1998 to add 16 classrooms, additional office space, new industrial technology laboratories and an additional gym. The entire project expanded the school to 426,256 square feet (39,600.5 m^{2}). As part of the remodeling, every classroom was wired for voice, video, and data.

Currently, Elkhart Memorial High School has 65 classrooms. The school also has 8 computer labs, 11 science labs with adjoining classrooms, 4 lecture halls, a computerized writing lab, family and consumer sciences lab areas, and industrial technology lab facilities. The industrial technology areas offer students modular stations for applied learning in the following areas: plastics, robotics, CNC machining, hydraulics and pneumatics, aerodynamics, motor circuitry, lasers, electronics, mechanical and architectural drafting, manufacturing systems, constructing systems, video editing, and computer assembly.

Beginning in the fall of 2020, the mascot for the ‘new’ Elkhart High School will be the Lions, merging the athletics programs of the current Elkhart Central and Elkhart Memorial High Schools. A new school song has been selected as well.

In the fall of 2020, the Elkhart Memorial High School building will be known as Elkhart High School - West Campus, in preparation for a recombination with the current Elkhart Central High School (East Campus, fall 2020) in the fall of 2021. At that time, the several buildings on the current Elkhart Memorial High School campus will house all students grades 10-12 of the reconstituted Elkhart High School. Ninth grade students will be housed in several buildings on the current/former Elkhart Central High School campus near downtown Elkhart.

== Elkhart Memorial Athletics ==
All Elkhart Memorial sports are played in the Northern Lakes Conference since the winter of 2000 after competing in the Northern Indiana Conference since 1972. All sports are played in the Indiana 4A classification except for football, which is 5A.

After many years playing "home" football games across town at Rice Field (on the Elkhart Central High School campus), Charger Field was constructed at EMHS and opened in August 2002 with grandstands that can seat 4,420 fans, a press box, concession buildings, and gateways, thus giving Elkhart Memorial High School its first true home football field in its history.

=== Boys' sports ===
Football, golf, soccer, cross country, swimming and diving, wrestling, basketball, baseball, tennis, track and field.

=== Girls' sports ===
Cheerleading, cross country, softball, basketball, track and field, golf, soccer, swimming & diving, tennis, volleyball.

== See also ==
- List of high schools in Indiana
