= Elkhart River =

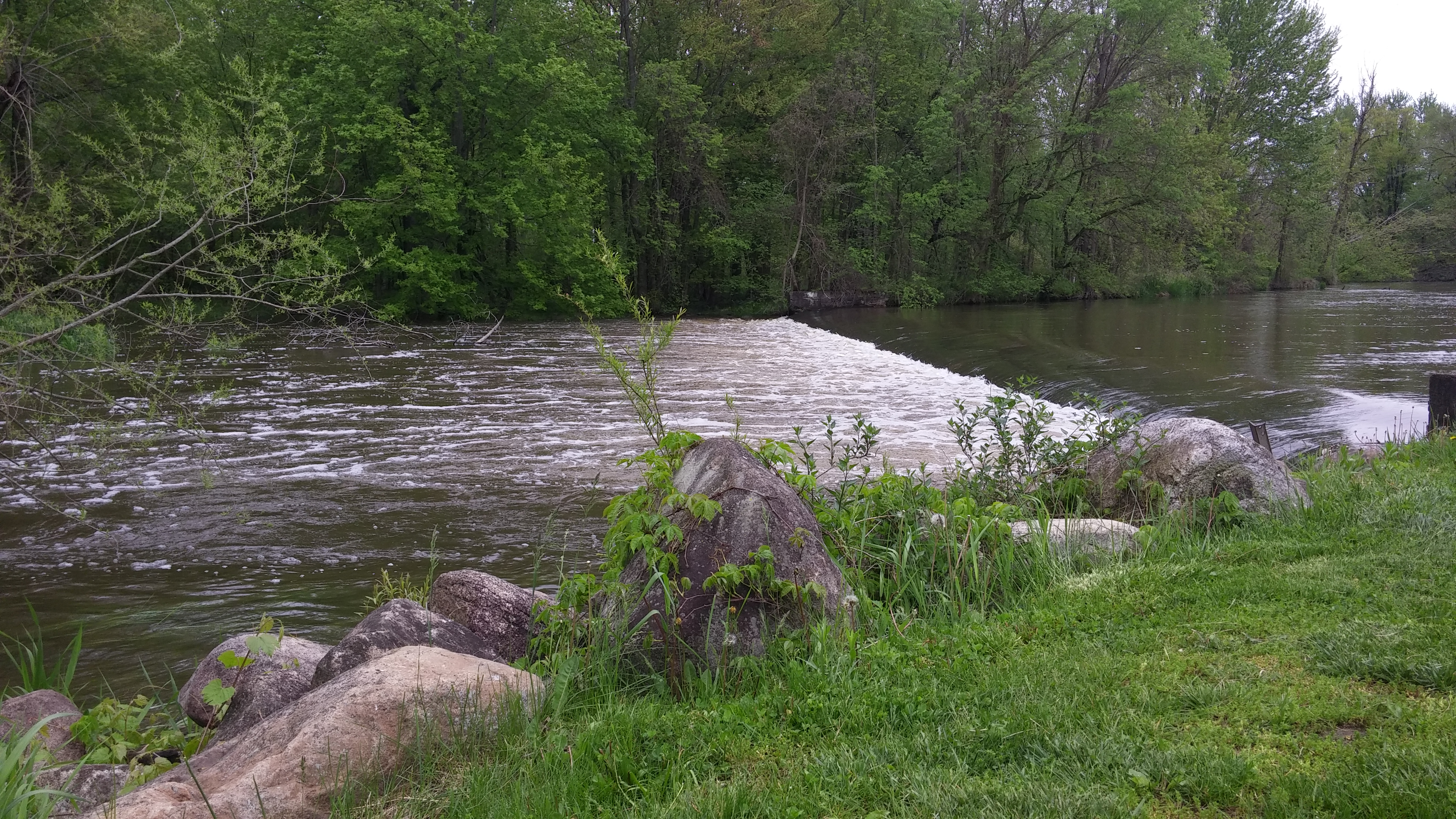

Physical characteristics
- Source
  - location: Confluence of the North and South Branches of Elkhart River west of Wawaka, Indiana
  - coordinates: 41°27′37″N 85°31′51″W
  - elevation: 872 ft (266 m)
- Mouth
  - location: Confluence with the St. Joseph River at Elkhart, Indiana
  - coordinates: 41°41′30″N 85°58′20″W
  - elevation: 722 ft (220 m)
- Length: 48 mi (77 km)

Basin features
- Progression: Elkhart River → St. Joseph River → Lake Michigan → Great Lakes → St. Lawrence River → Gulf of St. Lawrence
- GNIS ID: 434081

The Elkhart River is a 48.3-mile-long (77.7 km) tributary of the St. Joseph River in northern Indiana in the United States. It is almost entirely contained in Elkhart County. It begins as the South Branch Elkhart River from Port Mitchell Lake and the North Branch Elkhart River from Waldron Lake and merge to form the Elkhart River west of Wawaka, Indiana. It flows generally westward through Benton and then turns northward. It then flows through Baintertown and Waterford Mills into the Goshen Dam Pond. From there it flows northwest through Goshen, Dunlap and Elkhart. It flows into the St. Joseph River at Island Park just north of downtown Elkhart.

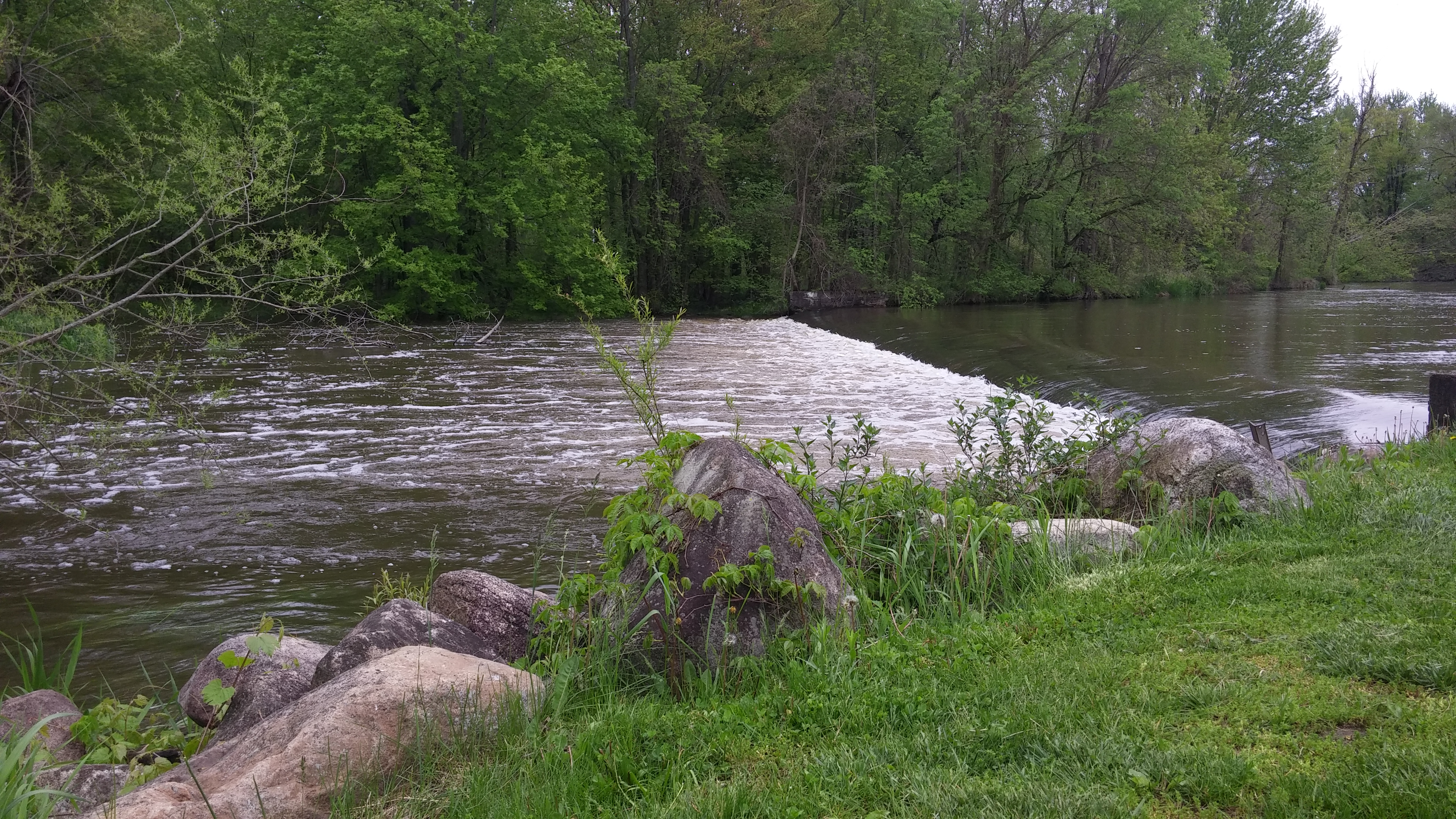
The Elkhart River at Baintertown Park

== See also ==
- List of rivers of Indiana
