= Amish Acres Arts & Crafts Festival =

Cultural festival in Nappanee, Indiana

The Amish Acres Arts & Crafts Festival, held the first weekend in August (Thursday through Sunday, 05–8 August 2021, subject to cancellation brought on by the COVID-19 pandemic) in Nappanee, Indiana, celebrated 63 years in 2022. It features 350 artists and craftsmen in a marketplace surrounding the farm's pond. Over $10,000 in cash prizes are awarded winners in twelve categories. Four full days of entertainment on four stages, musical theatre, guided tours, wagon rides, and popular awards highlight the event. The festival is one of the American Bus Association's Top 100 Events in North America in 2003, 2006, plus 2008 and the 7th Best Traditional Crafts Festival in the United States according to Sunshine Artist magazine. Over 70,000 visitors attend the event.

== History ==
The festival began in 1962 in front of the Pletcher Furniture Village in downtown Nappanee as part of a sidewalk days celebration. Watercolors painted by local students in the park department's summer arts program were hung on clotheslines between the pillars of the store. The event quickly grew to include artists and craftsmen displaying and selling their wares in booths. The event soon spread to several blocks and alleys surrounding the furniture store. Visitors soon demanded Amish-related products including smoked hams, jams, jellies, and baked goods. A converted school bus was used to tour the surrounding countryside. The Pletcher family founded Amish Acres in 1968 partly from this market study in miniature. The festival was moved to the historic farm in 1971 and rapidly expanded to surround the farm's pond.

Due to COVID-19 pandemic restrictions, 2020 saw no concerts nor shows due to COVID-19. Since that year, strict measures are undertaken, such as wearing masks and social distancing.
