= Elkhart Central High School =

Public secondary school in Elkhart, Indiana, United States

Location
- One Blazer Boulevard; Elkhart, Indiana 46516; United States; 41°41′05″N 85°57′31″W

Information
- Type: Public Secondary
- Established: 1972
- Closed: 2020
- School district: Elkhart Community Schools
- Grades: 9–12
- Enrollment: 1,641 (2019-2020)
- Color
- Mascot: Mr. B
- Team name: Blue Blazers
- Rival: Elkhart Memorial (closed 2020)
- Website: Official Website

Elkhart Central High School (ECHS) was a public secondary school in Elkhart, Indiana. It was a part of Elkhart Community Schools.

== History ==
In the fall of 1972 when Elkhart High School (est. 1872) was split into Elkhart Memorial High School and Elkhart Central High School, the former Elkhart High School building was renamed Elkhart Central High School and, according to the school board minutes, was to continue the traditions ("Blue Blazer" mascot, school colors, accomplishments, the original 1910 charter issued by the North Central Association and the fight song) of the old Elkhart High School. The Elkhart Central High School building was designed and built by Everett I. Brown and Company of Indianapolis and opened in 1966. It was built to accommodate a schedule and curriculum organized around modular periods. Accordingly, the building features lecture halls, seminar rooms, and departmental office areas. Until 1984, Elkhart Central enrolled only 10th, 11th, and 12th grade students. In 1985, 9th graders were added, with the remodeling of the library and additional classroom space. A 16 million dollar addition and renovation project was designed by Fanning/Howey Associates, Inc. in March 1997 to add 16 classrooms, additional office space, new industrial technology laboratories, and a new media center. The entire project expanded the school to approximately 400,000 square feet (37,000 m^{2}). The "new" building dedication ceremonies were held in the fall of 2000. As part of the remodeling, every classroom was wired and equipped for voice, video, and data. For a time, the student-run news show, "NewsCenter," was broadcast with the daily announcements and news.

Other major construction milestones: in 1969 a swimming pool; in 1982 an additional gym, called the "New Gym" or "East Gym"; in 1995 the fieldhouse at Rice Field was doubled in size along with the re-crowning/sodding of the football playing field. The Ronzone track was resurfaced in 1995 and improved again in 2010.

In the fall of 2020, the Elkhart Central name was retired, and for one year the Elkhart Central building housed Elkhart High School, East Campus. The athletics programs of the former Elkhart Central High School and Elkhart Memorial High School merged into one, with a new mascot (Lions), school colors (blue and gold), and new fight song.

In the fall of 2021, the system underwent a change where students in grades 10 through 12 will attend classes on California Road at the former Elkhart Memorial (west campus)and Elkhart Area Career Center buildings, with the addition of new music rehearsal space and a new building to house technology programs. Elkhart High School was divided into five Schools of Study to better prepare students for post-high school careers. Students in grade 9 attend classes at the former Elkhart Central High School (Known as the Freshman Division) on Blazer Boulevard.

== Demographics ==
The demographic breakdown of the 1,641 students enrolled in 2019-2020 was:

- Asian - 0.7%
- Black - 12.2%
- Hispanic - 41.4%
- White - 38.5%
- Multiracial - 7.2%

59.2% of the students were eligible for free or reduced-cost lunch. For 2019–2020, Elkhart Central was a Title I school.

== Notable alumni ==
- Lindsay Benko – gold medalist Olympic swimmer
- Jean Hagen – Academy Award and Emmy Award-nominated actress
- David Heath – probabilist who became world-famous for developing Heath–Jarrow–Morton framework to model evolution of interest rate curve
- Curtis Hill – 43rd Attorney General of Indiana
- Ben Larson – college basketball player
- Rodney McGraw – defensive end for the Miami Dolphins of the National Football League
- Alec Purdie – midfielder for MLS's New England Revolution
- Nathan Palmer – wide receiver for the NFL's Chicago Bears
- Clare Randolph – center for the NFL's Chicago Cardinals & Detroit Lions
- Dave Schnell – quarterback for the Indiana Hoosiers
- Shafer Suggs – former NFL player with the New York Jets
- Tanner Tully - Major League Baseball pitcher
- Rich Wingo – former NFL player with the Green Bay Packers

== Athletics ==
Elkhart Central was a member of the Northern Indiana Conference and competed as a class 4A school, except in football where they competed in class 5A. The school colors were blue & white.

=== State championships ===
- Boys Wrestling 1968^
- Football 1963, 1968 & 1970^
- Boys Cross Country 1973–1974
- Boys Golf 1978–1979
- Boys Track & Field 1969^,1992–1993
- Boys Baseball 2013

^ As Elkhart High School, see note above, EHS continues as ECHS

== See also ==
- List of high schools in Indiana
