= Osolo Township, Elkhart County, Indiana =

Osolo Township
- Township
- Location of Osolo Township in Elkhart County
- Coordinates: 41°43′27″N 85°56′46″W
- Country: United States
- State: Indiana
- County: Elkhart

Government
  - Type: Indiana township

Area
  - Total: 26.02 sq mi (67.4 km^{2})
  - Land: 25 sq mi (65 km^{2})
  - Water: 1.02 sq mi (2.6 km^{2})
- Elevation: 768 ft (234 m)

Population (2020)
  - Total: 28,769
  - Density: 1,121.3/sq mi (432.9/km^{2})
- FIPS code: 18-57150
- GNIS feature ID: 453696

Osolo Township is one of sixteen townships in Elkhart County, Indiana. As of the 2010 census, its population was 28,032.

== History ==
Osolo Township was organized in 1838.

== Geography ==
According to the 2010 census, the township has a total area of 26.02 square miles (67.4 km^{2}), of which 25 square miles (65 km^{2}) (or 96.08%) is land and 1.02 square miles (2.6 km^{2}) (or 3.92%) is water.

=== Cities and towns ===
- Elkhart (north quarter)
- Simonton Lake

=== Unincorporated towns ===
- East Lake Estates
- Garden Village
- Greenleaf Manor

(This list is based on USGS data and may include former settlements.)

=== Major highways ===
- I-80
- I-90
- Indiana Toll Road
- SR 19
