= Union Township, Elkhart County, Indiana =

Union Township
- Township
- Location of Union Township in Elkhart County
- Coordinates: 41°28′33″N 85°56′20″W
- Country: United States
- State: Indiana
- County: Elkhart

Government
  - Type: Indiana township

Area
  - Total: 35.92 sq mi (93.0 km^{2})
  - Land: 35.92 sq mi (93.0 km^{2})
  - Water: 0 sq mi (0 km^{2})
- Elevation: 863 ft (263 m)

Population (2020)
  - Total: 6,250
  - Density: 170.7/sq mi (65.9/km^{2})
- FIPS code: 18-77264
- GNIS feature ID: 453914

Union Township is one of sixteen townships in Elkhart County, Indiana. As of the 2010 census, its population was 6,134.

== History ==
Union Township was organized in 1837.

== Geography ==
According to the 2010 census, the township has a total area of 35.92 square miles (93.0 km^{2}), all land.

=== Cities and towns ===
- Nappanee (east half)

=== Unincorporated communities ===
- Foraker
- Gravelton

(This list is based on USGS data and may include former settlements.)

=== Adjacent townships ===
- Harrison Township (north)
- Elkhart Township (northeast)
- Jackson Township (east)
- Van Buren Township, Kosciusko County (southeast)
- Jefferson Township, Kosciusko County (south)
- Scott Township, Kosciusko County (southwest)
- Locke Township (west)
- Olive Township (northwest)

=== Major highways ===
- US 6
- SR 19
- SR 119

=== Cemetery ===
The township contains one cemetery, Bull.
