= Concord Community Schools (Indiana) =

School district in Indiana

Concord Community Schools is a public school district headquartered in Dunlap in Elkhart County, Indiana.

The district serves approximately 5,400 students in grades K-12 at seven buildings.

== Schools ==
- Concord High School
- Concord Junior High School
- Concord Intermediate School
- Concord East Side Elementary
- Concord Ox Bow Elementary
- Concord South Side Elementary
- Concord West Side Elementary
