= Baugo Community Schools =

School district in Indiana, United States

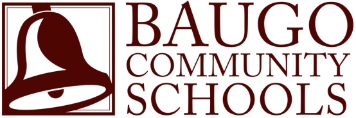

Location
- Elkhart Northern Indiana United States

District information
- Type: Public
- Motto: Small school feel ~ World class education
- Grades: K-12
- Superintendent: Byron Sanders
- Schools: Jimtown High School; Jimtown Junior High School; Jimtown Intermediate School; Jimtown Elementary School
- NCES District ID: 1800420

Students and staff
- Athletic conference: Northern State Conference (NSC)

Other information
- Website: www.baugo.org

Baugo Community Schools (commonly referred to as Jimtown) is a school district located in Elkhart, Northern Indiana, in the United States. The district is composed of four schools: Jimtown Elementary (K–2), Jimtown Intermediate (3–6), Jimtown Junior High School (7–8), and Jimtown High School (9–12).

Approximately 1,900 students attend Baugo Community Schools and is run by the Baugo Community School Corporation.
