= Southwest, Indiana =

- Unincorporated community
- Location within Indiana Location within the United States
- Coordinates: 41°32′12″N 85°56′38″W
- Country: United States
- State: Indiana
- County: Elkhart
- Township: Harrison
- Elevation: 856 ft (261 m)
- ZIP code: 46526
- FIPS code: 18-71594
- GNIS feature ID: 443890

Southwest is an unincorporated community in Harrison Township, Elkhart County, Indiana.

== History ==
A post office opened in Southwest in 1854, and remained in operation until it was discontinued in 1901. Southwest lies southwest of the county seat, hence the name.

In 1905, Southwest contained a general store, a brick schoolhouse, three churches, and 12 families.
