= Elkhart Township, Elkhart County, Indiana =

Elkhart Township
- Township
- Location of Elkhart Township in Elkhart County
- Coordinates: 41°33′59″N 85°49′41″W
- Country: United States
- State: Indiana
- County: Elkhart

Government
  - Type: Indiana township

Area
  - Total: 35.69 sq mi (92.4 km^{2})
  - Land: 35.04 sq mi (90.8 km^{2})
  - Water: 0.65 sq mi (1.7 km^{2})
- Elevation: 804 ft (245 m)

Population (2020)
  - Total: 38,388
  - Density: 1,041.2/sq mi (402.0/km^{2})
- FIPS code: 18-20746
- GNIS feature ID: 453275

Elkhart Township is one of sixteen townships in Elkhart County, Indiana. As of the 2010 census, its population was 36,487.

== History ==
The Dierdorff Farmstead was listed on the National Register of Historic Places in 2011.

== Geography ==
According to the 2010 census, the township has a total area of 35.69 square miles (92.4 km^{2}), of which 35.04 square miles (90.8 km^{2}) (or 98.18%) is land and 0.65 square miles (1.7 km^{2}) (or 1.82%) is water.

=== Cities and towns ===
- Goshen (vast majority)

=== Unincorporated towns ===
- Waterford Mills

=== Adjacent townships ===
- Jefferson Township (north)
- Middlebury Township (northeast)
- Clinton Township (east)
- Benton Township (southeast)
- Jackson Township (south)
- Union Township (southwest)
- Harrison Township (west)
- Concord Township (northwest)

=== Major highways ===
- US 33
- SR 4
- SR 15
- SR 119

=== Cemeteries ===
The township contains seven cemeteries: Cripe, Elkhart Prairie, Hess, Oak Ridge, Sparklin, Studebaker and Violett.

== Education ==
Elkhart Township residents may obtain a library card at the Goshen Public Library in Goshen.
