= Jackson Township, Elkhart County, Indiana =

Jackson Township
- Township
- Location of Jackson Township in Elkhart County
- Coordinates: 41°29′N 85°50′W
- Country: United States
- State: Indiana
- County: Elkhart

Government
  - Type: Indiana township

Area
  - Total: 36.35 sq mi (94.1 km^{2})
  - Land: 36.29 sq mi (94.0 km^{2})
  - Water: 0.06 sq mi (0.16 km^{2})
- Elevation: 827 ft (252 m)

Population (2020)
  - Total: 4,996
  - Density: 118.1/sq mi (45.6/km^{2})
- FIPS code: 18-36972
- GNIS feature ID: 453442

Jackson Township (T35N R6E) is one of sixteen townships in Elkhart County, Indiana. As of the 2010 census, its population was 4,288.

== History ==
Jackson Township was named for Col. John Jackson, a pioneer settler.

== Geography ==
According to the 2010 census, the township has a total area of 36.35 square miles (94.1 km^{2}), of which 36.29 square miles (94.0 km^{2}) (or 99.83%) is land and 0.06 square miles (0.16 km^{2}) (or 0.17%) is water. Frog Pond is in this township.

=== Cities and towns ===
- New Paris

=== Unincorporated towns ===
- Bainter Town

=== Adjacent townships ===
- Elkhart Township (north)
- Clinton Township (northeast)
- Benton Township (east)
- Turkey Creek Township, Kosciusko County (southeast)
- Van Buren Township, Kosciusko County (south)
- Jefferson Township, Kosciusko County (southwest)
- Union Township (west)
- Harrison Township (northwest)

=== Major highways ===
- US 6
- US 33
- SR 15

=== Cemeteries ===
The township contains several cemeteries, including the historic Bainter Town cemetery, which opened in 1832.
