= Simonton Lake, Indiana =

- Census-designated place
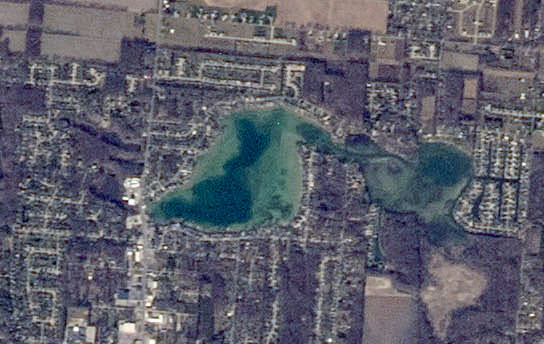
- Simonton Lake seen from ISS

- Location of Simonton Lake in Elkhart County, Indiana.
- Coordinates: 41°45′05″N 85°57′57″W
- Country: United States
- State: Indiana
- County: Elkhart

Area
  - Total: 3.98 sq mi (10.31 km^{2})
  - Land: 3.51 sq mi (9.09 km^{2})
  - Water: 0.47 sq mi (1.22 km^{2})
- Elevation: 771 ft (235 m)

Population (2020)
  - Total: 4,710
  - Density: 1,341.6/sq mi (517.98/km^{2})
- Time zone: UTC-5 (Eastern (EST))
  - Summer (DST): UTC-4 (EDT)
- ZIP code: 46514
- Area code: 574
- FIPS code: 18-69840
- GNIS feature ID: 2393237

Simonton Lake is a census-designated place (CDP) in Elkhart County, Indiana, United States. As of the 2020 census, Simonton Lake had a population of 4,710.

== History ==
The community takes its name from the lake. Simonton Lake was named for Samuel Simonton, a 19th-century farmer.

== Geography ==
According to the United States Census Bureau, the CDP has a total area of 4.1 square miles (10.5 km^{2}), of which 3.6 square miles (9.2 km^{2}) is land and 0.46 square miles (1.2 km^{2}), or 11.68%, is water.

== Demographics ==
Historical population
Census	Pop.	Note	%±
2020	4,710		—
U.S. Decennial Census

=== 2020 census ===
As of the 2020 census, Simonton Lake had a population of 4,710. The median age was 44.5 years. 21.6% of residents were under the age of 18 and 20.6% of residents were 65 years of age or older. For every 100 females there were 101.1 males, and for every 100 females age 18 and over there were 96.8 males age 18 and over.

98.9% of residents lived in urban areas, while 1.1% lived in rural areas.

There were 1,902 households in Simonton Lake, of which 29.1% had children under the age of 18 living in them. Of all households, 51.8% were married-couple households, 17.0% were households with a male householder and no spouse or partner present, and 23.1% were households with a female householder and no spouse or partner present. About 24.1% of all households were made up of individuals and 10.6% had someone living alone who was 65 years of age or older.

There were 2,041 housing units, of which 6.8% were vacant. The homeowner vacancy rate was 1.7% and the rental vacancy rate was 7.8%.

Racial composition as of the 2020 census
Race	Number	Percent
White	3,699	78.5%
Black or African American	313	6.6%
American Indian and Alaska Native	24	0.5%
Asian	126	2.7%
Native Hawaiian and Other Pacific Islander	1	0.0%
Some other race	161	3.4%
Two or more races	386	8.2%
Hispanic or Latino (of any race)	413	8.8%

=== 2000 census ===
As of the 2000 census, there were 4,053 people, 1,567 households, and 1,181 families residing in the CDP. The population density was 1,243.0 inhabitants per square mile (479.9/km^{2}). There were 1,636 housing units at an average density of 501.7 per square mile (193.7/km^{2}). The racial makeup of the CDP was 94.77% White, 1.63% African American, 0.25% Native American, 1.55% Asian, 0.64% from other races, and 1.16% from two or more races. Hispanic or Latino of any race were 2.52% of the population.

There were 1,567 households, out of which 31.8% had children under the age of 18 living with them, 64.2% were married couples living together, 7.4% had a female householder with no husband present, and 24.6% were non-families. 19.5% of all households were made up of individuals, and 6.6% had someone living alone who was 65 years of age or older. The average household size was 2.59 and the average family size was 2.96.

In the CDP, the population was spread out, with 24.6% under the age of 18, 6.4% from 18 to 24, 28.4% from 25 to 44, 28.7% from 45 to 64, and 11.9% who were 65 years of age or older. The median age was 39 years. For every 100 females, there were 100.0 males. For every 100 females age 18 and over, there were 98.8 males.

The median income for a household in the CDP was $56,539, and the median income for a family was $58,359. Males had a median income of $41,688 versus $26,901 for females. The per capita income for the CDP was $27,327. About 2.4% of families and 2.8% of the population were below the poverty line, including 0.8% of those under age 18 and 3.1% of those age 65 or over.

== Education ==
It is served by Elkhart Community Schools.
