= Dunlap, Indiana =

- Census-designated place
- Location of Dunlap in Elkhart County, Indiana.
- Coordinates: 41°37′40″N 85°55′12″W
- Country: United States
- State: Indiana
- County: Elkhart

Area
  - Total: 4.93 sq mi (12.76 km^{2})
  - Land: 4.92 sq mi (12.74 km^{2})
  - Water: 0.012 sq mi (0.03 km^{2})
- Elevation: 778 ft (237 m)

Population (2020)
  - Total: 6,442
  - Density: 1,310.1/sq mi (505.84/km^{2})
- Time zone: UTC-5 (Eastern (EST))
  - Summer (DST): UTC-4 (EDT)
- ZIP code: 46517, 46516, 46526
- Area code: 574
- FIPS code: 18-19072
- GNIS feature ID: 2392982

Dunlap is a census-designated place (CDP) in Elkhart County, Indiana, United States. As of the 2020 census, Dunlap had a population of 6,442. Once a small farming community, by the 1980s it had become a suburb of Elkhart and Goshen, Indiana. Most of the town was destroyed by two violent F4 tornadoes during the Palm Sunday Tornado Outbreak on April 11, 1965.

== History ==
A post office was established at Dunlap in 1886, and remained in operation until it was discontinued in 1902.

On Palm Sunday 1965, deadly twin tornadoes would hit the Dunlap area, specifically the Sunnyside subdivision and the Midway Trailer Park. The tornadoes would end up Killing a combined total of 67 and injuring a combined total of 573. Days later, President Lyndon B. Johnson would end up visiting Dunlap. Both tornadoes would be given a rating of F4

== Geography ==
According to the United States Census Bureau, the CDP has a total area of 4.9 square miles (12.7 km^{2}), of which 0.20% is water.

== Demographics ==
Historical population
Census	Pop.	Note	%±
2020	6,442		—
U.S. Decennial Census

=== 2020 census ===
As of the 2020 census, Dunlap had a population of 6,442. The median age was 38.2 years. 26.7% of residents were under the age of 18 and 13.8% of residents were 65 years of age or older. For every 100 females there were 97.1 males, and for every 100 females age 18 and over there were 97.4 males age 18 and over.

98.5% of residents lived in urban areas, while 1.5% lived in rural areas.

There were 2,227 households in Dunlap, of which 37.0% had children under the age of 18 living in them. Of all households, 60.8% were married-couple households, 14.6% were households with a male householder and no spouse or partner present, and 19.3% were households with a female householder and no spouse or partner present. About 18.3% of all households were made up of individuals and 9.0% had someone living alone who was 65 years of age or older.

There were 2,320 housing units, of which 4.0% were vacant. The homeowner vacancy rate was 0.6% and the rental vacancy rate was 12.6%.

Racial composition as of the 2020 census
Race	Number	Percent
White	4,879	75.7%
Black or African American	164	2.5%
American Indian and Alaska Native	42	0.7%
Asian	68	1.1%
Native Hawaiian and Other Pacific Islander	3	0.0%
Some other race	629	9.8%
Two or more races	657	10.2%
Hispanic or Latino (of any race)	1,254	19.5%

=== 2000 census ===
As of the census of 2000, there were 5,887 people, 2,087 households, and 1,657 families residing in the CDP. The population density was 1,390.4 inhabitants per square mile (536.8/km^{2}). There were 2,147 housing units at an average density of 507.1 per square mile (195.8/km^{2}). The racial makeup of the CDP was 91.69% White, 2.87% African American, 0.17% Native American, 0.93% Asian, 0.10% Pacific Islander, 3.04% from other races, and 1.19% from two or more races. Hispanic or Latino of any race were 4.65% of the population.

There were 2,087 households, out of which 37.2% had children under the age of 18 living with them, 66.3% were married couples living together, 9.5% had a female householder with no husband present, and 20.6% were non-families. 16.6% of all households were made up of individuals, and 7.2% had someone living alone who was 65 years of age or older. The average household size was 2.82 and the average family size was 3.16.

In the CDP, the population was spread out, with 28.8% under the age of 18, 7.3% from 18 to 24, 28.1% from 25 to 44, 25.6% from 45 to 64, and 10.1% who were 65 years of age or older. The median age was 37 years. For every 100 females, there were 96.7 males. For every 100 females age 18 and over, there were 91.9 males.

The median income for a household in the CDP was $52,083, and the median income for a family was $55,522. Males had a median income of $40,802 versus $25,500 for females. The per capita income for the CDP was $19,733. About 5.0% of families and 6.1% of the population were below the poverty line, including 8.1% of those under age 18 and 6.4% of those age 65 or over.

== Education ==
Dunlap is served by Concord Community Schools, including Concord High School.

The community has a public library, a branch of the Elkhart Public Library.

== Transportation ==
The Interurban Trolley Concord and Elkhart-Goshen routes run through Dunlap, connecting the town to the nearby cities Elkhart and Goshen.
