= Indiana State Road 19 =

Highway in Indiana

State Road 19
- SR 19 highlighted in red

Route information
- Maintained by INDOT
- Length: 143 mi (230 km)
- Existed: October 1, 1926–present

Major junctions
- South end: SR 32 / SR 38 in Noblesville
- North end: Old M-205 at Michigan state line near Simonton Lake

Location
- Country: United States
- State: Indiana
- Counties: Elkhart, Fulton, Hamilton, Howard, Kosciusko, Miami, Tipton

Highway system
- Indiana State Highway System; Interstate; US; State; Scenic
← SR 18	→ US 20

State Road 19 (SR 19) is a route on the Indiana State Highway System that runs between Noblesville and Elkhart in the US state of Indiana. The 143 miles (230.14 km) of Indiana SR 19 serve as a minor highway. One segment of the highway is listed on the National Highway System. Various sections are urban four-lane highway and rural two-lane highway. The highway passes through farmland, residential and commercial properties. The northernmost community along the highway is Simonton Lake at the Michigan state line.

SR 19 was first designated as U.S. Route 112 (US 112) in 1926. SR 19 replaced the original SR 21 designation of the highway which dated back to 1926. SR 21 ran from the Marion to Peru. SR 19 was extended over the years south to Noblesville.

== Route description ==
SR 19 begins at an intersection with SR 32 and SR 38, in Noblesville. The highway heads north along the banks of the White River as a two-lane highway. The route leaves the bank of the river heading north and passes through farmland with some houses. The road enters Cicero and passes through residential and commercial properties. The highway heads north towards Tipton, passing through farmland. The route enters Tipton from the south and passes through residential properties. In Tipton the road begins a concurrency with SR 28. The concurrency heads east crossing the Norfolk Southern Railroad tracks, before SR 19 turns back north. The road heads north leaving Tipton, passing through farmland with a few houses.

SR 19 heads north until it meets US 35 and SR 22, east of Kokomo. The concurrency heads east passing through Greentown and an intersection with SR 213. The concurrency ends when SR 19 turns north onto SR 13 and US 35/SR 22 keep heading east. SR 13 and SR 19 head north passing through farmland, with some houses. The concurrency end at an intersection with SR 18, when SR 13 heads east concurrent with SR 18 and SR 19 heads west concurrent with SR 18. The concurrency with SR 18 passes through Converse, before SR 19 turns north and SR 18 still heading west. The highway heads towards Peru, passing through rural farmland. The highway enters Peru from the southeast, having an intersection with SR 124. The highway passes over the Wabash River and into downtown Peru. While in downtown Peru SR 19 makes a few turns through downtown. The route leaves downtown Peru and has an intersection at US 24.

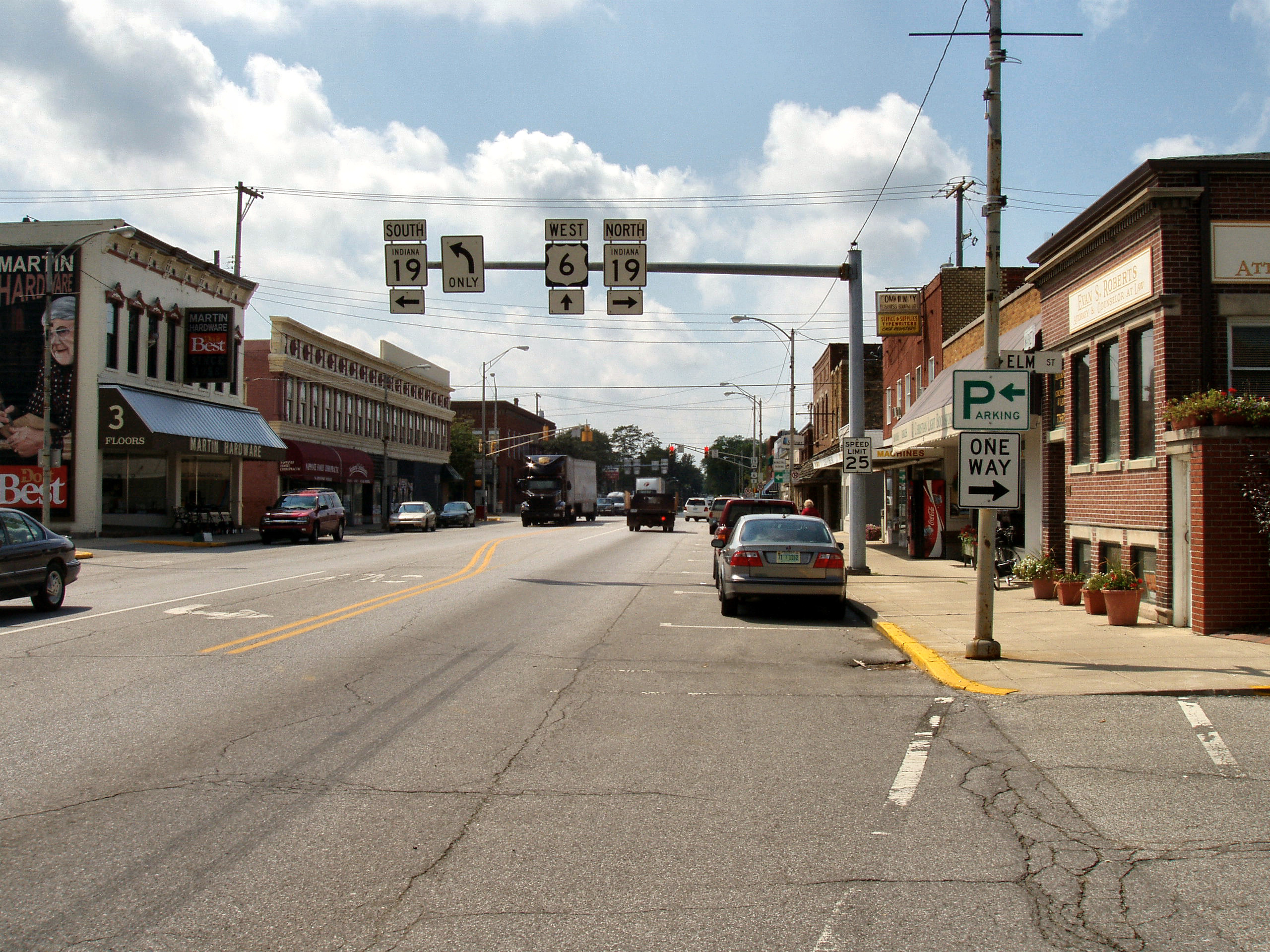
U.S. 6 crossing S.R. 19 in downtown Nappanee.

The road passes through a concurrency with SR 16 and through the town of Akron. In Mentone the highway crosses a set of Norfolk Southern Railroad tracks and through an intersection with SR 25. The road leaves Mentone and heads towards Nappanee, passing through Etna Green. In Etna Green the highway crosses the Chicago, Fort Wayne and Eastern Railroad and through a traffic light with US 30. North of Etna Green the road passes through farmland and makes a few sharp curve, but mostly keeps heading towards the north. The route enters Nappanee and has an intersection at US 6.

The road leaves Nappanee passing through Farmland with some houses. The route becomes a four-lane divided highway at an intersection with Elkhart County Road 26 (CR 26), south of Elkhart. The road enters Elkhart at an interchange with US 20. North of US 20 the highway becomes a four-lane highway with a center turn lane at an intersection with CR 20/Mishawaka Road. The highway passes under the Norfolk Southern Classification yard and has an intersection with Old US 33. The road heads north, west of downtown Elkhart, having an intersection with Old US 20. The highway has an intersection at Bypass Road, Old US 112, before curving due east. The highway turns back north at Cassopolis Street and passes through commercial properties. The road has an interchange with the Indiana Toll Road, Interstate 80 (I–80)/I–90. North of the toll road the roadway narrows to a two-lane highway with a center turn lane and passes through residential properties. The route leaves Elkhart and passes by the Simonton Lake. The highway narrows to a two-lane highway and passes through farmland. SR 19 ends at the Michigan state line and continues into Michigan as Old M–205.

Only one segment of State Road 19 is included in the National Highway System (NHS), this is the segment that is concurrent with U.S. Route 35 and SR 22. The NHS is a network of highways that are identified as being most important for the economy, mobility and defense of the nation. The highway is maintained by the Indiana Department of Transportation (INDOT) like all other state roads in the state. The department tracks the traffic volumes along all state highways as a part of its maintenance responsibilities using a metric called average annual daily traffic (AADT). This measurement is a calculation of the traffic level along a segment of roadway for any average day of the year. In 2010, INDOT figured that the lowest traffic levels were 780 vehicles and 170 commercial vehicles used the highway daily between Etna Green and County Road 900 North in Kosciusko County. The peak traffic volumes were 21,860 vehicles and 3,190 commercial vehicles AADT along the section of SR 19 concurrent with Cassopolis Street in Elkhart.

== History ==
The route that SR 19 takes today was first signed in 1918 as SR 51 and went from SR 2 in Elkhart to the Michigan state line. This section was renumber in 1926 to U.S. Route 112. In 1928, SR 19 was first signed from Nappanee to Elkhart and the route from SR 18 to Peru was signed as SR 21. SR 19 was extended to Peru from Nappanee in 1931 and from Noblesville to Cicero in 1932. In 1934 the section from Elkhart to the Michigan state line was renumber as U.S. Route 112S.

Until 2008, State Road 19 had existed in two sections. The southern section ended at State Road 22 east of Kokomo; the highway picked up again at State Road 18 south of Amboy.

== Major intersections ==
County	Location	mi	km	Destinations	Notes
Hamilton	Noblesville	0.00	0.00	SR 32 / SR 38 – Westfield, Frankfort, Anderson, Pendleton	Southern terminus of SR 19
Tipton	Tipton	16.89	27.18	SR 28 west – Frankfort	Western end of SR 28 concurrency
Tipton	Tipton	17.40	28.00	SR 28 east – Elwood	Eastern end of SR 28 concurrency
Howard	Hemlock	26.82	43.16	SR 26 – Lafayette, Portland	
Howard	Taylor Township	30.80	49.57	US 35 north / SR 22 west – Kokomo	Western end of US 35/SR 22 concurrency
Howard	Greentown			SR 213 south – Windfall City	Northern terminus of SR 213
Howard	Union Township			US 35 south / SR 13 south / SR 22 east – Gas City	Eastern end of US 35/SR 22 concurrency; southern end of SR 13 concurrency
Miami	Converse			SR 13 north / SR 18 east – Marion	Northern end of SR 13 concurrency; eastern end of SR 18 concurrency
Miami	Amboy			SR 18 west – Delphi	Western end of SR 18 concurrency
Miami	Santa Fe			SR 218 west – Delphi	Eastern terminus of SR 218
Miami	Peru			SR 124 east – Bluffton	Western terminus of SR 124
Miami	Peru			US 24 – Logansport, Wabash, Fort Wayne	
Miami	Richland Township			SR 16 west – Denver	Southern end of SR 16 concurrency
Miami	Richland Township			SR 16 east – Roann	Northern end of SR 16 concurrency
Fulton	Akron			SR 14 – Rochester, Fort Wayne	
Kosciusko	Mentone			SR 25 – Logansport, Rochester, Warsaw	
Kosciusko	Harrison Township			SR 10 west – Argos	Eastern terminus of SR 10
Kosciusko	Etna Green			Lincoln Highway (Old US 30)	
Kosciusko	Etna Green			US 30 – Valparaiso, Warsaw, Fort Wayne	
Elkhart	Nappanee			US 6 – Bremen, Ligonier	
Elkhart	Union Township			SR 119 north – Goshen	Southern terminus of SR 119
Elkhart	Elkhart			US 20 – South Bend, Angola	
Elkhart	Elkhart			I-80 Toll / I-90 Toll / Indiana Toll Road – Gary, Chicago, Toledo	Exit 92 (Indiana Toll Road)
Elkhart	Elkhart			Old M-205 / State Line Road	Continuation into Michigan
1.000 mi = 1.609 km; 1.000 km = 0.621 mi: Concurrency terminus
