= National Register of Historic Places listings in Elkhart County, Indiana =

Location of Elkhart County in Indiana

This is a list of the National Register of Historic Places listings in Elkhart County, Indiana.

This is intended to be a complete list of the properties and districts on the National Register of Historic Places in Elkhart County, Indiana, United States. Latitude and longitude coordinates are provided for many National Register properties and districts; these locations may be seen together in a map.

There are 39 properties and districts listed on the National Register in the county. Another 2 properties were once listed but have been removed.

Properties and districts located in incorporated areas display the name of the municipality, while properties and districts in unincorporated areas display the name of their civil township. Properties and districts split between multiple jurisdictions display the names of all jurisdictions.

This National Park Service list is complete through NPS recent listings posted January 2, 2026.

== Current listings ==
	Name on the Register	Image	Date listed	Location	City or town	Description
1	Baugo Township Gymnasium	Baugo Township Gymnasium	December 27, 2016 (#16000903)	Northeastern side of County Road 22, approximately 165 feet northwest of County Road 3; 41°38′10″N 86°01′22″W	Baugo Township	
2	Beardsley Avenue Historic District	Beardsley Avenue Historic District	September 28, 2003 (#03000979)	405 W. to 441 E. Beardsley Ave., the 700 block of N. Riverside, and Island Park; 41°41′32″N 85°58′31″W	Elkhart	
3	Albert R. Beardsley House	Albert R. Beardsley House	November 28, 1978 (#78000030)	302 E. Beardsley Ave. 41°41′36″N 85°58′24″W	Elkhart	
4	Dr. Havilah Beardsley House	Dr. Havilah Beardsley House	June 22, 2000 (#00000716)	102 W. Beardsley Ave. 41°41′36″N 85°58′36″W	Elkhart	
5	Emmanuel C. Bickel House	Emmanuel C. Bickel House	November 14, 1979 (#79000014)	614 Bower St. 41°41′20″N 85°59′03″W	Elkhart	
6	Bonneyville Mills	Bonneyville Mills	October 22, 1976 (#76000020)	2.5 miles east of Bristol on County Road 131; 41°43′10″N 85°45′53″W	York Township	
7	Bridge Street Bridge	Bridge Street Bridge	September 24, 2009 (#09000755)	Bridge St. over the St. Joseph River; 41°40′37″N 85°59′27″W	Elkhart	
8	Bristol-Washington Township School	Bristol-Washington Township School	August 29, 1991 (#91001164)	304 W. Vistula St. 41°43′18″N 85°49′14″W	Bristol	
9	Charles Gerard Conn Mansion	Charles Gerard Conn Mansion	December 19, 2007 (#07001278)	723 Strong Ave. 41°41′07″N 85°59′11″W	Elkhart	
10	Frank and Katharine Coppes House	Frank and Katharine Coppes House	November 29, 1990 (#90001783)	302 E. Market St. 41°26′34″N 85°59′54″W	Nappanee	
11	Dierdorff Farmstead	Dierdorff Farmstead	March 21, 2011 (#11000122)	2055 Dierdorff Rd., southeast of Goshen; 41°33′36″N 85°48′18″W	Elkhart Township	
12	Downtown Nappanee Historic District	Downtown Nappanee Historic District	March 8, 1990 (#90000324)	Main and Market Sts. 41°26′32″N 86°00′03″W	Nappanee	
13	Elcona Country Club		January 8, 2026 (#100012504)	56784 County Road 21; 41°40′12″N 85°51′04″W	Bristol vicinity	
14	Elkhart County Courthouse	Elkhart County Courthouse	April 10, 1980 (#80000034)	Courthouse Square; 41°35′14″N 85°50′08″W	Goshen	
15	Elkhart Downtown Commercial Historic District	Elkhart Downtown Commercial Historic District	September 26, 1997 (#97001178)	Roughly along Main St., roughly bounded by E. Jackson and 2nd Sts., Waterfall Dr., and Tyler Ave. 41°41′04″N 85°58′18″W	Elkhart	
16	Fort Wayne Street Bridge	Fort Wayne Street Bridge	September 15, 2005 (#05001018)	Indiana Ave. over the Elkhart River; 41°35′36″N 85°50′55″W	Goshen	
17	Solomon Fowler Mansion	Solomon Fowler Mansion	September 28, 2003 (#03000974)	11505 W. Vistula St. 41°43′07″N 85°49′47″W	Bristol	
18	Goshen Carnegie Public Library	Goshen Carnegie Public Library	February 17, 1983 (#83000028)	202 N. 5th St. 41°35′05″N 85°49′58″W	Goshen	
19	Goshen Historic District	Goshen Historic District	February 17, 1983 (#83000029)	Bounded by Pike, the railroad line, Cottage, Plymouth, Main, Purl, the Canal, and 2nd St. 41°34′57″N 85°49′57″W	Goshen	
20	Green Block	Green Block	July 17, 1980 (#80000035)	109-115 E. Lexington; 41°41′11″N 85°58′20″W	Elkhart	
21	William and Helen Koerting House	William and Helen Koerting House	December 22, 2009 (#09001128)	2625 Greenleaf Boulevard; 41°41′51″N 85°56′14″W	Elkhart	
22	Lerner Theatre	Lerner Theatre	October 2, 1980 (#80000036)	401 S. Main St. 41°41′02″N 85°58′18″W	Elkhart	
23	Log Cabin Inn Tourist Camp		June 3, 2019 (#100004041)	68306 US 33; 41°30′18″N 85°45′15″W	Benton	
24	Arthur Miller House	Arthur Miller House	April 2, 1992 (#92000184)	253 E. Market St. 41°26′33″N 85°59′56″W	Nappanee	
25	Mark L. and Harriet E. Monteith House	Mark L. and Harriet E. Monteith House	December 26, 1985 (#85003124)	871 E. Beardsley Ave. 41°41′41″N 85°57′48″W	Elkhart	
26	Morehouse Residential Historic District	Morehouse Residential Historic District	September 16, 2011 (#11000706)	Roughly bounded by E. Indiana, Morehouse, E. Hubbard, and the western side of Frances Aves. 41°40′16″N 85°57′43″W	Elkhart	
27	Nappanee Eastside Historic District	Nappanee Eastside Historic District	December 23, 2003 (#03001321)	Roughly bounded by Market, Main, John, and Summit Sts. 41°26′39″N 85°59′52″W	Nappanee	
28	Nappanee West Park and Pavilion	Nappanee West Park and Pavilion	March 28, 1994 (#94000231)	Junction of Nappanee and Van Buren Sts. 41°26′48″N 86°00′19″W	Nappanee	
29	Richard and Susan Pletcher House	Richard and Susan Pletcher House	August 24, 2020 (#100005508)	1102 Northwood Dr. 41°27′06″N 85°59′57″W	Nappanee	
30	Joseph and Sarah Puterbaugh Farm	Joseph and Sarah Puterbaugh Farm	March 3, 1995 (#95000198)	59123 County Road 9, south of Elkhart; 41°38′09″N 85°57′57″W	Concord Township	
31	Joseph J. Rohrer Farm	Joseph J. Rohrer Farm	February 23, 1990 (#90000330)	24394 County Road 40, southwest of Goshen; 41°32′08″N 85°55′56″W	Harrison Township	
32	St. John of the Cross Episcopal Church, Rectory and Cemetery	St. John of the Cross Episcopal Church, Rectory and Cemetery	September 17, 1980 (#80000037)	601 and 611 E. Vistula Rd. 41°43′16″N 85°48′40″W	Bristol	
33	St. John's Lutheran Church	St. John's Lutheran Church	November 25, 1994 (#94001349)	Northeastern corner of the junction of County Roads 15 and 32, west of Goshen; 41°34′49″N 85°54′22″W	Harrison Township	
34	H. & A. Selmer Inc. Factory	H. & A. Selmer Inc. Factory	September 4, 2018 (#100002860)	1119 N Main St. 41°41′52″N 85°58′35″W	Elkhart	
35	Stahly-Nissley-Kuhns Farm	Stahly-Nissley-Kuhns Farm	November 29, 1990 (#90001793)	1600 W. Market St. 41°26′39″N 86°01′02″W	Nappanee	
36	State Street-Division Street Historic District	State Street-Division Street Historic District	February 26, 1999 (#99000255)	Roughly both sides of State and Division Sts. between Main and Monroe; 41°40′58″N 85°57′59″W	Elkhart	
37	William N. Violett House	William N. Violett House	September 20, 1984 (#84001026)	3004 S. Main St. 41°32′41″N 85°49′40″W	Goshen	
38	Violett-Martin House and Gardens	Violett-Martin House and Gardens	September 20, 2007 (#07000978)	2612 S. Main St. 41°33′02″N 85°49′40″W	Goshen	
39	Young Women's Christian Association	Young Women's Christian Association	March 21, 1991 (#91000257)	120 W. Lexington Ave. 41°41′11″N 85°58′26″W	Elkhart	

== Former listings ==
	Name on the Register	Image	Date listed	Date removed	Location	City or town	Description
1	Bucklen Theatre	Bucklen Theatre	October 8, 1976 (#76000021)	November 21, 1986	S. Main and Harrison Sts.	Elkhart	Demolished in 1986.
2	Buescher Band Instrument Company Building		September 22, 1986 (#86002714)	June 21, 1996	225 E Jackson Ave.	Elkhart	Demolished in March 1993.

== See also ==
- List of National Historic Landmarks in Indiana
- National Register of Historic Places listings in Indiana
- Listings in neighboring counties: Cass (MI), Kosciusko, LaGrange, Marshall, Noble, St. Joseph, St. Joseph (MI)
- List of Indiana state historical markers in Elkhart County
