= Anabaptist–Jewish relations =

Interfaith relations

Anabaptists and Jews have had interactions for several centuries, since the origins of Anabaptism in the Radical Reformation in early modern Europe. Due to the historic insularity of many Anabaptist and Jewish communities, Anabaptist–Jewish relations have historically been limited, but there are notable examples of interactions between Anabaptists and Jews. Due to some similarities in dress, culture, and language, Amish and Mennonite communities, in particular, have often been compared and contrasted to Haredi and Hasidic Jewish communities.

== Scripture ==
Most Anabaptists use the Luther Bible, which contains the Christian Apocrypha as "intertestamental" books; Amish wedding ceremonies include "the retelling of the marriage of Tobias and Sarah in the Apocrypha".

The fathers of Anabaptism, such as Menno Simons, quoted "them [the Apocrypha] with the same authority and nearly the same frequency as books of the Hebrew Bible" and the texts regarding the Jewish martyrdoms under Antiochus IV in 1 Maccabees and 2 Maccabees are held in high esteem by the Anabaptists, who faced persecution in their history.

== Messianic Anabaptism ==
The secretive Lael Colony founded outside of Iron City, Tennessee, is an "Amish-Jewish" cult that was established by Mack Sharky, a man who claims to be of Jewish heritage and a Nazirite. Sharky preached a syncretic blend of Amish and Jewish cultural and religious beliefs and practices and members of the cult were subjected to isolation from the outside world. Patricia Hochstetler, a victim of the cult, has published a series of books titled Delusion: Growing Up in an Amish-Jewish Cult, detailing her experience growing up with an Old Order Amish heritage and falling prey to the cult.

== Anabapist–Jewish relations in popular culture ==
- In the popular film The Frisco Kid (1979) starring Gene Wilder, Wilder's character Belinski spends time with some Amish (whom he initially mistakes for Jews). Because he was injured when he was dumped out of a speeding wagon, the Amish nurse Belinski back to health and give him money for the train west to the end of the line.
- In Peter Weir's 1985 film Witness, an Amish boy named Samuel Lapp (played by Lukas Haas) approaches a Hasidic man at a train station, mistaking the Hasidic man for an Amish man.
- A Stranger Among Us, the 1992 Sidney Lumet film starring Melanie Griffith, has often been compared to Peter Weir's Witness, with many film reviewers comparing and contrasting the lifestyles of Amish and Hasidic communities. New York Times film critic Janet Maslin wrote that "The world of the Hasidim in Borough Park is less prettily exotic than that of the Amish in rural Pennsylvania." Variety magazine's film critic Todd McCarthy wrote that Hasidim are "a group that, like the Amish, is adamantly rooted in its old traditions and keeps very much to itself." The Chicago Tribune's film critic Dave Kehr wrote that the "fundamentalist Jews [of "A Stranger Among Us"], in fact, are virtually indistinguishable from the Pennsylvania Amish of Witness, and are similarly given to the baking of bread, the dancing of folk dances and the spouting of simple, traditional wisdom." Deseret News described A Stranger Among Us as "A feminist version of Witness, set in a Hasidic Jewish community of New York instead of rural Amish country."
- The American reality television show Breaking Amish features a scene where a group of Amish people from Amish Country visit New York City and mistake the Hasidic Jews of Brooklyn for fellow Amish people.
- Jewish-American playwrights Joseph Stein and Will Glickman were drawn to the Amish community of Lancaster County. They purchased a 50-cent tourist book filled with Pennsylvania Dutch slang and returned to New York to write Plain and Fancy, which opened on Broadway on January 27, 1955, and ran for 461 performances. It was an "old-fashioned, low-pressure alternative set among the Pennsylvania Dutch. It was pleasant and certainly suitable for the family trade." The musical has been playing at The Round Barn Theatre at Amish Acres in Nappanee, Indiana, annually since 1986, and surpassed 3,000 performances as of 2010. Richard Pletcher, founder and producer, dedicated The Round Barn Theatre stage to Stein in 1997 during its production of The Baker's Wife. The theatre has produced eight of Stein's musicals since then.
- The Rumspringa Kallah found on Amazon Kindle, is a recent novel by author Sender Zeyv. It is, without doubt, a literary work that plays on similarities between Amish and Chasidic Jews more than any other portrayal. It is the story of a Chasidic Jewish boy who is not allowed to seek a Jewish bride, yet he yearns for a partner in life who is as close to being a Chasidic Jewish woman as possible. He takes advantage of the Amish custom of Rumspringa by dressing up as an Amish boy in order to find the right girl. Once he does, he must subtly convince her of the truth of Jewish theology so she will want to convert and marry him.

== Anabaptist–Israeli relations ==
In 2011, a group of Anabaptists from Amish and Mennonite backgrounds travelled to Israel to seek reconciliation between Anabaptists and Jews. The Anabaptist group traveled to Israel to repent and ask for forgiveness for Anabaptist antisemitism, neglect of Jewish suffering, and indifference to the Holocaust. There was no written response to World War II or the Holocaust from the Mennonite Church in America, which the Anabaptist group referred to as a "sin of neglect." The group adhered to an Anabaptist version of Christian Zionism. In a prepared written statement, the group wrote:

On this day, we, representing Anabaptist people, humble ourselves and seek your forgiveness for our collective sin of pride and selfishness by ignoring the plight of the Jewish people and the nation of Israel.

Bishop Ben Girod, the leader of the reconciliation mission, has stated that Anabaptists should embrace "biblical Zionism," that Israel has a right to defend itself despite the Anabaptist tradition of pacifism, and that liberal, pro-Palestinian Anabaptists "deny the Jews" and display "arrogant support for the terrorists."

Due to lobbying from Palestinian Christians, particularly Kairos Palestine, the Mennonite Church USA issued a resolution to divest from its holdings in companies that benefit from the Israeli occupation of the West Bank in solidarity with Palestinian Christians and others living under Israeli occupation. The resolution that divested from Israel also condemned antisemitism, called for greater Anabaptist-Jewish interfaith cooperation, and critically examined the church's role in the Holocaust. The resolution had previously been rejected due to the church's fear of being accused of antisemitism. Mat Staver, an Evangelical founder and chairman of the Liberty Counsel and president of Christians in Defense of Israel, criticized the decision as confusing, contradictory, and antisemitic and accused the Mennonite Church USA of desiring to "destroy Israel".

== Anabaptist–Jewish interfaith families ==
Lisa Schirch, a faculty member of Eastern Mennonite University, has written about being in an interfaith marriage and raising her children both Jewish and Mennonite. Schirch knows of 15 other Jewish–Mennonite interfaith homes.

== Anabaptist–Jewish interfaith cooperation ==
The rabbi, philosopher, and theologian Steven Schwarzschild maintained a lengthy religious dialogue with Mennonite theologian and pacifist John Howard Yoder. Despite their theological differences, they kept a close friendship. Schwarzschild wrote that "there are few people, of any faith, with whom I seem to be speaking a language so similar as [Yoder's]", while Yoder wrote that he had been "taught much by numerous Jewish friends, but by no one else so much as Steven S. Schwarzschild ztz'l, to whose memory [The Jewish-Christian Schism Revisited] is dedicated."

Following the Pittsburgh synagogue shooting of 2018, the First Mennonite Church of San Francisco held a Friday evening vigil for the murdered Jews of Pittsburgh in front of the Congregation Sha’ar Zahav. The Mennonites prayed and sang while the Jewish congregants gathered for Shabbat. The vigil began with a joint Jewish-Mennonite song session.

In 2023, the Anabaptist Mennonite Biblical Seminary hosted a symposium entitled "Jews and Mennonites: Reading the Bible After the Holocaust", which featured eight rabbis and Jewish scholars and fourteen Mennonite pastors and scholars.

== Anabaptist converts to Judaism ==
In the early 1600s, a Mennonite couple named Hans Joostenszn (Abraham Abrahamsz) and Sanne Thijsdochter (Sara Abrahamsz) converted to Judaism. Leaving the Mennonite community of Emmerik, then in the Dutch Republic, they travelled throughout Poland, Lithuania, and the Ottoman Empire. Learning more about Judaism in Gdańsk, they converted to Judaism in Constantinople. They chose Rabbinic Judaism rather than the krayers (Karaites). While the Englishman who brought him to Judaism did not require him to undergo circumcision, Abraham elected to receive circumcision in Ottoman Constantinople. Upon their return to the Netherlands, the couple were arrested and interrogated by the Dutch Christian authorities. The Jewish couple attempted to dispute the charge of apostasy by underscoring that neither had ever been baptized and that Abraham Abrahamsz's crime of circumcision had occurred outside of Dutch legal jurisdiction. The couple claimed to have had a Jewish identity since adolescence and thought of themselves as Jews who had escaped a Mennonite community rather than as apostates. Inspired by the examples of the Abrahamsz family, a Reformed Protestant named Jan Pieterszn also converted to Judaism. Pieterszn did not attempt to deflect from the accusations of apostasy during his trial, claiming that it was his right to choose his religion. Even a year into his trial, he was steadfast in his commitment to Judaism and was willing to sacrifice his life in defense of his religious beliefs and compared his persecutors to the Spanish Inquisitors. It was proposed that these Jewish converts be burned at the stake or drowned, but scholars believe that the punishments were not meted out. The Hoorn convert trial was an issue of national significance and is an important event in the history of the Jews in the Netherlands and the history of religious tolerance.

== Anabaptist and Jewish cuisine ==
"Grow and Behold", a Brooklyn-based kosher meat company, obtains much of their meat from Amish-owned farms. The company aims to produce sustainable, ethically-produced alternatives to meat that comes from factory farms.

Kosher Amish butter is available on the American market. "Fresh Made Amish Butter" has been certified kosher by the Orthodox Union, however, "Fresh Dairy Amish Butter" has not been certified kosher despite some of the butter having been labeled with an unauthorized OU hechsher.

The cooking of Pennsylvania German Christians and Pennsylvania German Jews often overlaps, particularly vegetarian dishes that do not contain non-kosher ingredients such as pork or that mix meat and dairy together.

== Anabaptists during the Holocaust ==
The Anabaptist response to the Shoah varied widely, ranging from indifference to resistance to collaboration with and perpetration of Nazi atrocities.

=== Netherlands ===
A notable number of Dutch Anabaptists hid Jews from Nazi authorities. 40 Dutch Anabaptists have been honored by Israel as Righteous Among the Nations. However, a significant number of Dutch Mennonite war criminals who participated in the Holocaust escaped from Dutch prisons and fled to South America to live in the Russian Mennonite communities of Paraguay. Jacob Luitjens, nicknamed the terror of Roden, was a notable Dutch Mennonite Nazi who fled to Paraguay with the assistance of Mennonites before resettling in Canada and joining a Mennonite congregation in Vancouver. The Netherlands attempted to extradite Luitjens in 1991. Many Mennonites in Vancouver supported Luitjens. He was deported from Canada and imprisoned in the Netherlands, the last Dutch Nazi to be put on trial.

=== Poland ===
The Mennonite town of Deutsch Wymyschle, Poland, was adjacent to the town of Gabin, half of the population of which was Jewish. Following the Nazi invasion of Poland on September 1, 1939, the Nazis rounded up the Jews of Gabin and confiscated their property. Eager to profit from the ethnic cleansing of the Jewish population and wanting to comply with Nazi policies of Germanization, the Mennonites of Deutsch Wymyschle claimed the formerly Jewish homes and businesses as their own. Mennonite women often solidified their loyalty to the Nazis by marrying soldiers of the German Wehrmacht, with many weddings being performed in the Mennonite church of Deutsch Wymyschle involving couples dressed in Nazi uniforms. Erich L. Ratzlaff, a prominent Mennonite Nazi who became Mayor of Gabin, was known to carry a whip in order to terrorize Jews. Ratzlaff later immigrated to Canada and became an editor of the Mennonitische Rundschau newspaper from 1967 to 1979.

=== Ukraine ===
During the Nazi occupation of Ukraine in the spring of 1942, many Russian Mennonites from Ukraine embraced the Nazi invaders as liberators. Due to the German ancestry, language, and culture of the Russian Mennonites, the Nazis did not target them for persecution and they flourished with the newfound cultural and religious freedom that had been denied to them by the anti-religious Soviet authorities under Joseph Stalin. Because Russian Mennonites were of German heritage and rarely intermarried with Slavic or Jewish Ukrainians, the Nazis treated the Mennonites favorably due to their supposed "racial purity". While some Russian Mennonites were active collaborators and perpetrators of Nazi war crimes against Jews, the most common Mennonite response was indifference. Mennonites celebrated their new freedoms while their Jewish neighbors were rounded up by the Nazi occupiers and subjected to pillaging, torture, humiliation, and mass executions. Less than a month after the Jews of Zaporizhia were subjected to genocide, the Mennonites of Chortitza were resuming Easter celebrations and other facets of Mennonite life. There is little in the historical record to suggest that Mennonites in Ukraine resisted the Nazis or offered aid to their Jewish neighbors.

== German, Pennsylvania Dutch, Plautdietsch, and Yiddish ==
Because both Yiddish and Pennsylvania Dutch are High German languages, there are strong similarities between the two languages and a degree of mutual intelligibility. Pennsylvania Dutch is spoken by some Anabaptists, particularly older Amish people and to a less degree older Mennonites.

In Pennsylvania, Pennsylvania Dutch Christians and Pennsylvania German Jews have often maintained a special relationship due to their common German language and cultural heritage. Historically, Pennsylvania Dutch and Pennsylvania German Jews often had overlapping bonds in German-American business and community life. Due to this historical bond there are several mixed-faith cemeteries in Lehigh County, including Allentown's Fairview Cemetery, where German-Americans of both the Jewish and Protestant faiths are buried.

Plautdietsch, a Low German language spoken by the Russian Mennonites, also has many similarities to Yiddish because both are German languages. However, being a Low German dialect, Plautdietsch has a lesser degree of mutual intelligibility with Yiddish than does Pennsylvania Dutch.

== Notable people of mixed Anabaptist-Jewish heritage ==
- American actress Gwyneth Paltrow, her father Bruce Paltrow was of Eastern European Jewish heritage and her mother Blythe Danner is a German-American of partial Pennsylvania Dutch Mennonite heritage.
- American film director Jake Paltrow, brother of Gwyneth Paltrow.
- American actress Dyan Cannon
- Canadian politician Roland Penner
- Canadian academic Norman Penner
- American Jazz Musician David Friesen
- Sophie Simmons

== See also ==
- Anabaptist settler colonialism
- Christianity and Judaism
- Ethnic Mennonite
- Interfaith dialogue
- Jewish Christian
