= List of Indiana state historical markers in Elkhart County =

Location of Elkhart County in Indiana

This is a list of the Indiana state historical markers in Elkhart County.

This is intended to be a complete list of the official state historical markers placed in Elkhart County, Indiana, United States by the Indiana Historical Bureau. The locations of the historical markers and their latitude and longitude coordinates are included below when available, along with their names, years of placement, and topics as recorded by the Historical Bureau. There are 14 historical markers located in Elkhart County.

== Historical markers ==
Marker title	Image	Year placed	Location	Topics
Indiana Territory Line		1966	Southern side of U.S. Route 33 between Dunlap and Goshen, south of Elkhart; 41°37′0″N 85°53′28.8″W	Early Settlement and Exploration, Government Institutions
A.E. Kunderd Gladiolus Farm		1997	U.S. Route 33 at its junction with County Road 28 near Goshen; 41°36′31″N 85°52′43″W	Agriculture, Nature and Natural Disasters
Howard W. Hawks		1998	301 S. Fifth Street in Goshen; 41°35′1″N 85°49′59″W	Arts and Culture
Ambrose G. Bierce		1998	518 W. Franklin Street in Elkhart; 41°40′57″N 85°58′42.4″W	Arts and Culture, Military
Krider Nurseries World's Fair Garden		2001	Junction of Bristol and Railroad Streets in Middlebury; 41°40′41″N 85°42′32″W	Nature and Natural Disasters, Business, Industry, and Labor
Elkhart County Courthouse		2001	Junction of W. Lincoln Street (State Road 4) and Main Street (U.S. Route 33/State Road 15) at the southeastern corner of the courthouse in Goshen; 41°35′14″N 85°50′7″W	Government Institutions, Buildings and Architecture
Goshen's Carnegie Library		2003	202 S. Fifth Street in Goshen; 41°35′5.1″N 85°49′58.3″W	Carnegie Library, Buildings and Architecture
Nappanee Cartoonists	Nappanee Cartoonist Historic Marker in front of the Nappanee Public Library, N Main St & E Walnut St, Nappanee, Ind.	2005	157 N. Main Street, next to the public library in Nappanee; 41°26′36″N 86°0′4″W	Arts and Culture, Newspapers and Media
Nappanee Furniture		2005	Coppes Napanee 452 E. Market Street in Nappanee; 41°26′34″N 85°59′47.4″W	Business, Industry, and Labor, Transportation
C.G. Conn Company		2006	Northwestern corner of the junction of Jackson Boulevard and Elkhart Avenue in Elkhart; 41°41′20.6″N 85°58′4″W	Arts and Culture, Business, Industry, and Labor, Music, Education
E. Hill Turnock		2006	Elkhart Municipal Building, 229 S. Second Street, in Elkhart; 41°41′6″N 85°58′27″W	Buildings and Architecture
Graves et al. v. Indiana		2007	Memorial Park at the junction of State Roads 15 and 120 in Bristol; 41°43′16.5″N 85°49′2″W	African American, Underground Railroad
Dr. Franklin L. Miles		2007	403 W. Franklin Street in Elkhart; 41°40′58″N 85°58′35″W	Business, Industry, and Labor, Medicine
Charles Gordone		2009	Elkhart Public Library, 300 S. 2nd Street, in Elkhart; 41°41′5″N 85°58′25″W	African American, Arts and Culture

== See also ==
- List of Indiana state historical markers
- National Register of Historic Places listings in Elkhart County, Indiana
