= Plain and Fancy =

- Music: Albert Hague
- Lyrics: Arnold B. Horwitt
- Book: Joseph Stein; Will Glickman
- Productions: 1955 Broadway; 1956 West End

Plain and Fancy is a musical comedy with a book by Joseph Stein and Will Glickman, lyrics by Arnold B. Horwitt, and music by Albert Hague. One of the first depictions of an Amish community in American popular culture, it includes a traditional barn raising and an old-fashioned country wedding. The musical ran on Broadway in 1955–56, and has been produced yearly at the Round Barn Theatre in Nappanee, Indiana since 1986.

== Productions ==
The show opened pre-Broadway at the Shubert Theatre in New Haven, Connecticut on December 11, 1954, and at the Shubert Theater in Philadelphia on January 5, 1955. The Broadway production, produced by Richard Kollmar, directed by Morton DaCosta and choreographed by Helen Tamiris, opened on January 27, 1955 at the Mark Hellinger Theater. It transferred to the Winter Garden Theatre on February 28, 1955, where it remained until November 7, 1955 before returning to the Mark Hellinger on November 9, 1955, closing on March 3, 1956 after a total of 461 performances. The cast included Richard Derr as Dan, Shirl Conway as Ruth, Will B. Able as Jacob, Gloria Marlowe as Katie, Douglas Fletcher Rodgers as Ezra, Barbara Cook as Hilda, David Daniels as Peter and the 12-year-old Scott Walker (billed as "Scotty Engel") as a young miller. Bea Arthur understudied Conway, and Carol Lawrence was among the chorus members. Lawrence recorded her version of the song "This Is All Very New to Me" from the 1960 album Tonight at 8:30.

An American national tour ran in 1955 starring Alexis Smith and Craig Stevens.

The West End production opened on January 25, 1956 at the Theatre Royal, Drury Lane, where it ran for 315 performances. The cast included Jack Drummond, Joan Hovis, Malcolm Keen, Grace O'Connor, Michael Craze and Virginia Somers.

Since 1986, the Round Barn Theatre at Amish Acres in Nappanee, Indiana has staged Plain and Fancy every year as part of its repertory program. It has been performed by the company more than 3,500 times. Richard Pletcher, founder and producer, dedicated the theatre's stage to Joseph Stein in 1996 following its production of The Baker's Wife.

A major summer stock production at the famed Melody Top Theatre in Milwaukee Wisconsin which starred Margaret Whiting as Ruth, TV’s Carl Betz as Dan, Joy Garret as Hilda and Ed Evanko as Peter. Among the Chorus was Dennis Grimaldi.

In 2006, the York Theatre Company in New York City worked with librettist Joseph Stein to reduce the show to a 13-character musical, and this new version was produced as part of the company's Mufti Theatre concert series directed by David Glenn Armstrong. It starred Cady Huffman, Charlotte Rae, Nancy Anderson, Jack Noseworthy, Erick Devine, Jordan Leeds and Sara Delaney.

== Plot synopsis ==
New York City sophisticates Dan King and Ruth Winters travel to Bird-in-Hand in the Amish country of Lancaster County, Pennsylvania to sell a piece of property to Jacob Yoder, who intends to present it to his daughter Katie and her intended Ezra as a wedding gift. While there, they become involved with the local villagers, including Hilda Miller, who mistakes Dan's kindness for romantic overtures, and Ezra's banished brother Peter, who returns to claim the hand of his childhood sweetheart, Katie.

== Song list ==
Act I

- You Can't Miss It
- It Wonders Me
- Plenty of Pennsylvania
- Young and Foolish
- Why Not Katie?
- Young and Foolish (Reprise)
- It's a Helluva Way to Run a Love Affair
- This Is All Very New to Me
- Plain We Live
- The Shunning

Act II

- How Do You Raise a Barn?
- Follow Your Heart
- City Mouse, Country Mouse
- I'll Show Him!
- Carnival Ballet
- On the Midway
- Take Your Time and Take Your Pick
- Plenty of Pennsylvania (Reprise)

== Recording ==
Original cast recordings of both the Broadway and London productions were released.

== Awards and nominations ==
=== Original Broadway production ===
Year	Award	Category	Nominee	Result
1956	Theatre World Award		Shirl Conway	Won
1956	Theatre World Award		Barbara Cook	Won
1956	Theatre World Award		David Daniels	Won
