= The Round Barn Theatre =

Regional theatre in the US state of Indiana

Coordinates: 41.443641°N 86.019542°W

The Round Barn Theatre is a non-Equity regional theatre located in Nappanee, Indiana. It is part of The Barns at Nappanee, a historic farm and heritage resort. The Barns at Nappanee, Home of Amish Acres is owned by Marlin and Christy Stutzman The Stutzman's are the producers of The Round Barn Theatre. The building is a round barn built in 1911 that was dismantled and relocated at the farm in 1998. It was moved twelve miles (19 km) from its original location. To meet state building codes a thirty-two ton six-inch (152 mm) tubular steel frame was erected and the original studs, compression rings, rafters, and cupola were reassembled attached to the frame. The barn is sixty feet in diameter and stands sixty feet tall to the top of the cupola. Insulation is sandwiched between new barn siding inside and outside the frame. A post and beam straw shed that was added to the structure shortly after its construction was also moved intact to become the proscenium stage for the theatre. Robert Holdeman, AIA, of Traverse City, Michigan designed the plans that converted the barn into a state of the art performing arts center. Ninety-six dimmer circuits provide theatre lighting and a sound system using Audiotechnica cordless microphones provide the required tools for the lighting and sound designers. The stage is outfitted with a counterweight fly system. The orchestra is housed in a loft open to the audience. The theatre has a seating capacity of 375.

== Programming at The Round Barn Theatre ==
The Round Barn Theatre offers a 45-week season that is filled with 5–6 Broadway style musicals. Examples include Hunchback of Notre Dame, Into the Woods, Disney's Beauty and the Beast, and more. Each season, RBT employs over 50 artists to successfully execute the theatrical season. Audience members can expect to see performers from all around the country who temporarily make Nappanee their home to work with RBT.

== Lux Theatre Group at RBT ==
Lux Theatre Group, formally Legacy Theatre Group, is the producing company who makes The Round Barn Theatre their home. Specializing in brand new musicals, Lux Theatre Group has produced world premiere productions including, A Musical Christmas Carol, Land That I Love, and the Hallmark Channel and Janette Oke favorite When Calls the Heart The Musical which premieres in 2021. The Lux Theatre Group is founded by Christy Stutzman who serves as the Composer writing the music and lyrics. John Coates orchestrates, and Bethany Crawford pens the scripts.
