= Jack Kooistra =

Dutch journalist and WWII historian (1930–2025)

- Born: Jacob Kooistra; 24 March 1930; Zwaagwesteinde, Netherlands
- Died: 14 January 2025 (aged 94)
- Occupations: journalist, historian and Nazi hunter
- Awards: Order of Orange-Nassau (1998, 2024), Zilveren Anjer (2016)

Jacob "Jack" Kooistra (24 March 1930 – 14 January 2025) was a Dutch journalist, World War II historian and Nazi hunter.

Starting from a young age, Kooistra started tracking names of soldiers who died during World War II for his entire live. He created almost 180,000 name cards with information. After having this archive in his house, it was moved to the private museum "Militair Mobiel Depot" in Loosdrecht. In 1992, Kooistra, tracked down together with the television program Reporter, the Nazi collaborator Jacob Luitjens, nicknamed De Schrik van Roden, in Canada. Canada expelled him and Luitjens was sentenced to 28 months in prison in the Netherlands. Koostra became known nationally and received the nickname the Frisian Wiesenthal. He wrote multiple World War II books inclusive biographies and was journalist for Friesch Dagblad.

Kooistra received the Zilveren Anjer in 2016 from Beatrix of the Netherlands. In 1998 he became Knight of the Order of Orange-Nassau and was promoted Officer of the Order of Orange-Nassau in August 2024.

Kooistra died on 14 January 2025, at the age of 94.
