= Vistula, Indiana =

- Unincorporated community and Census designated place
- Location within Indiana Location within the United States
- Coordinates: 41°44′57″N 85°43′24″W
- Country: United States
- State: Indiana
- County: Elkhart
- Township: York
- Elevation: 794 ft (242 m)
- ZIP code: 46507
- FIPS code: 18-79226
- GNIS feature ID: 2830368

Vistula is an unincorporated community in York Township, Elkhart County, Indiana.

== History ==
Vistula was laid out in 1865. It was likely named after the Vistula River.

== Demographics ==
Historical population
Census	Pop.	Note	%±
2023 (est.)	45

The United States Census Bureau defined Vistula as a census designated place in the 2022 American Community Survey.
