= Arthur Miller House =

Historic house in Indiana, United States

- U.S. National Register of Historic Places
- U.S. Historic district – Contributing property
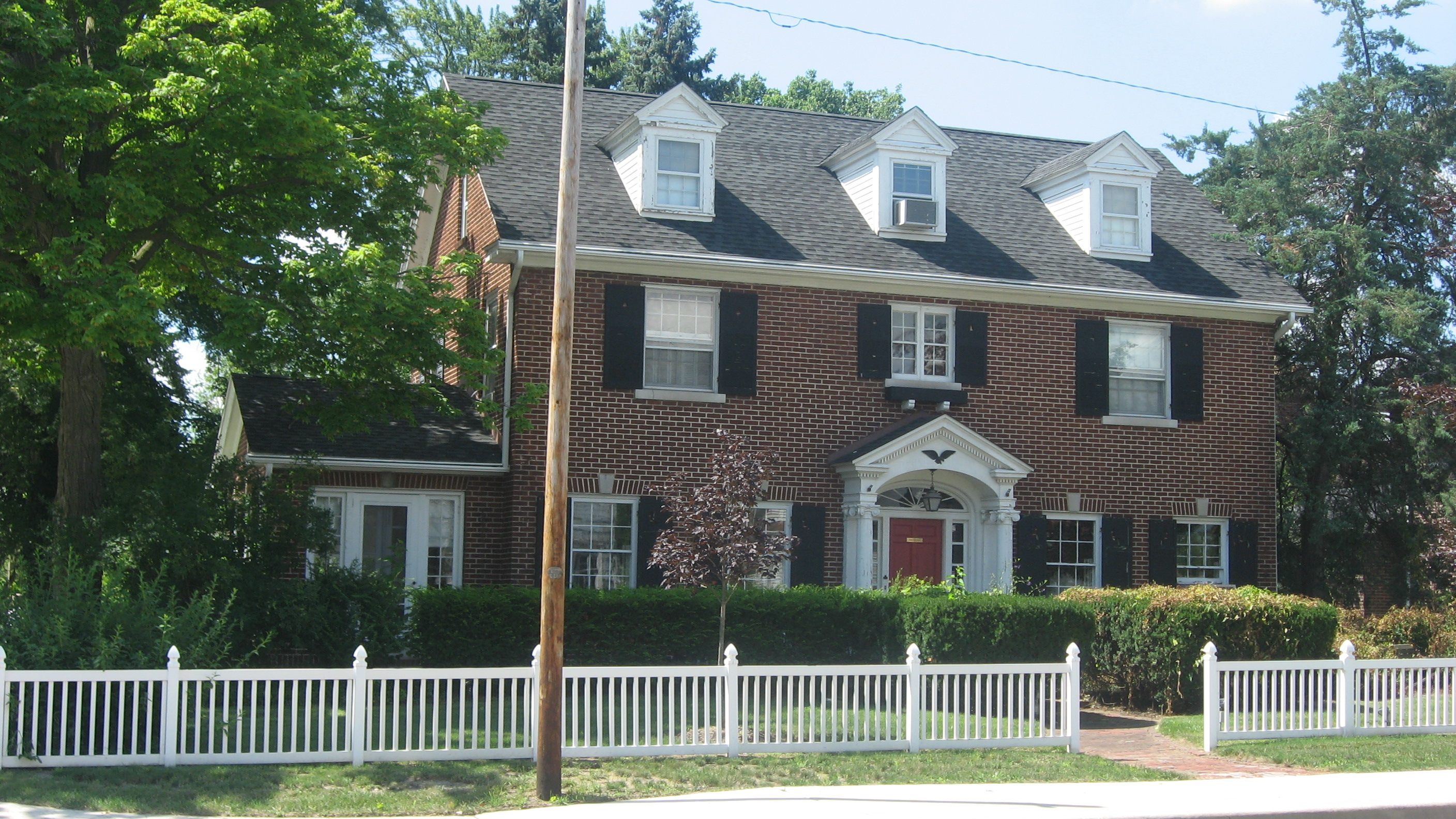
- Arthur Miller, July 2013

- Location within Indiana Location within the United States
- Location: 253 E. Market St., Nappanee, Indiana
- Coordinates: 41°26′33″N 85°59′57″W
- Area: less than one acre
- Built: 1922
- Architect: Frazier, Clarence E.
- Architectural style: Colonial Revival
- NRHP reference No.: 92000184
- Added to NRHP: April 2, 1992

Arthur Miller House, also known as the 253 East Market Guesthouse, is a historic home located at Nappanee, Indiana. It was built in 1922, and is a 2 1/2-story, rectangular, three bay by two bay, Colonial Revival style brick dwelling. It has a side gable roof and features a one-story front portico supported by Ionic order columns.

It was added to the National Register of Historic Places in 1992. It is located in the Nappanee Eastside Historic District.
