= Harrison Township, Elkhart County, Indiana =

Harrison Township
- Township
- Location of Harrison Township in Elkhart County
- Coordinates: 41°33′57″N 85°56′41″W
- Country: United States
- State: Indiana
- County: Elkhart

Government
  - Type: Indiana township

Area
  - Total: 35.77 sq mi (92.6 km^{2})
  - Land: 35.74 sq mi (92.6 km^{2})
  - Water: 0.03 sq mi (0.078 km^{2})
- Elevation: 807 ft (246 m)

Population (2020)
  - Total: 3,547
  - Density: 124.1/sq mi (47.9/km^{2})
- FIPS code: 18-31774
- GNIS feature ID: 453385

Harrison Township is one of sixteen townships in Elkhart County, Indiana. As of the 2010 census, its population was 4,435.

== History ==
Harrison Township was established in the 1830s, and named for William Henry Harrison.

The Joseph J. Rohrer Farm and St. John's Lutheran Church are listed on the National Register of Historic Places.

== Geography ==
According to the 2010 census, the township has a total area of 35.77 square miles (92.6 km^{2}), of which 35.74 square miles (92.6 km^{2}) (or 99.92%) is land and 0.03 square miles (0.078 km^{2}) (or 0.08%) is water. Yellow Creek Lake is in this township.

=== Cities and towns ===
- Goshen (west edge)
- Wakarusa (east quarter)

=== Unincorporated towns ===
- Southwest

=== Adjacent townships ===
- Concord Township (north)
- Elkhart Township (east)
- Jackson Township (southeast)
- Union Township (south)
- Locke Township (southwest)
- Olive Township (west)
- Baugo Township (northwest)

=== Major highways ===
- SR 19
- SR 119

=== Cemeteries ===
The township contains six cemeteries: Hoke, Inbody, Miller, Stutsman, Wenger and Yellow Creek.

== Education ==
Harrison Township residents are eligible to obtain a library card at the Wakarusa-Olive & Harrison Township Public Library in Wakarusa.
