= Bonneyville Mill =

- Bonneyville Mills
- U.S. National Register of Historic Places
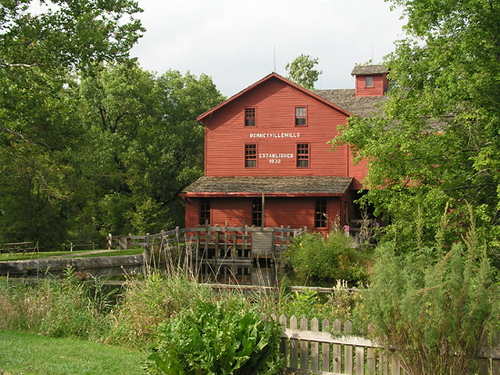
- Bonneyville Mill, July 2008

- Location within Indiana Location within the United States
- Location: 2.5 miles east of Bristol on County Road 131, York Township, Elkhart County, Indiana
- Coordinates: 41°43′10″N 85°45′53″W
- Area: less than one acre
- Built: 1832
- Built by: Bonney, Edward
- NRHP reference No.: 76000020
- Added to NRHP: October 22, 1976

Bonneyville Mills is a historic grist mill located at Bonneyville Mills in York Township, Elkhart County, Indiana. It was built in 1832, and is a 2 1/2-story, square, heavy timber-frame building on a stone foundation. It measures 40 feet by 40 feet and has several shed additions. The mill was converted to electric power in 1919 and restored in the 1970s. The last private owner of the mill, W. Frank Mauck, died in 1981.

It was added to the National Register of Historic Places in 1976.
