= Nappanee West Park and Pavilion =

- U.S. National Register of Historic Places
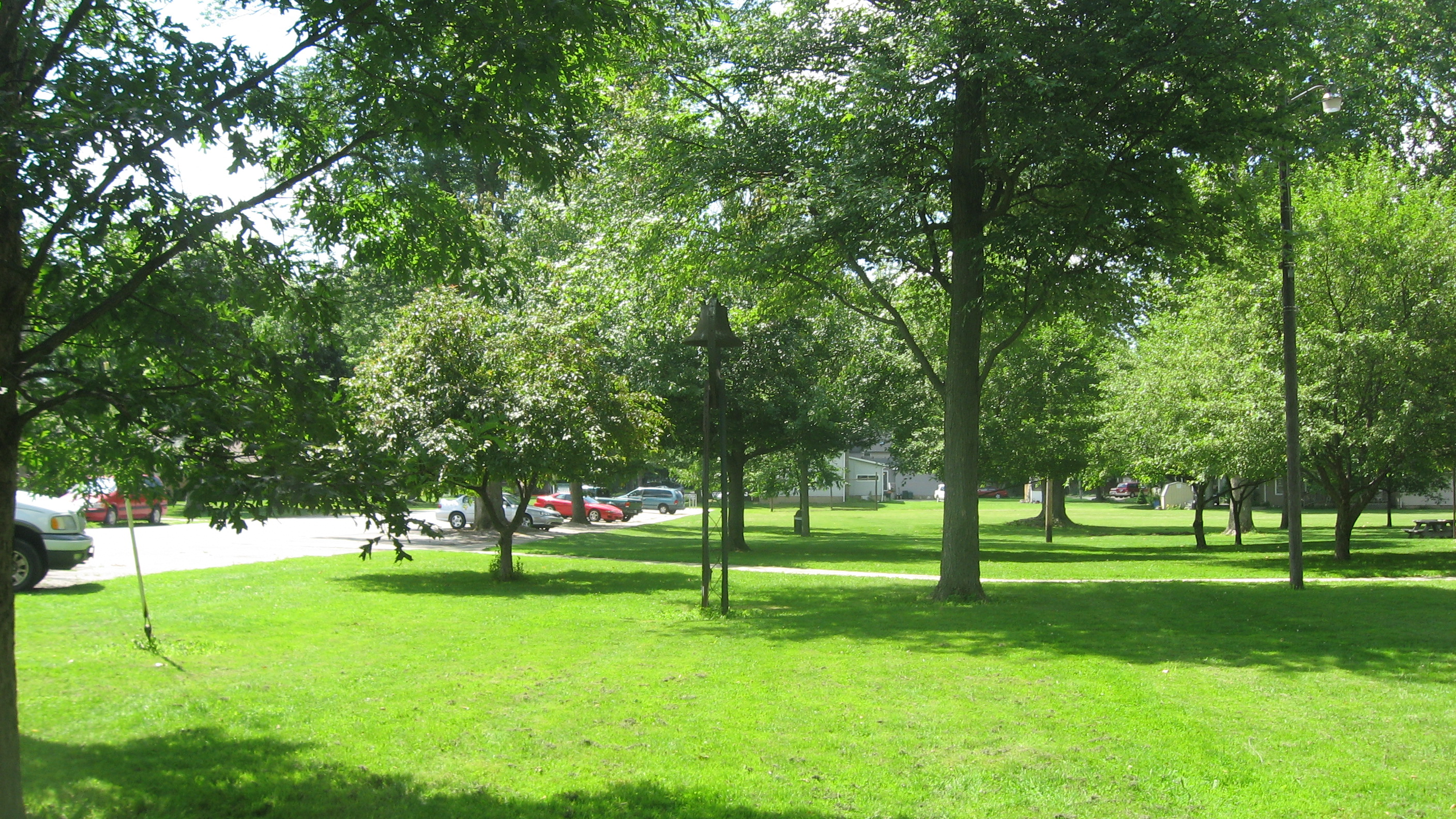
- Nappanee West Park, July 2013

- Location within Indiana Location within the United States
- Location: Jct. of Nappanee and Van Buren Sts., Nappanee, Indiana
- Coordinates: 41°26′48″N 86°00′19″W
- Area: 4.6 acres (1.9 ha)
- Built: 1923
- Architectural style: Bungalow/craftsman
- NRHP reference No.: 94000231
- Added to NRHP: March 28, 1994

Nappanee West Park and Pavilion, also known as the Community Park of Nappanee, Nappanee Westside Park and Pavilion, and Nappanee West Park Chautauqua Pavilion, is a historic public park located at Nappanee, Indiana. The Bungalow style pavilion was built in 1923 to house a local Chautauqua. It was used for that purpose until 1925. It was renovated in 1946 to temporarily house a school and in 1958 became home to the Nappanee Civic Theater. The pavilion was renovated in the 1990s. Also on the property is a contributing fire bell (1898).

It was added to the National Register of Historic Places in 1994.
