= Downtown Nappanee Historic District =

Historic district in Indiana, United States

- U.S. National Register of Historic Places
- U.S. Historic district
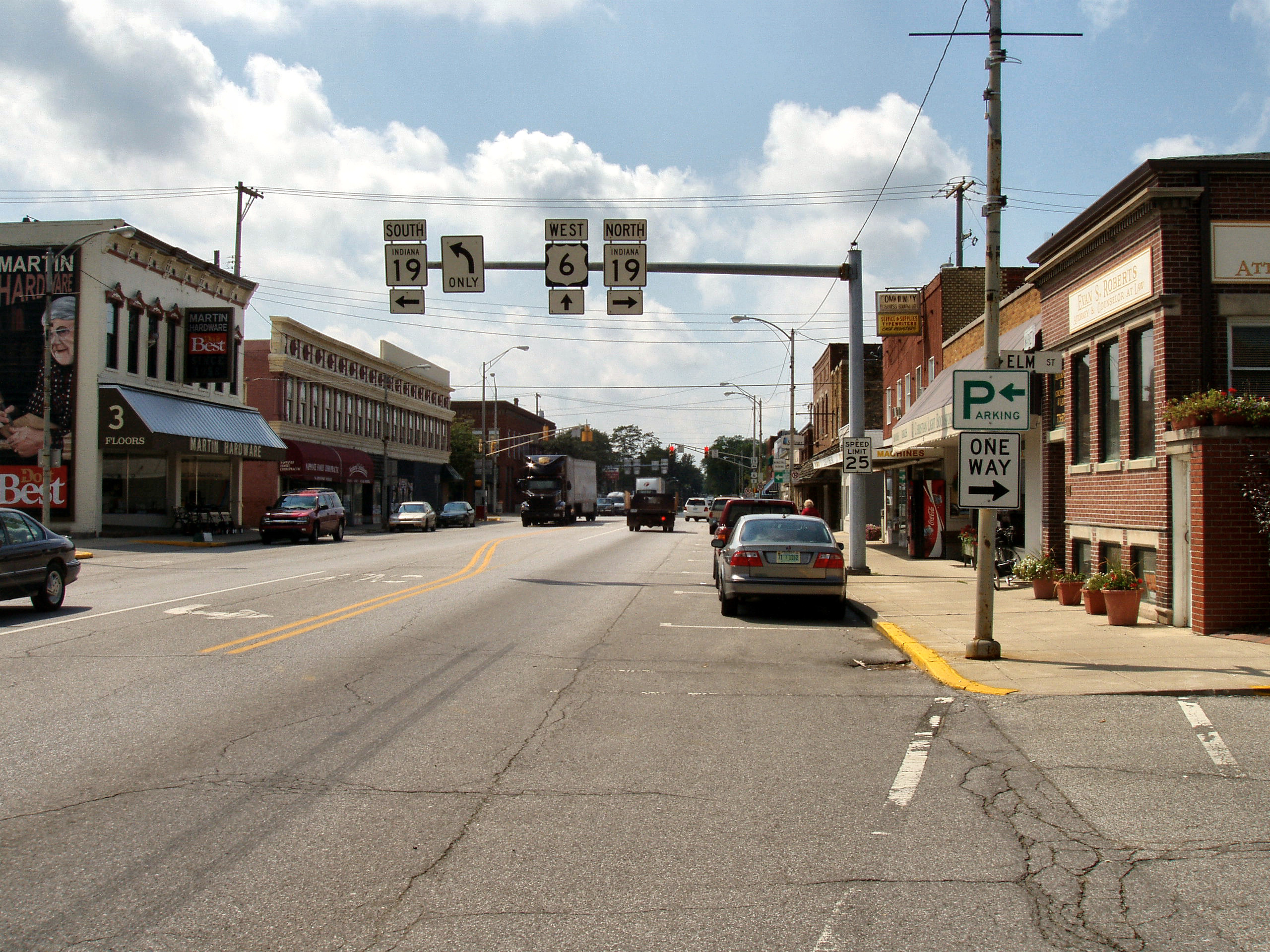
- Downtown Nappanee Historic District, August 2005

- Location within Indiana Location within the United States
- Location: Main and Market Sts., Nappanee, Indiana
- Coordinates: 41°34′57″N 85°49′57″W
- Area: 9.2 acres (3.7 ha)
- Architect: Frazier, Henry F.
- Architectural style: Classical Revival, Italianate
- NRHP reference No.: 90000324
- Added to NRHP: March 8, 1990

Downtown Nappanee Historic District is a national historic district located at Nappanee, Indiana. The district encompasses 26 contributing buildings in the central business district of Nappanee. It was developed between about 1874 and 1939, and includes notable examples of Italianate and Classical Revival style architecture. Notable buildings include the Bechtel Building (1888), U.S. Post Office, Dietrich Block, Kaufman's Department Store (1902), First National Bank, Yoder's Garage, B&O Depot, Hartman Brothers Building (1881, 1914), and Farmers and Traders Bank (1915).

It was added to the National Register of Historic Places in 1990.
