= St. John's Lutheran Church (Goshen, Indiana) =

Historic church in Indiana, United States

- U.S. National Register of Historic Places
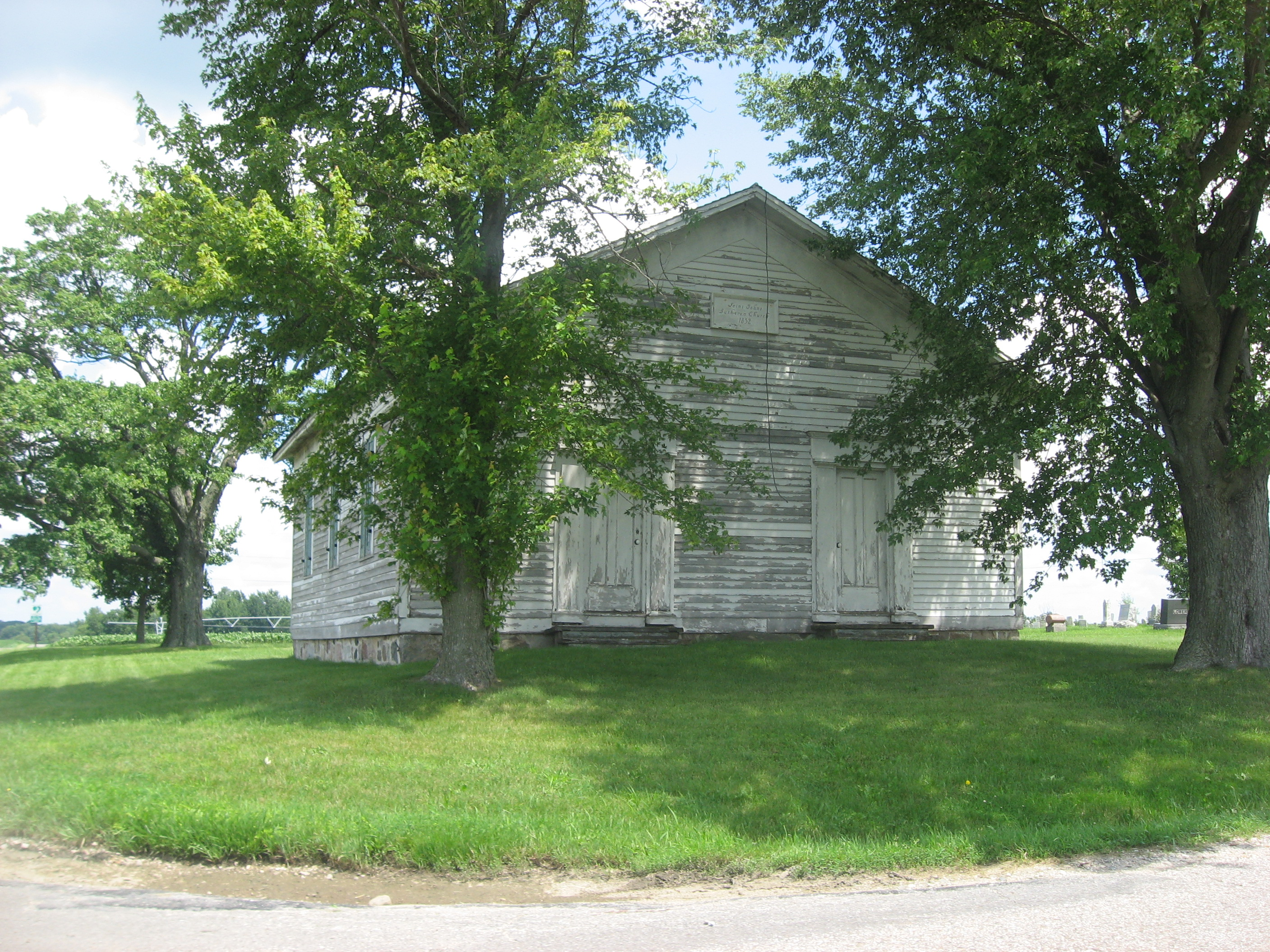
- St. John's Lutheran Church, July 2013

- Location within Indiana Location within the United States
- Location: Northeastern corner of the junction of County Roads 15 and 32, west of Goshen, Harrison Township, Elkhart County, Indiana
- Coordinates: 41°34′50″N 85°54′20″W
- Area: 1.5 acres (0.61 ha)
- Built: 1853
- Architect: Albert Galentine, George Apple
- Architectural style: Greek Revival
- NRHP reference No.: 94001349
- Added to NRHP: November 25, 1994

St. John's Lutheran Church is a historic former Lutheran church located in Harrison Township, Elkhart County, Indiana. It was built in 1852–1853 by Albert Galentine on land owned by John Rarick Sr., who deeded the land to the "Evangelical Lutheran Church" in 1855. Services at the church ended in 1894 after John Rarick Jr., the congregation's largest financial supporter, moved to the Elkhart area.

A one-story, Greek Revival style frame meeting house, the building measures 31 feet (9.4 m) wide by 35 feet (11 m) deep. It has eight shuttered windows and separate entrances for men and women. The property also includes the contributing church cemetery.

The cemetery and building are owned by the St. John's Cemetery Association. The church and its cemetery were added to the National Register of Historic Places in 1994.

On July 1, 2014, a storm with straight-line winds tore the eastern half of the roof off the church, dumping the debris onto the lawn and an adjacent corn field. Several tombstones were also toppled or broken off. Volunteers placed a tarp over the structure until a permanent repair could be made. Repairs were delayed because the St. John's Cemetery Association had been legally dissolved in 2009. Papers were finally signed on October 1, 2014, to give Harrison Township ownership. The township planned to obtain donations and grants to effect the repairs.
