= The Barns at Nappanee =

Tourist attraction in Nappanee, IN, US

Coordinates: 41.444°N 86.020°W

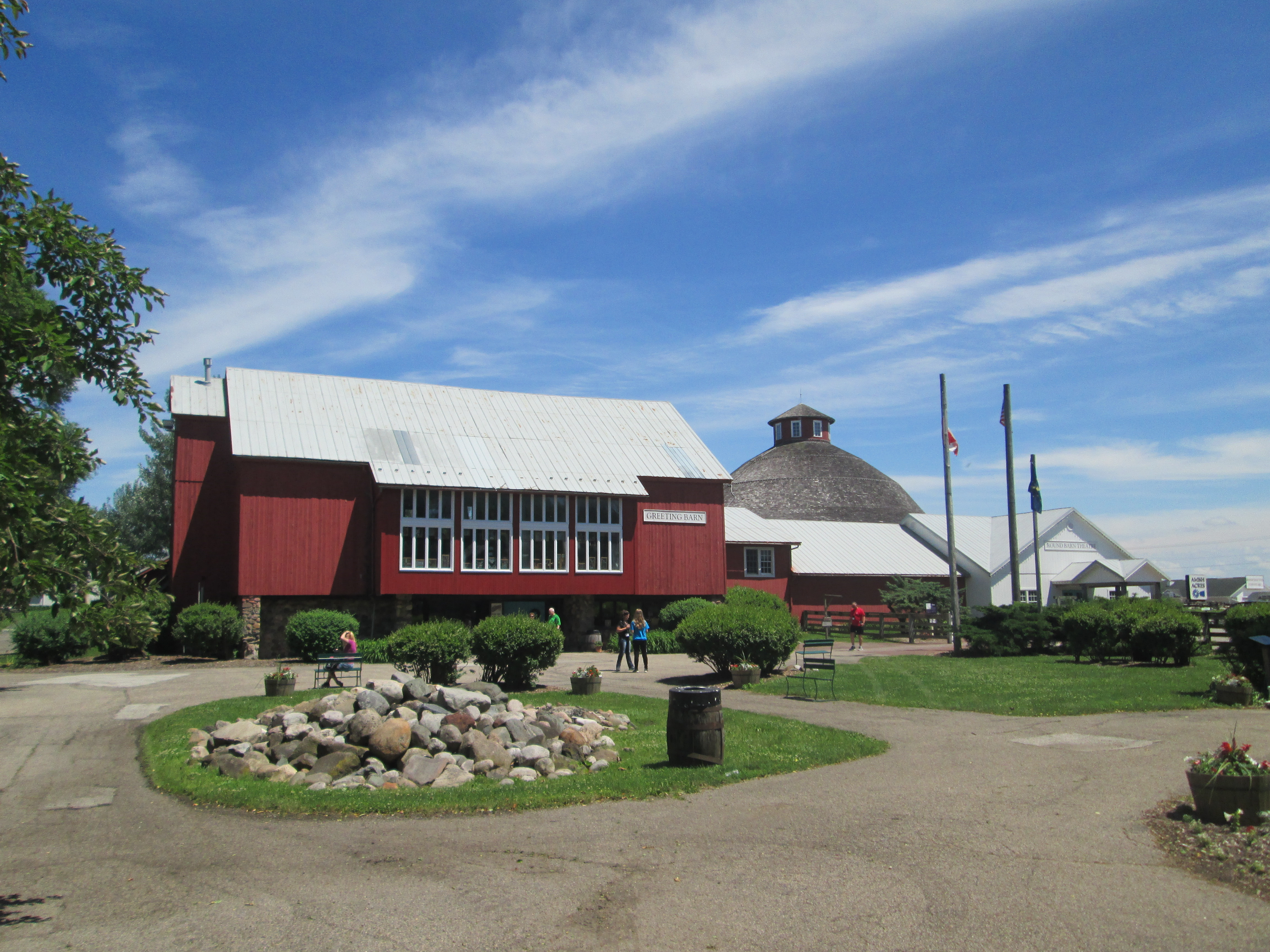
Amish Acres from the entrance.

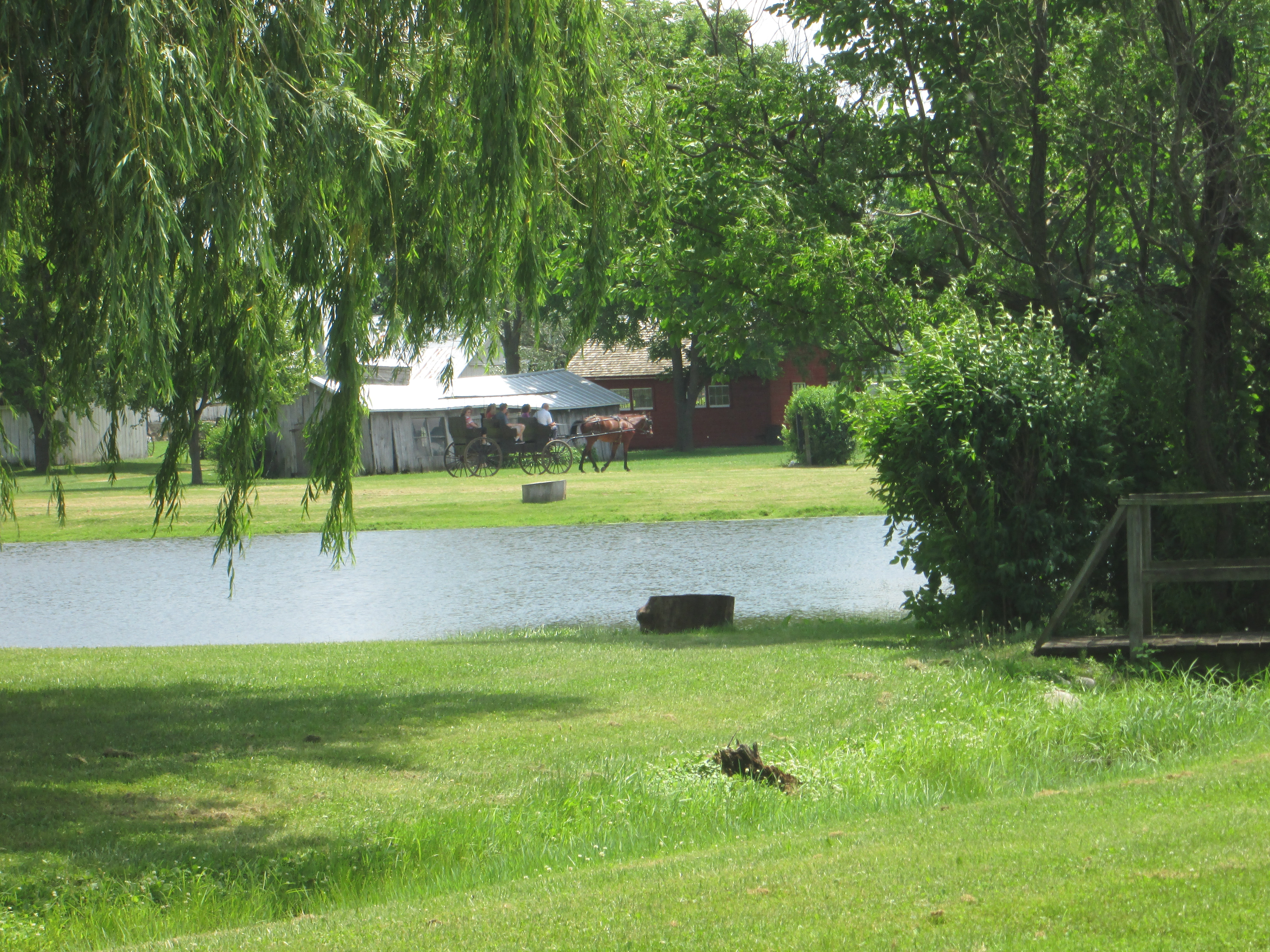
Riding a wagon at Amish Acres.

The Barns at Nappanee, Home of Amish Acres, formerly known solely as Amish Acres, is a tourist attraction in Nappanee, Indiana, created from an eighty-acre (thirty-two-hectare) Old Order Amish farm. The farm was purchased in October 1968 at auction from the Manasses Kuhns’ estate. The farm was homesteaded by Moses Stahly in 1873. Moses was the son of pioneer Christian Stahly who emigrated from Germany with his widowed mother Barbara and three brothers to the southwest corner of Elkhart County in 1839; making them, perhaps, the earliest Amish settlers in Indiana.

Amish Acres opened to the public in June 1970 after more than a year of restoration. The complex grew to include the original nine buildings, two relocated log buildings, an ice house, a mint distillery, a maple sugar camp, an apple cider mill, a one-room school, and a blacksmith shop. Three bank barns and the Round Barn Theatre have also been moved to the property. The original farmstead is listed in the National Register of Historic Places.

Amish Acres featured guided house and farm tours, a narrated wagon ride, domestic craft demonstrations, a 400-seat family style restaurant, a 200-seat Barn Loft Grill, 400-seat repertory musical theatre, the 64-room Inn at Amish Acres and 66-room Nappanee Inn.

Amish Acres closed at the end of 2019; The Barns at Nappanee restaurant and retail shop opened May 15, 2020, with other parts of the facility expected to open subsequently.

== History ==
A separate Amish settlement on the eastern side of the county began holding church services in 1841. The land granted to the Stahly brothers was nearly contiguous farms. Because of the tamarack swamp to the south of the Continental Divide and the heavily forested land to the north, it was the last part of the county settled by immigrants. The county was created in 1830 in Indiana out of the Indiana Territory following the creation of the State of Ohio. Colonel John Jackson was sent into the area to eradicate the Potawatomi Indians living in a village on the Elkhart River near present-day Baintertown. U.S. Government forces destroyed the abandoned village twice in the decade. Chief Five Medals had made two trips to Washington, D.C., to acquire federal grant money to help transition his village from hunter-gatherers into farmers, so as to live peacefully beside the arriving white settlers. The last of the Potawatomis were removed from Indiana by decree of the Indian Removal Act signed by President Andrew Jackson in 1830.

In 1873 the Baltimore, Ohio & Chicago Railroad surveyed a route from Sandusky, Ohio, to Chicago. In spite of intense lobbying from Goshen, Indiana, the county seat, the railroad chose a bee line route through the swamp and hardwoods hugging the north-south Continental Divide. The swamp was the headwaters of the Kankakee River basin, one of the largest fresh-water swamps left in the country at that time. Government drainage programs financed ditches and clay field tile that created some of the most fertile farmland in the Midwest. The timber to the north provided the natural resources for a sawmill industry that by 1885 had 20,000 logs in its yard. A planing mill began building wooden boxes that were shipped to Elkhart, Indiana, to package Dr. Miles' patent medicine, Nervine.

In 1893 the Moses Stahly family moved to Reno County, Kansas, as a result of the Windmill Controversy. It revolved around the introduction of windmills to pump water and manure spreaders and other mechanized horse-drawn farming implements. The more conservative Amish removed themselves from the area rather than adopt the modern machines. The Stahly farm was purchased by Noah Nisley, a cousin of Stahly's wife. The Nisley family came from Ohio where their house had recently burned. They built a near replica of their Ohio house on the farm, connecting it to the original two-room clapboard house. The Nisleys moved into the gross-daadi house upon retirement from active farming and son-in-law Manasses Kuhns took over the operation. The Stahly-Nissley-Kuhns farm is now listed in The National Register of Historic Places.

Through years of neglect due to Manasses Kuhns' debilitating illnesses, the farm fell into disrepair by the time of his death. Because of this neglect numerous original buildings long past their usefulness were spared destruction. These outbuildings include a food-drying house, outdoor brick bake oven, smoke house, root cellar, and apple cider mill. The orchard had been abandoned but left intact.

Owner and founder Richard Pletcher announced in November 2019 that Amish Acres would close at the end of 2019. He stated "It’s been 50 years so it’s a retirement. It will be closing after the fireworks on Dec. 31 and will be auctioned in the spring." It was auctioned in multiple parcels on February 7, 2020; multiple parties purchased the parcels, and the purchasers of the parcels with the main attractions, who include local former U.S. representative Marlin Stutzman, stated that they expected the attractions to reopen. Plans for the reopening were announced on March 4, 2020, with the projected date to be "about five weeks" from then; the "Amish Acres" "remain[ed] part of the property’s brand" as "The Barns at Nappanee, Home of Amish Acres". The LaSalle Farm & Table restaurant and The Mercantile store opened May 15, 2020 in limited function; the opening of other parts of the facility was delayed due to the COVID-19 pandemic.

In 2025 the Barns at Nappanee announced a scale back of operations.

== Concept ==
The concept of purchasing the farm and creating Amish Acres for the purpose of preserving and restoring the buildings and opening it to the public for guided tours with historical and cultural interpretation came from LaVern and Richard Pletcher, furniture merchants since 1933. The secondary purpose was to introduce and formalize Amish tourism in the Indiana city.

Restoration was completed by 1970 with the assistance of Fred Simic and Albert Kuhns, son of Manassas. Albert's vivid memory helped bring long-dormant buildings and mechanisms back into working order. The farm opened to the public on the second weekend in June 1970.

A master plan was drawn by architect Robert Holdeman of Traverse City, Michigan. Holdeman grew up in Elkhart County, and his roots remain in the Holdeman Mennonite Church near Wakarusa, Indiana. The plan has been executed closely over the decades and now includes the dining, lodging, and theatre programs originally envisioned.

The Pletchers incorporated Amish Acres after the successful bid with investors Freemon Borkholder, Ivo Heckaman, and Gordon McCormick. These investors were successful business entrepreneurs in Nappanee. Shortly after the opening of the farm, a dispute about Sunday opening led Mr. Borkholder, an Amish-Mennonite, to sell his interest in the project. Heckaman and McCormick were soon bought out and the Pletchers have continued to develop the attraction. Richard's daughter, Jennifer Wysong, is now president of the company.

Over half of Amish Acres visitors come from outside of Indiana, although many local constituencies are served by the restaurant, musical theatre, and arts and crafts festival.

Amish Acres has been recognized by Time, Newsweek, and U.S. News & World Report magazines for its contributions to reviving Nappanee's economy, early Internet retail selling, and the arts and crafts festival. Travel Trade Magazine has named Amish Acres Indiana's number one tourist attraction, and Mobil Travel Guide has listed Amish Acres as a must-see Midwest attraction, the only private entity on the list.

== Round Barn Theatre ==
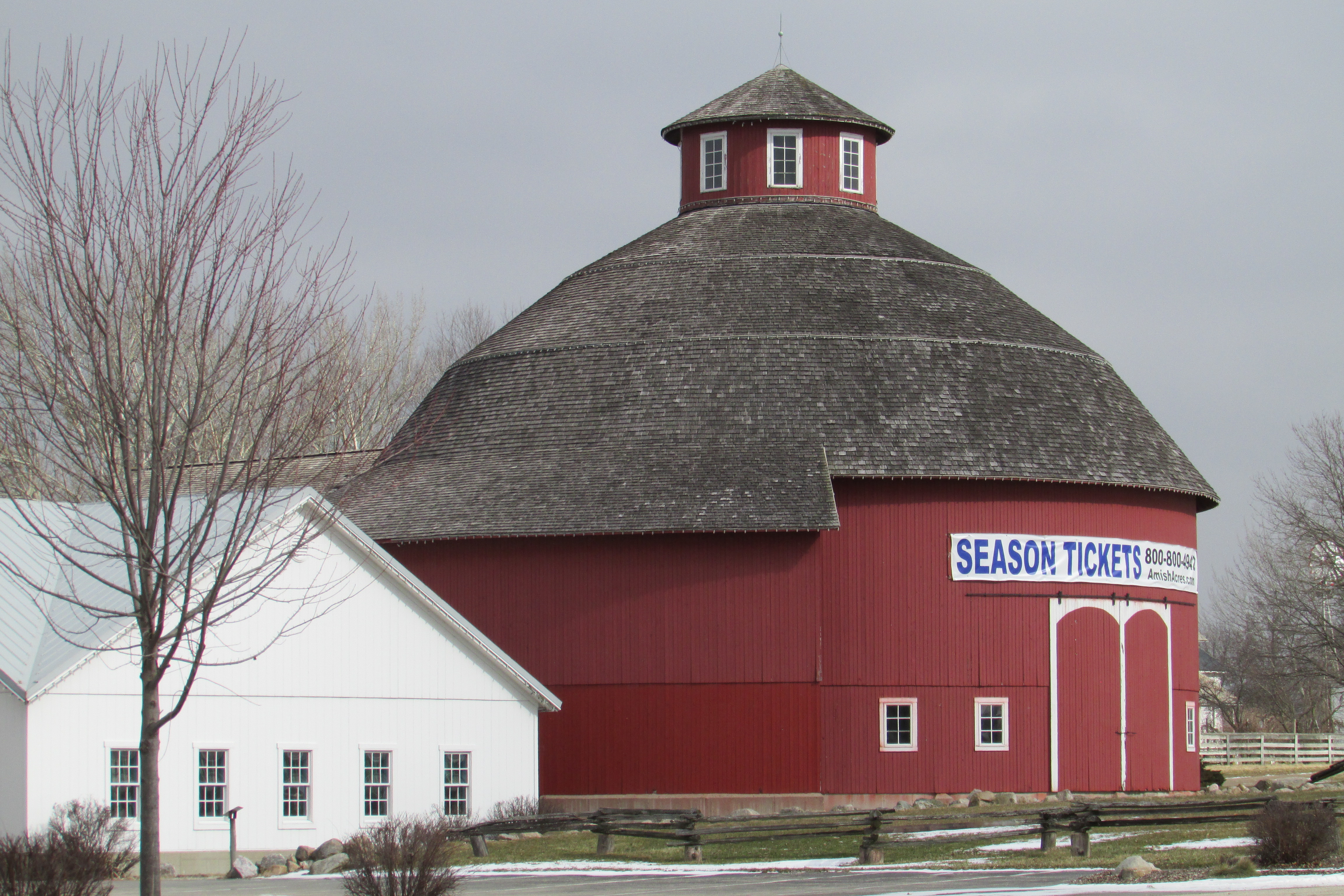
Round Barn Theater at Amish Acres, Nappanee, Indiana.

The Round Barn Theatre is the national home of Plain and Fancy, a 1955 Broadway musical about Amish life and love. It was the first musical for co-author Joseph Stein and composer Albert Hague. Each went on to win Tony Awards for, respectively, Fiddler on the Roof and Redhead. Amish Acres' production of the musical comedy had been running for 21 years in 2007. The musical began with of a cast of four and an upright piano in the Locke Township Meeting House, a replica building designed as a movie theatre, but has evolved into a classic production with a cast of nine on the proscenium stage of The Round Barn Theatre. The building was dismantled, reconstructed and converted to a state-of-the-art theatre seating 400 in 1992. In 1995 repertory theatre was added to Plain and Fancy in rotating performances in the same stage. The company is created from annual auditions held in New York City. Company and cast members are housed in three houses on Amish Acres' campus. A scenic shop, costume shop and rehearsal studio completed in 2006 have made way for The Joseph Stein Young Actors Studio, a series of classes and camps for children 8 to 12 years old and full productions put on by high school students.

This Wooden O, by Frank Ramirez with Richard Pletcher, was published in 2001 as a commemorative edition in celebration of the United States Postal Service dedication of the Amish Quilt commemorative stamps, the first of the American Heritage Series, with the first day issue from the Nappanee Post Office. Ninety-five million of the stamps were printed. The dedication ceremony was held in the Round Barn with a cast of Plain and Fancy alumni singing “Plain We Live,” the anthem from Plain and Fancy. In-house artist Jeff Stillson was commissioned by the postal service to design the cancellation.

== Arts and Crafts Festival ==
The Arts and Crafts Festival has evolved from a clothes line art exhibit begun in 1962 in front of the Pletcher Furniture Village in downtown Nappanee. Held during sidewalk days, the exhibit displayed the water colors created by the arts and crafts program from the parks and recreation department. Joseph Wrobble, well-known teaching artist from South Bend, Indiana, and Dory Crane, a Nappanee promoter, were instrumental in the early years of the event. Over the next several years vendors were allowed to sell their arts and crafts from booths along the city streets and alleys. Professional judges were employed to choose winning art work from entries. The festival expanded food offerings and added entertainment.

Visitors began asking for Amish-related products and services. Baked goods, meats, jams and jellies were added. Horse and buggy rides plus countryside tours were added to the festival. By 1968 the festival had taken on enough Amish flavors that it became in essence the feasibility study for the creation of Amish Acres. In 1969, during restoration of the farm, the festival remained downtown. Visitors were shuttled to the farm for preview tours. An Amish church held a homemade ice cream social in the bank barn. A year later the festival was moved to the courtyard of the farm which included the original relocated barn that became Amish Acres' first restaurant. As the festival grew and the number of booths expanded into the farm's orchard, the marketplace was relocated to surround the pond. There it remains with nearly 350 vendors from over 35 states participating each year and competing for over $10,000 in cash prizes. Three stages are filled with continuous entertainment.

The festival has been named one of the Top 100 Events in North America by the American Bus Association in 2003, 2006, and 2008. It has been in Sunshine Artist magazine's Top 200 Shows since its inception, ranking as high as the number 3 traditional arts and crafts show in the nation.
