= Stahly–Nissley–Kuhns Farm =

- U.S. National Register of Historic Places
- U.S. Historic district
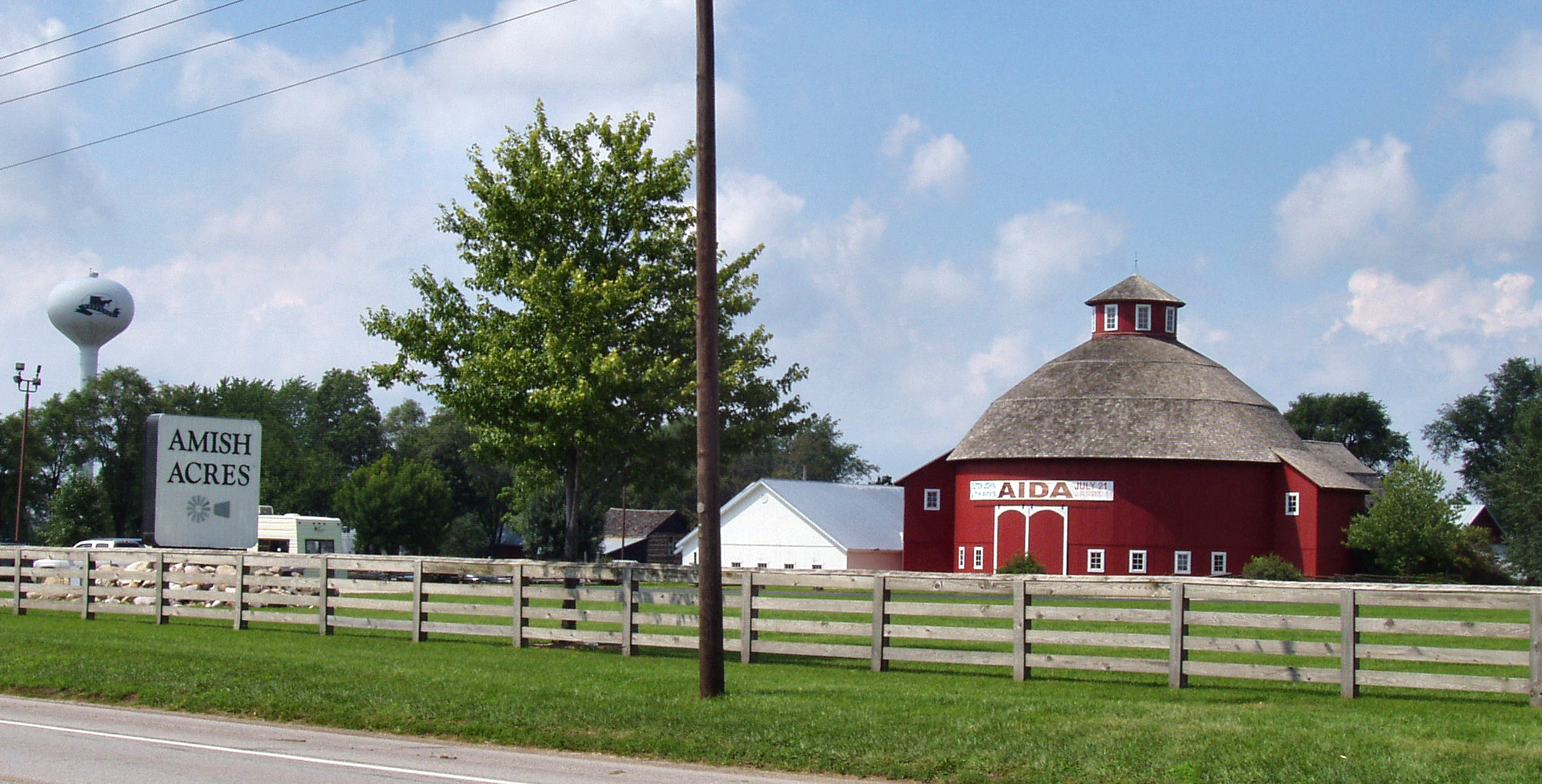
- Amish Acres

- Location within Indiana Location within the United States
- Location: 1600 W. Market St., Nappanee, Indiana
- Coordinates: 41°26′39″N 86°1′2″W
- Area: 2.1 acres (0.85 ha)
- Architect: Multiple
- Architectural style: Bank barn
- NRHP reference No.: 90001793
- Added to NRHP: November 29, 1990

The Stahly–Nissley–Kuhns Farm is a historic farm located at Nappanee, Indiana. Nappanee was established in 1874. The Farm is part of Amish Acres, which includes the old farmstead and additional structures brought in to show Amish life.

The Kuhns farm includes the farmhouse, a bank barn, a windmill, a "grossdaadi haus," (grandfather house), an outhouse, a food drying house, a bake oven, a smokehouse, a root cellar, a hoghouse, and a garden plot. Associated with the farmstead is a cider mill, which was operated by the Kuhns family. The mill building was moved onto the property by the family around 1900. The mill is not a part of the historic area because it was moved onto the property. The garden plot is a site. The windmill and root cellar are structures, which were supportive of human activities. The windmill was used to generate power; the root cellar was related to food storage.

Closely associated with the farmstead is a cider mill, which was operated by the Kuhns family. The mill building was moved onto the property by the family around the turn of the century. It has remained in the same location and has a high degree of integrity. It has not, however, been included in this nomination. The mill's physical relationship with the rest of the farmstead is diminished because of the buildings which have been moved onto the property.

== House ==
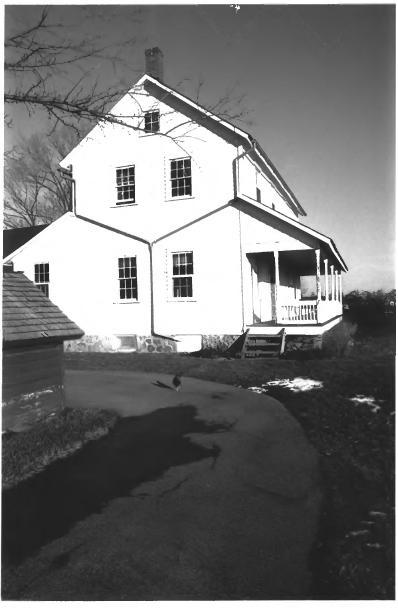
Farmhouse on the Stahly–Nissley–Kuhns Farm, Amish Acres, Nappanee, Indiana

The house was built in several stages. The first portion was constructed in 1893. It is a two-story wood structure with four bays and a side gable. The roof covered with diamond shaped slate. There are two chimneys, both inside the house frame. One is located at the west end and the other in the center. The house has a field stone foundation and clapboard siding. There is a one-story shed roof porch on the front. Second floor windows are regularly spaced. Windows on the first story do not line up with second story windows. The house has plain corner boards and fascias.

The kitchen is on the west side of the stair; the living room is on the east. A medicine cabinet is located in the living room is typical of an Amish house. There are hooks on a board several feet from the floor all around the living room. These were for the use of Amish neighbors who gathered here on Sunday when it was the family's turn to host services. A grille in the ceiling sends heat to the room above.

Off the kitchen is a pantry. Off the living room is the master bedroom. This tiny bedroom has an east window with a view of the barn. On the west wall of the room is a door, which exits onto the rear porch. On the second floor, there is a narrow hall on the west side of the stairs. On the west side of the hall, on the south side of the house, there is a guest room. This, the house's largest bedroom, has bracketed shelves, intended for the display of objects. It is the only room in the house with this feature. On the west side of the hall is a walk-in closet, the only closet in the house. On the east side of the hall are two other bedrooms. The room to the west were used for laundry, dyeing, and other domestic activities. The south and east walls of this room, originally exterior walls have clapboard siding. There is no ceiling; rafters and roof sheathing can be seen overhead. The floor is wood.

There are wood floors and plaster ceilings and walls throughout the house. The southernmost room of the gable roof rear section of the house is a milk house. Inside this room, on the south wall, is a stone trough. The floor is dirt.

There is a shed roof, one story section on the north side of the two-story section. The central section is open. This open section, or porch, has doors leading into the kitchen, cellar, master bedroom, and west addition. There is a pump for drawing water from a well located under the porch.

Extending from the west end is a one-story shed roof addition with a concrete foundation constructed in the 1920s. This addition adjoins an earlier, east section, and consists of three rooms. The two southernmost rooms comprise the original house, built by Moses Stahly in 1874. The third room was added later. The south room of the original house was converted to a milk house at some point.

== Grossdaadi haus ==
South of the main house is the grossdaadi haus. It is a one and a half-story frame structure. The house has a gable roof-with wood shingles. There is a brick chimney on the top of the gable. The house has two additions, one the west side and one to the back. It also has clapboard siding. It was moved from Nappanee and is thought to have been built between 1874 and the 1910s, when Noah Nisley and his wife moved into it.

== Farm buildings ==
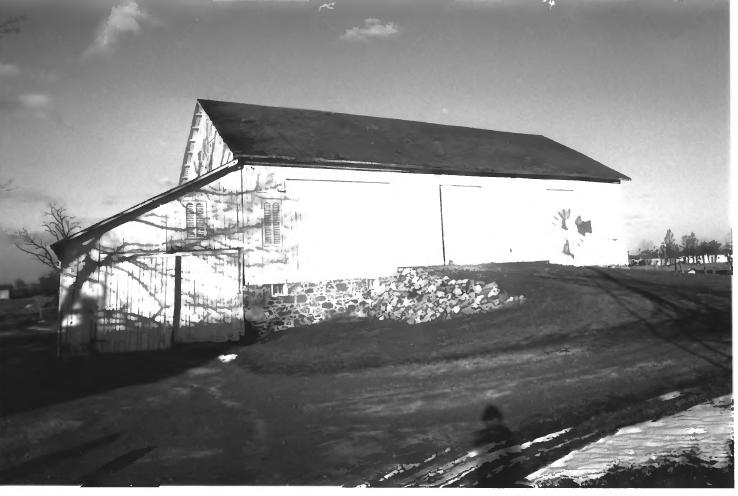
Stahly Bank Barn, Stahly–Nissley–Kuhns Farm, Amish Acres, Indiana

Northeast of the main house is a large bank barn. It has a gable roof with wood shingles. Siding is vertical wood planks. The foundation is field stone with a hand hewn beams. The trees used were cut on the farm. A threshing floor is on the top floor. On the ground floor are stables and milking stalls. On the west end of the barn, there is a shed roof addition which contains a corn crib and wagon shed.

There is a windmill constructed in the 1920s, south of the barn.

West of the house are three small outbuildings. They are the food drying house, the bake oven, and the smoke house. Each is a frame structure with a front gable roof and wood shingles. The food-drying house has beveled horizontal siding. There are shallow drawers for the food to be dried. The smokehouse and bake oven have vertical wood siding. All three buildings appear to be from about 1900.

To the west of the food drying house is a wood frame outhouse with a front gable roof, wood shingles on the roof and horizontal wood siding. It appears to date from about 1900.

North of the smoke house is a root cellar built into the ground. It uses field stone for the walls and an earthen roof.

The hoghouse, north of the main house, has a concrete foundation, a standing seam metal, gable roof, and vertical board siding. It was constructed in the early part of the century.

== Garden ==
The garden plot is south of the food drying house and the outhouse. The garden is planted with herbs, and rows of vegetables. Alternating rows contain flowers.

== Significance ==
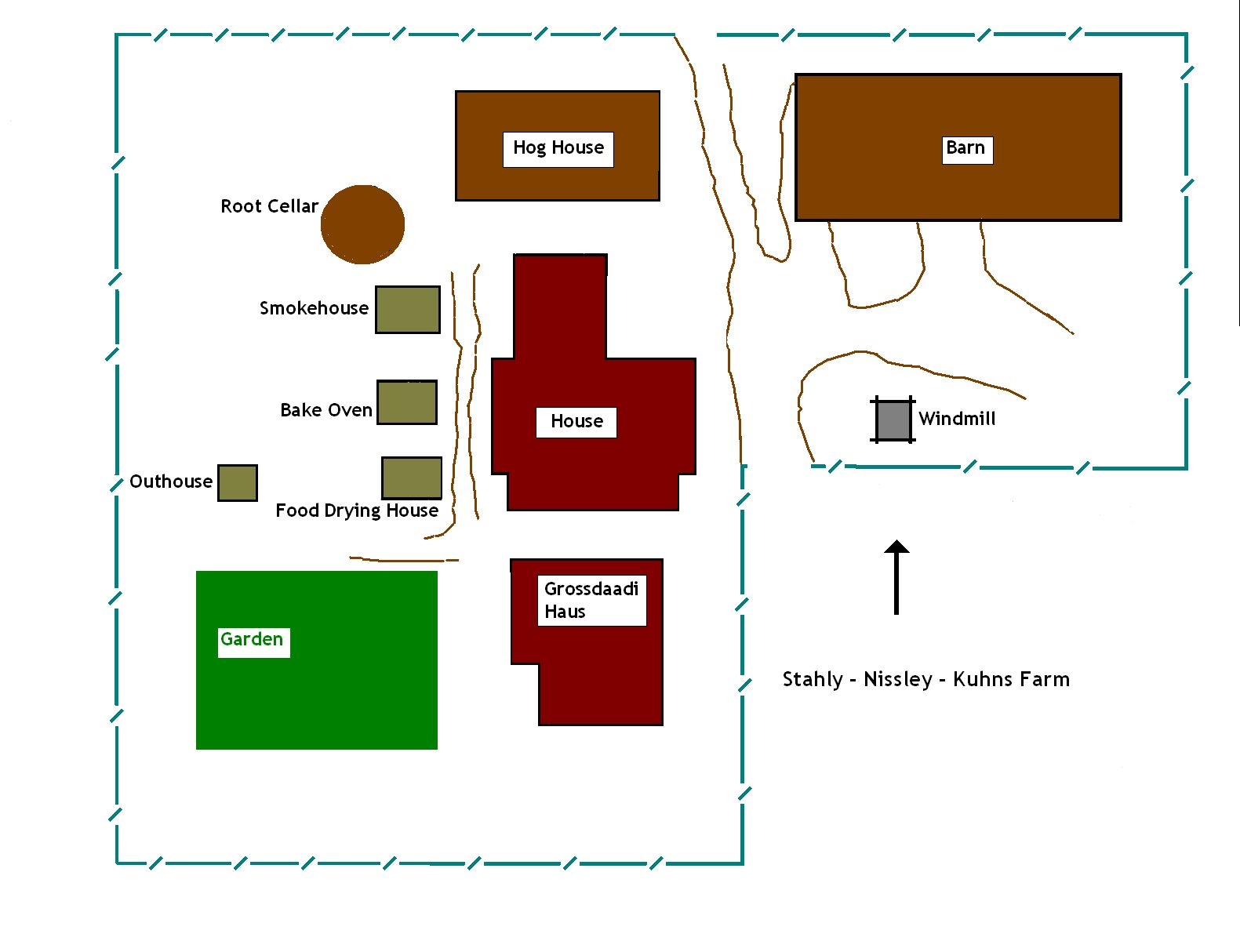
Farm plan of the Stahly–Nissley–Kuhns Farm at Amish Acres, Indiana. Based on the plan provided in the nomination documents for the Nat'l Register of Hist. Places.

The Farm represents the lifestyle of the Nappanee-area Amish during the late 19th and early 20th century. The structures themselves are illustrative of the simple architecture favored by the Amish.

The Stahly–Nissley–Kuhns Farm is perhaps the best representation of an old Amish farm in the Nappanee area Amish settlement. The vast majority of Amish farms in the Nappanee area have been altered to some degree in the name of home improvement. Many have aluminum or some other type of synthetic siding. Some of the farm properties have intrusions in the form of new buildings to house motorized vehicles and modern farm equipment, which are gradually becoming accepted among many Amish groups.

The Indiana Historic Sites and Structures Inventory for Elkhart County (1976) identified two Amish farms in the Nappanee area. These are the Stahly–Nissley–Kuhns Farm, and the Schmucker Farm, located across the road. The Stahly–Nissley–Kuhns Farm now operates as a farm museum and is part of a development known as Amish Acres.

== Bibliography ==
- "Amish–Beachy–Conservative Nappanee Community Directory." Volume II. Nappanee, Indiana, 1978. Chapman, Charles C. and Company. History of Elkhart County Indiana. Chicago: Charles C. Chapman and Company, 1881.
- Goshen Daily Democrat. Atlas and Plat Book of Elkhart County, Indiana. Rockford, Illinois: The Thrift Press, 1929.
- Higgins, Beldon and Co. An Illustrated Historical Atlas of Elkhart County, Indiana. Chicago: Higgins, Beldon and Co., 1874.
- Indiana Department of Natural Resources. Indiana Historic Sites and Structures Inventory, 1976.
- Landing, James E. "The Spatial Development and Organization of an Old Order Amish-Beachy Araish Settlement: Nappanee, Indiana." Ph.D. dissertation, The Pennsylvania State University, 1967.
- Ogle, George A. and Company. Plat Book of Elkhart County, Indiana. Chicago: George A. Ogle and Company, 1892.
- Ogle, George A. and Company. Standard Ailafi. a£ Elkhart County . Indiana . Chicago: George A. Ogle and Company, 1915
- Wenger, John Christian. The Mennonites in Indiana and Michigan. Scottdale, Pennsylvania: Herald Press, 1961.
