= Nappanee Eastside Historic District =

Historic district in Indiana, United States

- U.S. National Register of Historic Places
- U.S. Historic district
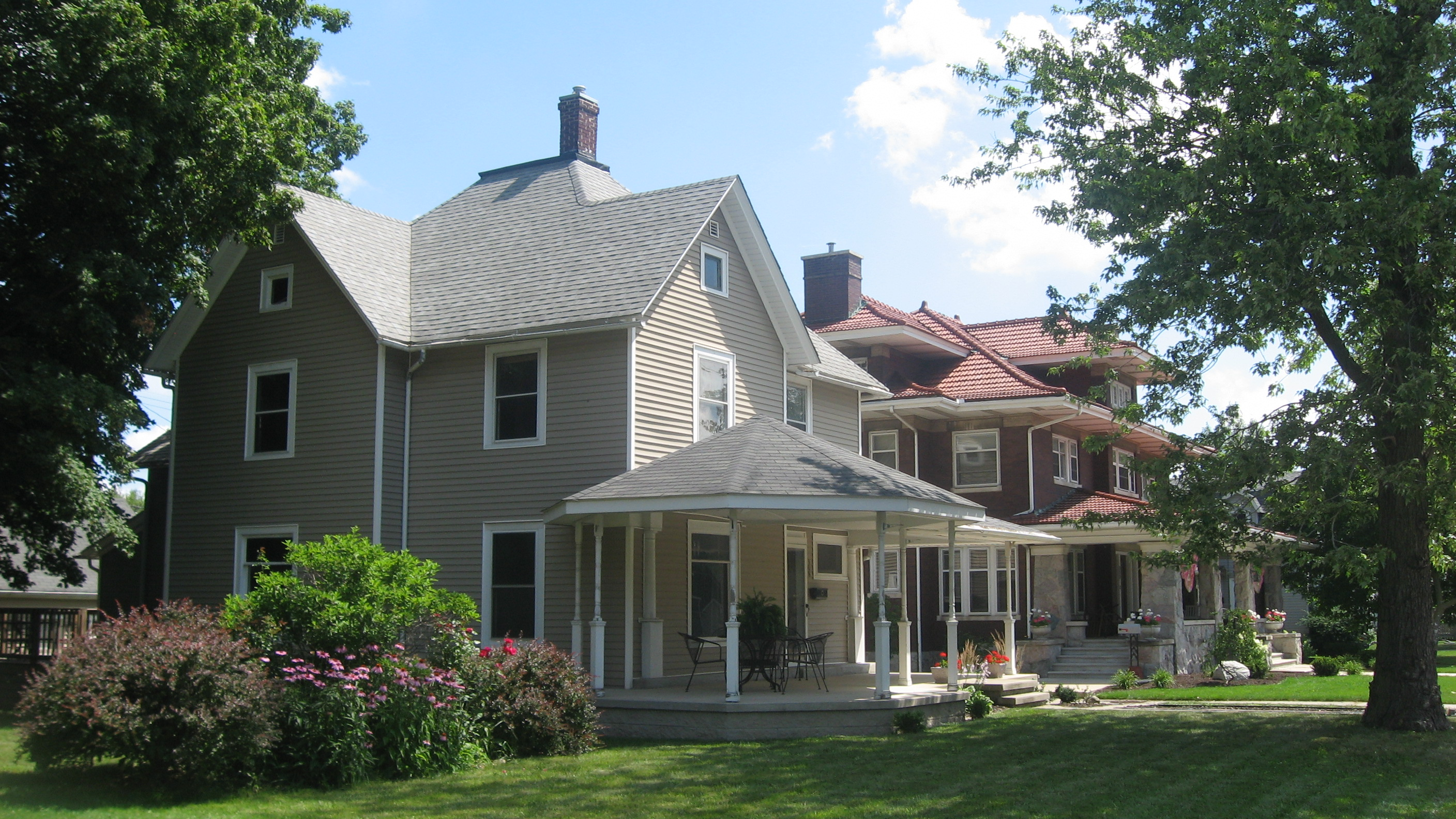
- Berlin and Coppes Houses, Nappanee.jpg

- Location within Indiana Location within the United States
- Location: Roughly bounded by Market, Main, John and Summit Sts., Nappanee, Indiana
- Coordinates: 41°26′39″N 85°59′52″W
- Area: 55 acres (22 ha)
- Architect: Frazier, Henry F and Clarence Elbert; Turnock, E Hill
- Architectural style: Late Victorian, Late 19th And 20th Century Revivals, Prairie School
- NRHP reference No.: 03001321
- Added to NRHP: December 23, 2003

Nappanee Eastside Historic District is a national historic district located at Nappanee, Indiana. The district encompasses 138 contributing buildings in a predominantly residential section of Nappanee. It was developed between about 1880 and 1940, and includes notable examples of Italianate, Queen Anne, Colonial Revival, and Prairie School style architecture. Located in the district are the separately listed Frank and Katharine Coppes House and Arthur Miller House.

It was added to the National Register of Historic Places in 2003.

== Significant Homes ==
- 356 E. Marion St; Fred Coppes House, c. 1912 one-story Japanese influenced Craftsman bungalow and detached garage. The structures has a pagoda-like gable roofs with decorative peaks and flared eaves, and projecting timbers. The house has a symmetrical front facade with a central gabled entry.
- 458 E. Van Buren St; Karl Freese, Jr. House. 1937 two-story, three-bay, brick Colonial Revival with brick foundation, gable roof, small portico entry with Doric-like columns and pilasters, brick lintels and sills, and casement windows. A one-story garage is attached to the east facade.
- 252 E. Walnut St; Lamar Mutschler House. 1924 two-story brick and stucco Mediterranean Revival with a stone foundation, hip roof, covered front terrace, porte-cochère, and sun room. The ground-story windows have a diamond shaped pane in the upper sash, and two panes on the lower sash. Round windows flank the entry door. The upper story windows are eight-over-one double-hung.
- 258 E. Walnut St; Albert Mutschler House, 1910 three-story combination Prairie and Colonial Revival with cut stone foundation, stucco walls (added to wood siding in 1924), clay tile hip roof with three hip dormers, wide eaves, and both double-hung and single paned casement windows. The open porch has groupings of Ionic columns.
- 351 E. Walnut St; Luella “Muzzy" Slipher House. 1936 two-story brick and aluminum sided combination English Cottage and Tudor Revival with an irregular slate roof, prominent full-facade front gable, central chimney, and casement windows.
- 258 E. Market St; John Coppes House/Nappanee Masonic Temple. 1895 three-story Queen Anne with irregular roof that has several projecting gables, two square towers (one with pyramidal roof, one with Mansard), cut stone foundation, wood shingle siding, wood corbelling, brackets, sunburst pattern, and double-hung windows with wood surrounds. Historically had porte-cochère like connection to neighboring Daniel Zook House.

- 302 E. Market St; Frank and Katherine Coppes House/Victorian Guest House Bed and Breakfast, 1887 two and one-half story Queen Anne with cut stone foundation, clapboard and shingle siding, hip roof with projecting gables, small brackets, and large corner tower with a recessed balcony. Windows include stained glass, and single pane fixed sash.
- 352 E. Market St; Harvey Coppes House, 1910 two and one-half story Arts and Crafts with a cut stone foundation, brick walls with stone lintels and sills, clay tile hip roof with three hip dormers, large open stone porch, and both single pane casement and double-hung windows.
- 508-10 E. Market St; c.1880 two-story Italianate with brick walls and foundation, low-pitched pyramidal roof, thin decorative wood cornice, and small porch. Ground-story windows are under segmental arches. Second-story windows are under raised brick segmental arches.
- 201 E. Market St; Baptist Church/Former United Brethren Church. 1928 two-story over a raised basement Twentieth Century Functional church structure with concrete foundation, brick walls and limestone details. The flat roof has an entablature with dentil molding. The entry porch is juxtaposed at a 45-degree angle on the northwest corner, and has a flat roof and pediment-like parapet. Windows are stained glass, and obscured glass.
- 251 E. Market St; George Fales House, c.1925 two-story Classical Revival with poured concrete foundation, brick walls, hip roof, open porch with fluted Ionic columns and pilasters, and double-hung windows.
- 253 E. Market St; Arthur Miller House/Market Street Guest House, c.1925 two and one-half story Colonial Revival with limestone foundation, brick walls with limestone details, gable roof with three gable dormers, and double hung windows. The open porch had fluted Ionic pilasters and columns. The east facade has an enclosed sun porch, and there is a Palladian window on the south facade.
- 401 E. Market St; Coppes Factory Office, c. 1905 single-story Queen Anne with rusticated stone foundation, brick, carboard, and clapboard siding, jerkin-head roof, and one-over-one double-hung windows with wood surrounds.
- 451 E. Market St; Coppes Furniture Factory, c. 1876-1950 multiple structure manufacturing complex. The central c.1885 and the western c.1905 section have brick foundation and walls, brick cornice, stone lintels, and flat roofs. The middle section has double-hung windows with segmental arches, and the western section has thirty-paned casements. The one and three story eastern c. 1955 brick showroom/office section has large plate glass windows and a flat roof.
- 302 N. Main St; G. F. Brown/Aerial Warren House. 1902 two and one-half story Queen Anne with rusticated stone foundation, clapboard siding, shingle siding in the gables, steep pitch gable roof with projecting gable on front facade with returns and brackets, open front porch with wood columns, and double-hung windows.
- 408 N. Main St; Harold Zook-Irwin Coppes House, c. 1910 Prairie with limestone foundation, stucco walls, hip roof, and open hip roof entry porch. A wood band runs between the first and second stories. Ground-story windows are single-pane casements, and second-story leaded casements (in Tree of Life design) in ribbons of three and four.
- 201 N. Madison St; Carlyle Mutschler House. 1935 two-story Tudor Revival with limestone foundation, stone walls, stone sills, stone lintel over entry, gable roof with projecting gables, copper gutters, and six, eight, and multi-paned casement windows.
- 401 N. Hartman St: Karl Freese Sr. House. 1910 American Foursquare with limestone foundation, stucco walls, hip roof with low-pitched hip dormer, open porch, and both one-over-one double-hung and single pane fixed sash.
