= Joseph J. Rohrer Farm =

- U.S. National Register of Historic Places
- U.S. Historic district
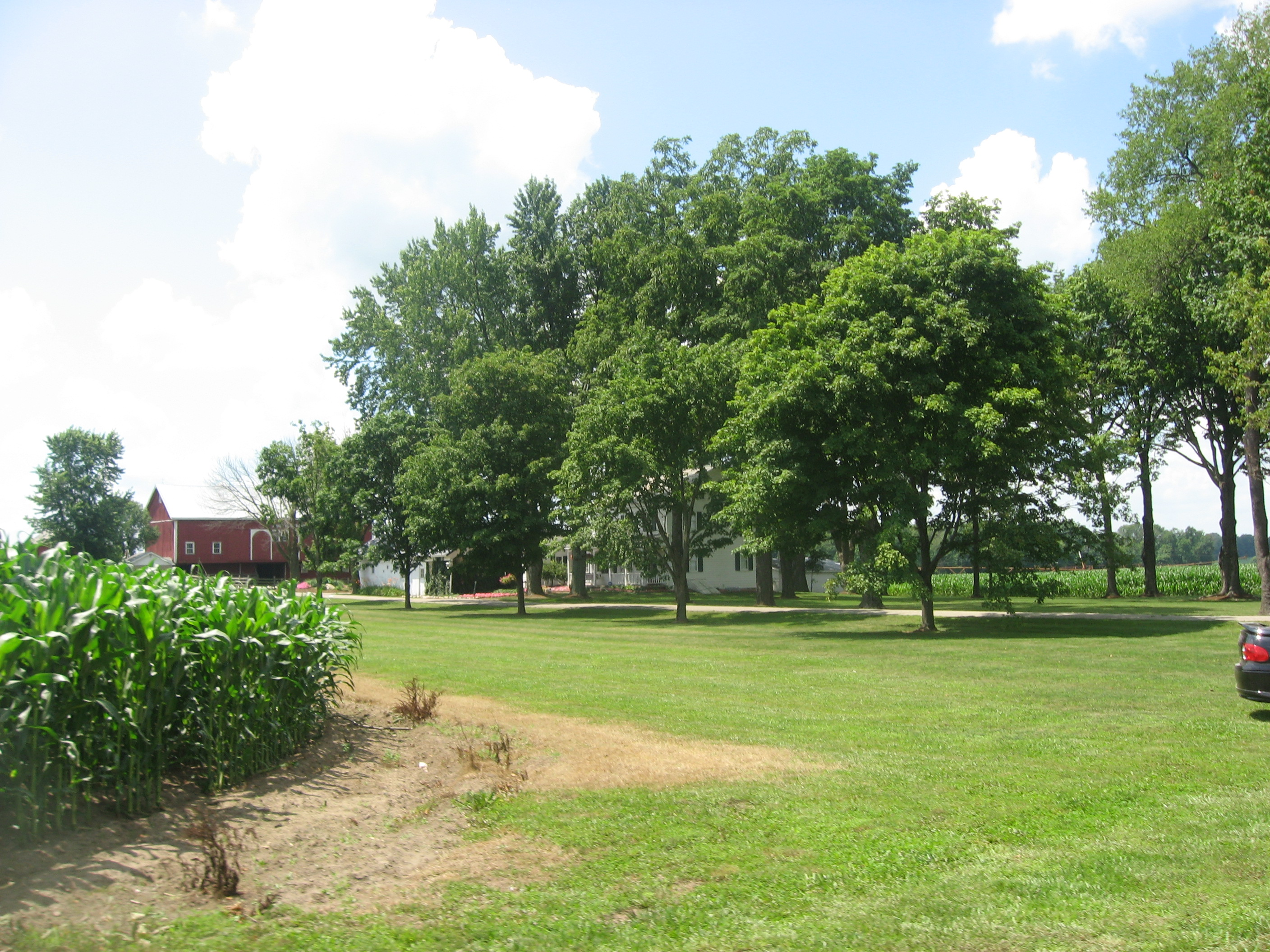
- Joseph J. Rohrer Farm, July 2013

- Location within Indiana Location within the United States
- Location: 24394 County Road 40, southwest of Goshen, Harrison Township, Elkhart County, Indiana
- Coordinates: 41°32′41″N 85°55′57″W
- Area: 2.3 acres (0.93 ha)
- Built: c. 1854-1900
- Architectural style: Federal, Bank barn
- NRHP reference No.: 90000330
- Added to NRHP: February 23, 1990

Joseph J. Rohrer Farm, also known as Rohrer Place, is a historic farm and national historic district located in Harrison Township, Elkhart County, Indiana. The house was built in 1858, and is a two-story, three-bay, frame dwelling with Federal style design elements. It has a side gable slate roof and full-width front porch. The property also includes the contributing old house (c. 1854), bank barn (1861), chicken house, smokehouse, and corn crib.

It was added to the National Register of Historic Places in 1990.
