= Frank and Katharine Coppes House =

Historic house in Indiana, United States

- U.S. National Register of Historic Places
- U.S. Historic district – Contributing property
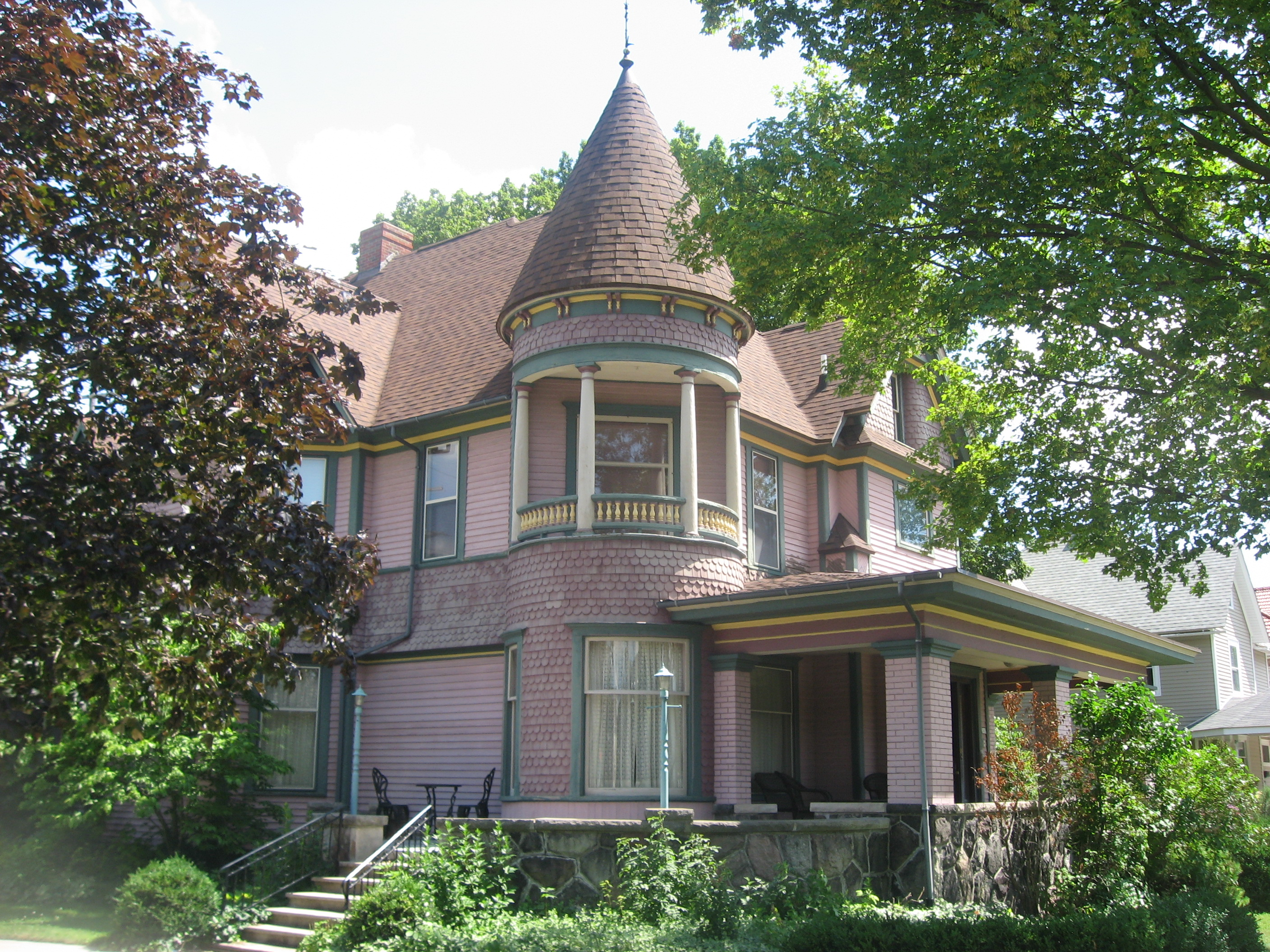
- Frank and Katharine Coppes House, July 2013

- Location within Indiana Location within the United States
- Location: 302 E. Market St., Nappanee, Indiana
- Coordinates: 41°26′35″N 85°59′55″W
- Area: less than one acre
- Built: 1887–1893
- Architect: Frazier, Henry
- Architectural style: Queen Anne
- NRHP reference No.: 90001783
- Added to NRHP: November 29, 1990

Frank and Katharine Coppes House, also known as the Victorian Guest House, is a historic home located at Nappanee, Indiana. It was built between 1887 and 1893, and is a 2 1/2-story, Queen Anne style frame dwelling. It has a complex hipped and gable roof and features a two-story, round corner tower with a conical roof and second story porch. It has a one-story wraparound porch and sheathed in clapboard and fish scale shingles.

It was added to the National Register of Historic Places in 1990. It is located in the Nappanee Eastside Historic District.

== History ==
Construction on the house was started in 1887 and completed in 1893. It is the work of local architect, Henry Frazier, who also designed the Dietrich Block, and Price Hospital (both extant). Frazier designed "most of the good homes of capitalists of Nappanee", as well as structures in Bremen, Goshen, and other nearby towns. Frazier, born in 1849, was a teacher and carpenter, becoming an architect in 1887. The house has an irregular plan, exhibiting elements of the Queen Anne style, i.e.; as protruding bays, variously sized and shaped windows, a round tower, sunburst motives, and fish scale shingles. The interior of the house is equally elaborate, with heavy oak paneling and woodwork, stained glass windows, glass pocket doors, and many original bathroom fixtures and tiles. The house retains a high degree of integrity.

The home of Frank's brother, John, is located across Madison Street to the west. Like the Frank and Katharine Coppes House, the John Coppes House is an elaborate Victorian-era structure. However, its integrity is diminished because of the addition of synthetic siding and a number of interior alterations. The house of another brother, Samuel, was demolished in the 1930s. Frank Coppes was an early and important citizen of Nappanee.

== Bibliography ==
- Bloomfield, Virginia, "Recollections of the Victorian Home (1893------) Built by Frank Coppes along with a brief history of the family by Granddaughter Virginia Coppes Bloomfield."
- Unpublished manuscript, April 1989, Citizens Historical Association, "Frank Coppes, President, Coppes, Inc., East Market Street, Nappanee, Indiana." Indianapolis, Indiana, April 23, 1938.
- Coppes, Katharine Lucinda Felty. Obituary, September 7, 1942. Obituary File, Historical Room, Nappanee Public Library, Nappanee, Indiana.
- Deahl, Anthony. A Twentieth Century History and Biographical Record of Elkhart County. Indiana. Chicago: The Lewis Publishing Company, 1905.
- Keller Books 1 and 2. Albums of photographs, c. 1890–1910, taken by local resident, J.M. Keller. Historical Room, Nappanee Public Library, Nappanee, Indiana.
- Leksich, Kris. Nappanee, Indiana. Interview, January 30, 1989.
- Weygand, James L., et al. "They Called it Nappanee. A History 1874–1974."
