= Buescher Band Instrument Company Building =

- Formerly listed on the U.S. National Register of Historic Places
- Location: 225 E. Jackson Ave., Elkhart, Indiana
- Area: 3.1 acres (1.3 ha)
- NRHP reference No.: 86002714

Significant dates
- Added to NRHP: September 22, 1986
- Removed from NRHP: June 21, 1996

Buescher Band Instrument Company Building, also known as the Buescher Building, was a historic factory building located at Elkhart, Indiana. The original section was built in 1904, with additions made in 1909, 1914, 1920, 1922, 1923, and 1946. It was a two-story, "U-shaped, painted brick building. It has been demolished.

It was added to the National Register of Historic Places in 1986 and delisted in 1996.
