= York Township, Elkhart County, Indiana =

York Township
- Township
- Location of York Township in Elkhart County
- Coordinates: 41°43′38″N 85°43′07″W
- Country: United States
- State: Indiana
- County: Elkhart

Government
  - Type: Indiana township

Area
  - Total: 25.54 sq mi (66.1 km^{2})
  - Land: 25.31 sq mi (65.6 km^{2})
  - Water: 0.23 sq mi (0.60 km^{2})
- Elevation: 814 ft (248 m)

Population (2020)
  - Total: 4,291
  - Density: 147.3/sq mi (56.9/km^{2})
- FIPS code: 18-85976
- GNIS feature ID: 454068

Historical population
| Census | Pop. | Note | %± |
|---|---|---|---|
| 1920 | 572 | | — |
| 1930 | 544 | | −4.9% |
| 1940 | 624 | | 14.7% |
| 1950 | 675 | | 8.2% |
| 1960 | 839 | | 24.3% |
| 1970 | 1,471 | | 75.3% |
| 1980 | 2,316 | | 57.4% |
| 1990 | 2,947 | | 27.2% |
| 2000 | 3,429 | | 16.4% |
| 2010 | 3,728 | | 8.7% |
| 2020 | 4,291 | | 15.1% |
U.S. Census:

York Township is one of sixteen townships in Elkhart County, Indiana. As of the 2010 census, its population was 3,728.

== History ==
York Township was named after the state of New York, the point of origin of many of its early settlers.

Bonneyville Mill was added to the National Register of Historic Places in 1976.

== Geography ==
According to the 2010 census, the township has a total area of 25.54 square miles (66.1 km^{2}), of which 25.31 square miles (65.6 km^{2}) (or 99.10%) is land and 0.23 square miles (0.60 km^{2}) (or 0.90%) is water. Hunter Lake is in this township.

=== Unincorporated towns ===
- Bonneyville Mills
- Vistula

=== Major highways ===
- I-80
- I-90
- Indiana Toll Road
- US 131
- SR 13
- SR 120

=== Cemeteries ===
The township contains one cemetery, Bonneyville.
