= Jacob Luitjens =

Dutch Nazi collaborator (1919–2022)

- Born: 18 April 1919; Buitenzorg, Dutch East Indies
- Died: 14 December 2022 (aged 103); Lemmer, Netherlands
- Other name: Gerhard Harder
- Known for: Nazi collaborator

Jacob Luitjens (18 April 1919 – 14 December 2022) was a Dutch collaborator during World War II. He was nicknamed the terror of Roden, as he was active in and around Roden in the Drenthe Province. He was born in Buitenzorg, Dutch East Indies.

After the war, on 10 September 1948, Luitjens, who had been a member of the Nederlandse Landwacht that helped round up Jews and communists, was convicted and sentenced in absentia to life imprisonment as a collaborator and a war criminal. He evaded this punishment by fleeing to Paraguay, aided by Mennonites, using the name "Gerhard Harder". He immigrated to Canada in 1961, where he became an instructor in the Department of Botany at the University of British Columbia in Vancouver. Students in the department knew him as an almost completely silent "ghost-like" man.

The Frisian Jack Kooistra, also known as 'the Frisian Simon Wiesenthal', managed to track down Luitjens in 1992. Luitjens was stripped of his Canadian citizenship and was deported to the Netherlands, where he was imprisoned. He resumed his life sentence at a prison in Groningen until March 1995. Afterwards, the Canadian government forbade his return to Canada. Luitjens was without a nationality thereafter. Ian Kagedan of B'nai Brith Canada characterized the deportation as part of an ongoing "quest" to bring Nazi war criminals to justice.

Luitjens granted an interview in January 2022, at the age of 102. He died on 14 December 2022, at the age of 103. He was the last known living member of the NSB.
