= Nappanee, Indiana =

- City
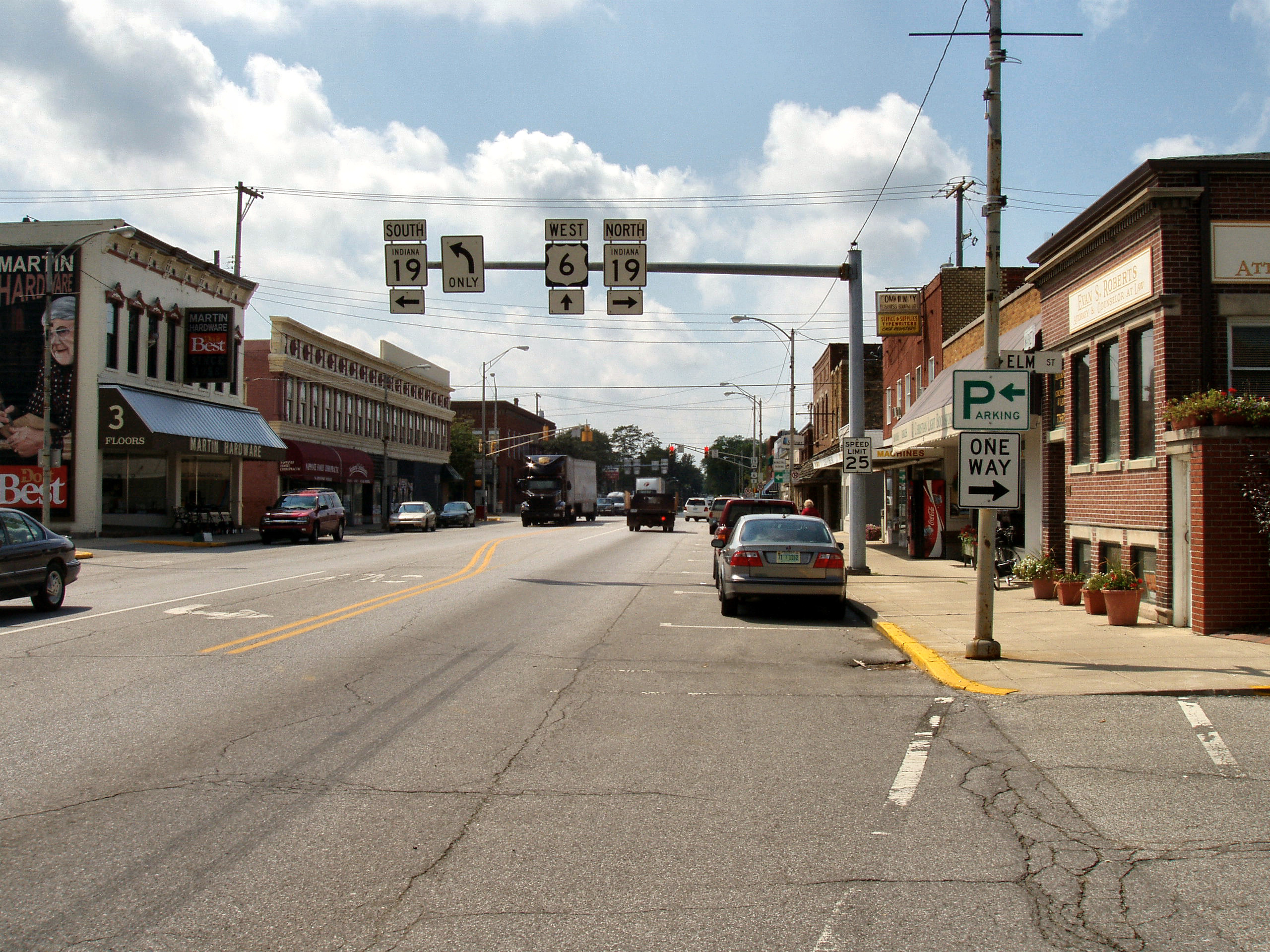
- Downtown Nappanee

- Logo

- Location of Nappanee in Elkhart County and Kosciusko County, Indiana.
- Coordinates: 41°26′48″N 85°59′58″W
- Country: United States
- State: Indiana
- Counties: Elkhart, Kosciusko

Government
  - Mayor: Phil Jenkins (R)

Area
  - Total: 4.78 sq mi (12.37 km^{2})
  - Land: 4.78 sq mi (12.37 km^{2})
  - Water: 0 sq mi (0.00 km^{2}) 0%
- Elevation: 863 ft (263 m)

Population (2020)
  - Total: 6,949
  - Density: 1,455.3/sq mi (561.91/km^{2})
- Time zone: UTC-5 (Eastern (EST))
  - Summer (DST): UTC-4 (EDT)
- ZIP code: 46550
- Area code: 574
- FIPS code: 18-52020
- GNIS feature ID: 2395150
- Website: www.nappanee.in.gov

Nappanee is a city in Elkhart and Kosciusko counties in the U.S. state of Indiana. The population was 6,648 as of the 2010 U.S. census and had grown to 6,913 by the 2020 U.S. census. The name Nappanee is thought to mean "flour" in the Algonquian language.

== History ==
Several hundred years ago, the indigenous Mound Builders built their settlements in an area to the north of the city's marshes. Pottawatomi arrived in the area from near Green Bay, Wisconsin in the 1700s, partially displacing the previous Miami inhabitants. The Pottawatomis had settlements on the Elkhart River at Elkhart, Goshen, and Waterford, and at Monoquet between Leesburg and Warsaw in what became Kosciusko County, Indiana. Thus, the Plymouth-Goshen Road near Nappanee probably follows the course of an old Indian Trail. The first European settlers came to the area in 1830, as various treaties and a process the Pottawatomi call the "Trail of Death" led to the relocation of Native Americans away from their traditional territories.

=== Railroad town ===
By 1870, seven farms had been established and forty people were settled around Nappanee. Locke Township had been founded in 1836 and named after Samuel Lockwood, and by 1863 a settlement called Wisler Town existed, but the actual platting of the village of Locke Town, approximately six miles from Nappanee, took place in December 1867. It would receive its last addition in 1874, the year that Nappanee was platted (on December 12, 1874).

The B&O Railroad sought a route westward from Sandusky, Ohio to the booming inland port of Chicago, Illinois in 1872. While the land around what became Nappanee and nearby Bremen was flat, permitting a straight crossing from Walkerton, it was also marshy, which led to various engineering challenges. The section through Nappanee was finally completed as a single track in the late summer of 1874 and replaced by steel rails in 1882. Farmers sold the railroad land so that its tracks would run right next to Nappanee on its route to Chicago, although the railroad was unable to acquire the five acres needed to build a side track to the existing town of Locke. Nonetheless, on December 6, 1874, about three weeks after the railroad reached the outskirts of Chicago, it commenced service to what it first called Locke's Station. By the month's end, Daniel Metzler, Henry Stahly, and John Culp Jr. had platted the town of Nappanee; Culp gave the railroad three acres for a station and Metzler two acres. By 1875, trains arrived almost daily at the new depot and discharged freight and passengers. The Eby brothers of Locke said they suggested the name because they came from Napanee, Ontario; one of the Metzlers said their father selected the name in part because of its native American connotations. Over time the B&O Railroad eventually became CSX.

=== Development ===
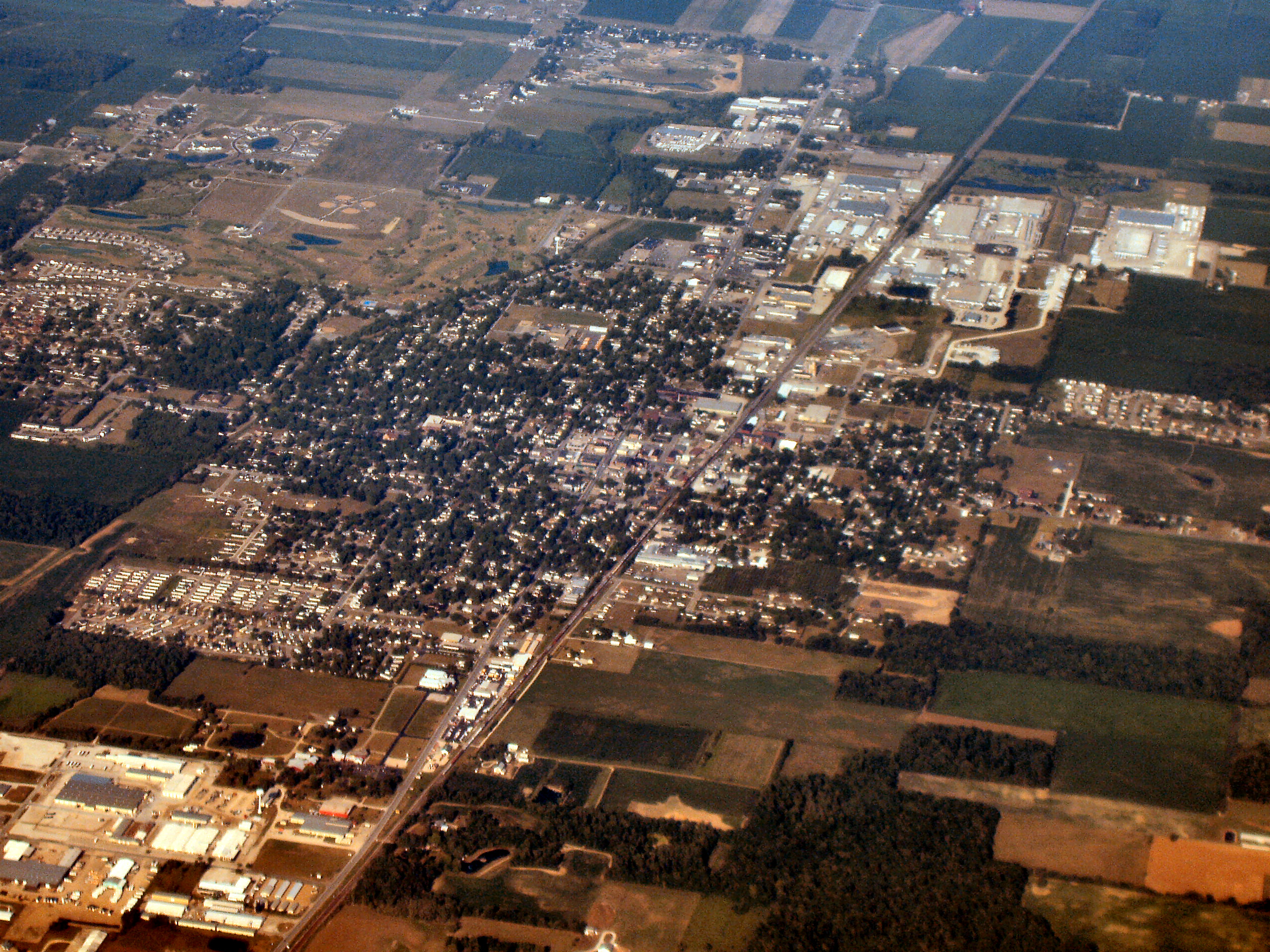
Nappanee from above

The town's first industry was a sawmill, and later additions were box-making, charcoal, and furniture businesses. The first brickyard (using local resources) was established before 1879. The first canning company was established in 1894, and a hemp factory was built by 1913. The hemp factory never reached full capacity, and was burned down in 1920, not rebuilt. Mobile home construction had started in Elkhart and Goshen by World War II, and the Walco and Franklin Coach Company were built in Nappanee after the war. Once the land was cleared, corn and wheat were planted, and agriculture has long been important in the area. By the early 20th century, onions had become a major crop (inspiring an autumn festival), and other farmer-entrepreneurs grew hemp, spearmint and peppermint.

Nappanee was governed as a township from 1874 until 1889 when it incorporated as a town (then electing a town marshal and establishing a fire company and soon a waterworks). The town library was started as a ladies' subscription service in 1895 and became a public library in 1925 after sufficient building funds were amassed to purchase an existing house, although a dedicated building wasn't opened until 1937. In 1895, some tried to establish a college in Nappanee, but unlike various fellowships and fraternal and literary societies, the proposal never was implemented. In 1925 Nappanee incorporated as a city. Early in the 20th century, various Nappanee natives became noted cartoonists, including Merrill Blosser, Max Gwin, Bill Holman, Fred Neher and Henry Maust, and political cartoonist Francis (Mike) Parks was educated in Nappanee before working for New York, Omaha and San Francisco newspapers. A marker outside the public library notes Nappanee's cartooning history. The Frank and Katharine Coppes House, Downtown Nappanee Historic District, Arthur Miller House, Nappanee Eastside Historic District, Nappanee West Park and Pavilion, and Stahly-Nissley-Kuhns Farm are listed on the National Register of Historic Places.

A tornado touched down in Nappanee around 10:30 PM on 18 October 2007, injuring at least five people and damaging 200 to 250 buildings, half of them severely. The tornado was classified as an EF3. The damage included three recreational vehicle factories that are among the community's largest employers: Fairmont Homes, Franklin Coach, and Gulf Stream Coach.

=== Amish migration to Nappanee ===
The Amish religious group that broke off from the Mennonites was formed in 1525 in Switzerland as part of the Radical Reformation and quickly spread to Germany and the Netherlands. As a more radical branch of the wider Protestant Reformation against Catholic practices, the Mennonites were vigorously persecuted by religious and worldly authorities. During the last decade of the 17th century a group from the Mennonites led by Jakob Ammann separated to form the Amish group which was named after its leader.

During the 18th century, the Amish were attracted to the promise of religious freedom in William Penn's colony and thus settled in Pennsylvania. Amish then migrated to Middlebury in 1841 coming from Holmes County, Ohio, where they had migrated to from Pennsylvania, starting in 1809. Nappanee's Amish originate from the early Amish immigrants from southwest Germany, notably the Palatinate, to Pennsylvania in the middle of the 18th century.

Amish families who became Old Order Amish in the second half of the 19th century first arrived in southwest Elkhart County in the early 1840s, and various other religious conservative denominations followed them. The First Mennonite Church in the area was founded in 1854, but members worshiped in homes, then built a schoolhouse in 1867 and also used it for services for several years (as did other denominations with their permission).

The first permanent building was erected in 1878, two years after the United Brethren Church moved from the schoolhouse into its own building (only to sell it and build a new building in 1888 and remodel it in 1928). Nappanee is still surrounded by family farms of conservative Anabaptists, including the Amish, Mennonites, and the Schwarzenau Brethren.

== Geography ==
According to the 2010 census, the city has a total area of 4.15 square miles (10.7 km^{2}) of land.

Nappanee is now surrounded by fertile farmland as the headwaters of the Wabash River in northern Indiana, but initially was one of the least desirable areas of what became Elkhart County, due to dense woods and widespread swamps, particularly tamarack marshes. The water drains into two watersheds—precipitation south of what became Market Street drains into the Wabash River, thence to the Ohio River, Mississippi River, and ultimately the Gulf of Mexico. Precipitation north of Market Street drains into the Great Lakes, and ultimately the St. Lawrence River and the Atlantic Ocean.

== Demographics ==
Historical population
Census	Pop.	Note	%±
1880	547		—
1890	1,493		172.9%
1900	2,208		47.9%
1910	2,260		2.4%
1920	2,678		18.5%
1930	2,957		10.4%
1940	3,028		2.4%
1950	3,393		12.1%
1960	3,895		14.8%
1970	4,159		6.8%
1980	4,694		12.9%
1990	5,510		17.4%
2000	6,710		21.8%
2010	6,648		−0.9%
2020	6,949		4.5%
U.S. Decennial Census

=== 2020 census ===
As of the 2020 census, Nappanee had a population of 6,949. The median age was 34.4 years. 27.3% of residents were under the age of 18 and 15.0% of residents were 65 years of age or older. For every 100 females there were 98.8 males, and for every 100 females age 18 and over there were 96.7 males age 18 and over.

99.8% of residents lived in urban areas, while 0.2% lived in rural areas.

There were 2,728 households in Nappanee, of which 35.6% had children under the age of 18 living in them. Of all households, 49.1% were married-couple households, 18.5% were households with a male householder and no spouse or partner present, and 24.2% were households with a female householder and no spouse or partner present. About 26.5% of all households were made up of individuals and 11.4% had someone living alone who was 65 years of age or older.

There were 2,949 housing units, of which 7.5% were vacant. The homeowner vacancy rate was 1.6% and the rental vacancy rate was 10.9%.

Racial composition as of the 2020 census
Race	Number	Percent
White	6,199	89.2%
Black or African American	51	0.7%
American Indian and Alaska Native	25	0.4%
Asian	22	0.3%
Native Hawaiian and Other Pacific Islander	0	0.0%
Some other race	267	3.8%
Two or more races	385	5.5%
Hispanic or Latino (of any race)	570	8.2%

=== 2010 census ===
As of the census of 2010, there were 6,648 people, 2,545 households, and 1,792 families residing in the city. The population density was 1,601.9 inhabitants per square mile (618.5/km^{2}). There were 2,852 housing units at an average density of 687.2 per square mile (265.3/km^{2}). The racial makeup of the city was 94.8% White, 0.7% African American, 0.3% Native American, 0.2% Asian, 0.1% Pacific Islander, 2.4% from other races, and 1.5% from two or more races. Hispanic or Latino of any race were 6.2% of the population.

There were 2,545 households, of which 37.8% had children under the age of 18 living with them, 52.7% were married couples living together, 12.0% had a female householder with no husband present, 5.7% had a male householder with no wife present, and 29.6% were non-families. 24.6% of all households were made up of individuals, and 9.9% had someone living alone who was 65 years of age or older. The average household size was 2.60 and the average family size was 3.09.

The median age in the city was 34.8 years. 27.9% of residents were under the age of 18; 8.6% were between the ages of 18 and 24; 27.6% were from 25 to 44; 23.4% were from 45 to 64; and 12.5% were 65 years of age or older. The gender makeup of the city was 48.9% male and 51.1% female.

=== 2000 census ===
As of the census of 2000, there were 6,710 people, 2,521 households, and 1,792 families residing in the city. The population density was 1,818.9 inhabitants per square mile (702.3/km^{2}). There were 2,647 housing units at an average density of 717.5 per square mile (277.0/km^{2}). The racial makeup of the city was 95.48% White, 0.28% African American, 0.22% Native American, 0.34% Asian, 2.52% from other races, and 1.15% from two or more races. Hispanic or Latino of any race were 4.98% of the population.

There were 2,521 households, out of which 39.2% had children under the age of 18 living with them, 57.1% were married couples living together, 9.3% had a female householder with no husband present, and 28.9% were non-families. 23.9% of all households were made up of individuals, and 8.6% had someone living alone who was 65 years of age or older. The average household size was 2.65 and the average family size was 3.15.

In the city the population was spread out, with 29.7% under the age of 18, 10.6% from 18 to 24, 30.9% from 25 to 44, 17.9% from 45 to 64, and 11.0% who were 65 years of age or older. The median age was 31 years. For every 100 females, there were 99.8 males. For every 100 females age 18 and over, there were 97.5 males.

The median income for a household in the city was $45,988, and the median income for a family was $53,329. Males had a median income of $36,200 versus $21,733 for females. The per capita income for the city was $19,229. About 4.5% of families and 4.6% of the population were below the poverty line, including 5.9% of those under age 18 and 8.4% of those age 65 or over.

=== Amish community ===
There is a large Amish community founded in 1842, centered around Nappanee. It is the sixth largest of all Amish settlements with 5,910 people (in 43 congregations) in 2017.

== Economy ==
Nappanee is a regional center for both the recreational vehicle manufacturing industry and the Amish craft and tourism industry. Many Amish and Mennonite families live in the area, employed in the farming industry as well as working in the recreational vehicle industry or woodworking trade. Following a devastating tornado in 2007, Nappanee suffered a sluggish economy and slow recovery, resulting in significant job losses for the city. It has since recovered. Since 2014, the town has been home to a major bus assembly plant owned by British maker Alexander Dennis.

== Arts and culture ==
=== National Register of Historic Places ===
- Arthur Miller House
- Frank and Katharine Coppes House
- Downtown Nappanee Historic District
- Nappanee Eastside Historic District
- Nappanee West Park and Pavilion
- Richard and Susan Pletcher House
- Stahly–Nissley–Kuhns Farm

=== Attractions ===
Amish Acres is a historic Amish farm and heritage resort.

=== Festivals ===
The Nappanee Apple Festival features vendors, road races, contests, and a tractor pull. The festival attracted over 76,000 people in 2011 and is one of the largest festivals in Indiana.

Amish Acres Arts & Crafts Festival is an annual festival.

=== Library ===
The Nappanee Public Library serves as a free lending library.

== Parks and recreation ==
There are nine parks in the City of Nappanee. They are:

- Borkholder Nature Center & Wetlands
- Callander Sportsplex
- McCormick Creek Golf Course
- Nappanee Dog Park
- Recovery Park
- South Park
- Stauffer Park
- Wellfield Park
- West Park

== Education ==
Public education is administered by Wa-Nee Community Schools. Schools located in Nappanee include:

- Nappanee Elementary School
- NorthWood High School
- Woodview Elementary School

== Transportation ==
Until train service ceased on March 7, 2005, Nappanee station was a stop on Amtrak's Three Rivers train with service to Chicago and New York.

== Notable people ==
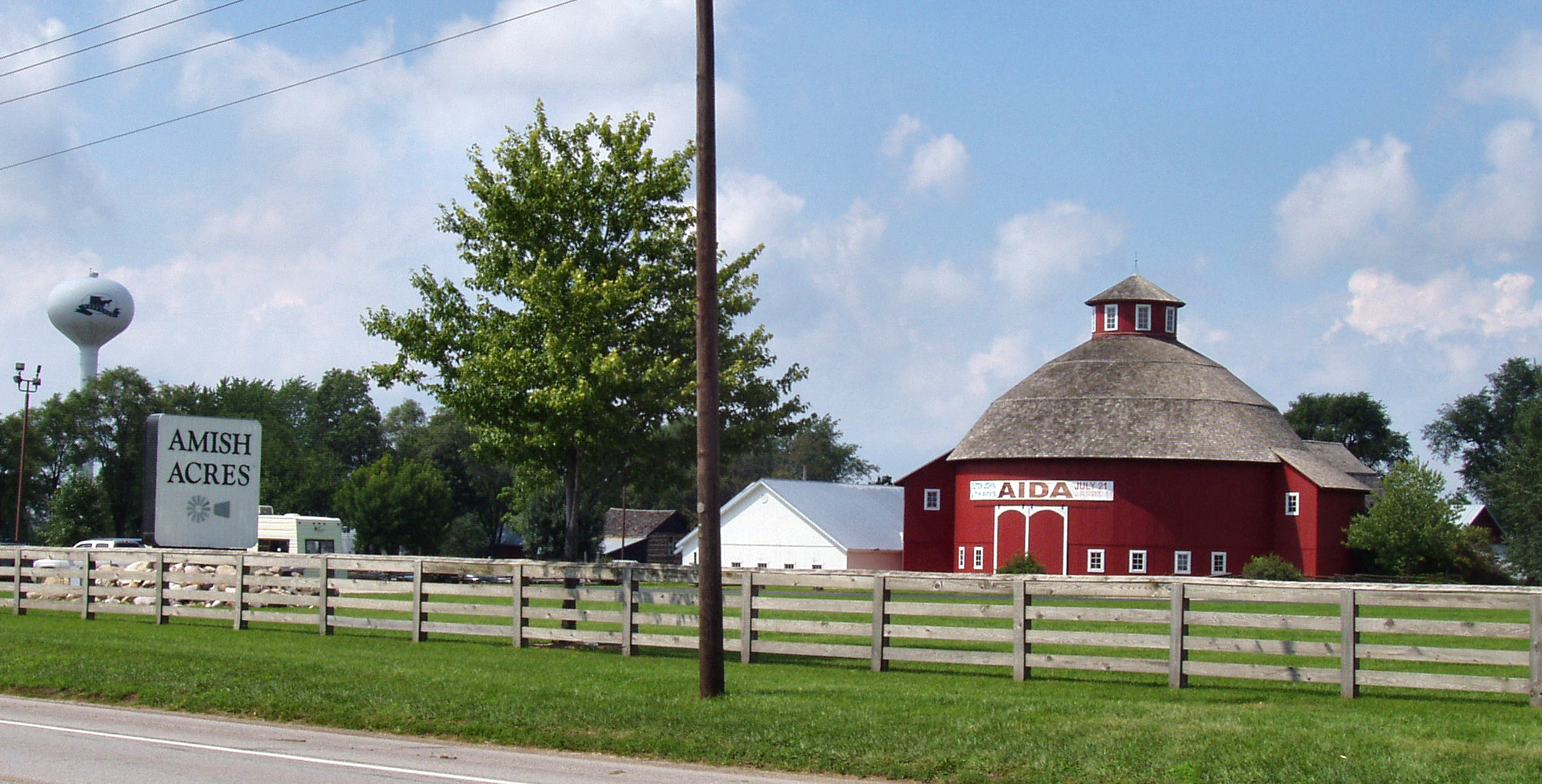
Amish Acres, a popular tourist attraction in Nappanee.

- Merrill Blosser, (Freckles and His Friends)
- David Crane, creator of Pitfall! and co-founder of Activision
- Vance George, conductor of the San Francisco Symphony Chorus from 1982 to 2006
- Bill Holman, (Smokey Stover)
- Fred Neher, (Life’s Like That)
- Bob Rensberger, (1921–2007), a professional basketball player for the Chicago Stags
- Diane Meyer Simon, environmental activist and former wife of Herbert Simon
