= WDND =

WDND may refer to:

- WDND (1620 AM), a defunct radio station in South Bend, Indiana, which held the call sign WDND from 2001 to 2004 and from 2009 to 2019
- WDND (1490 AM), a defunct radio station in South Bend, Indiana, which held the call sign WDND from 2006 to 2009
- WHLY (1580 AM), a radio station in South Bend, Indiana, which held the call sign WDND from 2004 to 2006
- WYKT (105.5 FM), a radio station in Wilmington, Illinois, which held the call sign WDND from 1982 to 1995
