= WNDU =

WNDU may refer to:

- WNDU-TV, a television station (channel 16 virtual/27 digital) licensed to South Bend, Indiana, United States
- WNDV-FM, a radio station (92.9 FM) licensed to South Bend, Indiana, United States, which used the call sign WNDU-FM until November 1998
- WDND (1490 AM), a radio station licensed to South Bend, Indiana, United States, which used the call sign WNDU from 1955 until November 1998
