= Goshen Historic District (Goshen, Indiana) =

Historic district in Indiana, United States

- U.S. National Register of Historic Places
- U.S. Historic district
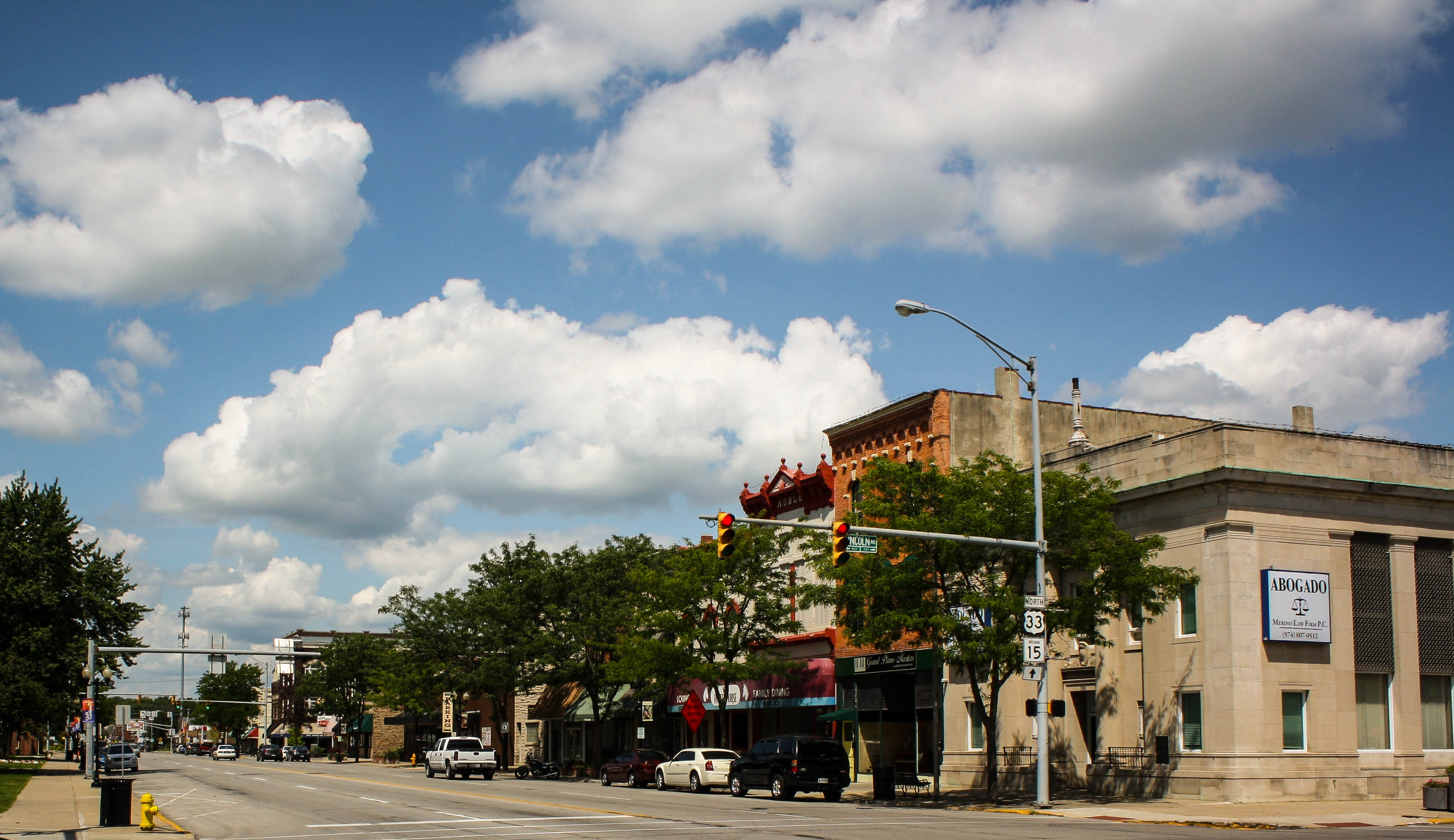
- Goshen Historic District, August 2015

- Location within Indiana Location within the United States
- Location: Bounded by Pike, RR, Cottage, Plymouth, Main, Purl, the Canal, and Second Sts., Goshen, Indiana
- Coordinates: 41°34′57″N 85°49′57″W
- Area: 215 acres (87 ha)
- Built: 1860
- Architect: Multiple
- Architectural style: Italianate, Queen Anne
- NRHP reference No.: 83000029
- Added to NRHP: February 17, 1983

Goshen Historic District is a national historic district located at Goshen, Indiana. The district encompasses 751 contributing buildings and one contributing site in the central business district and surrounding residential sections of Goshen. The town was developed between about 1840 and 1930, and includes notable examples of Italianate and Queen Anne style architecture. Located with in the district are the separately listed Elkhart County Courthouse and Goshen Carnegie Public Library. Other notable buildings include the Kindy Block (1881), Central Block (1882), Spohn Building (1909), Harper Block (1888), Noble Building (c. 1885), Jefferson Theater (1907), General Baptist Church (1859), First Methodist Church (1874), and St. James Episcopal Church (1862).

It was added to the National Register of Historic Places in 1983.

== Significant structures ==
The Historic District includes areas of commercial, residential, and industrial development. The area is primarily a rectangular grid of streets. It is bordered on the north, east, and south by major roads. A 19th century canal forms the western boundary. South of Monroe Street, Main Street changes direction towards the southeast to roughly parallel with the canal.

=== Elkhart County Courthouse ===
Goshen was chosen as the seat of county government owing to its central location. A square block near the center of town was reserved for a county courthouse. Completed in 1870, this is the second building on the site. It replaces an 1830s structure that was too small. The present courthouse was designed by the Chicago architectural firm of Barrows and Garnsey, and features a large clock tower. In 1905 it was remodeled by Patton and Miller, also of Chicago. The changes included adding 20,000 square feet of office space and the removing of an asymmetrically placed tower replaced with a central tower. The building was listed on the National Register of Historic Places in April, 1980.

On the corner of Lincoln and Main is a unique hold over from the depression era. There stands aa octagonal, bullet proof, pill box style, gun emplacement. Now used for minor administrative duties, the stone structure features bullet proof glass, pistol port holes and a revolving machine gun cupola on top. Built to discourage highwaymen such as John Dillinger, it stands on the corner of Goshen's two main highways.

=== Noble Building ===
Constructed around 1885 with a sandstone main façade with cast iron and sheet metal detailing. The second floor features four large, double-hung windows with decorated lintels. The half-story top-floor, has smaller fixed windows with stained glass. The building features a sheet metal cornice, which includes ornate brackets on a decorated frieze. From the center of the cornice rises a pediment with a sunburst design, below which appears the name "Noble".

=== Spohn Building ===
A three-story brick structure was built in 1909 and housed a veterinary supplies manufacturer. Samuel F. Spohn, the owner, was a one-term mayor of Goshen. The building is separated into three bays by three-story brick pilasters with limestone detailing. The main entry is in the center bay. The main entry and the third-floor windows feature segmental arch tops with decorative stone hoods.

=== Bank Building ===
This Renaissance-inspired structure, built in 1875, has a well-detailed main façade of cast-iron. The first floor is elevated, with iron stairs providing access from the sidewalk up to the main floor and down to the basement, a feature common in the large cities of the East but very unusual in Indiana. Fluted columns flank the east entryway. On the second floor level, a row of seven arched windows of varying sizes stretches across the entire façade, with elaborate hoodmolds springing from fluted pilasters. The ornate cornice features brackets and dentils, and a parapet over the center of the building gives its name and construction date. The west side of the ground floor has been remodeled but the east half remains intact.

=== Harper Block ===
A redbrick, two-story commercial building was built in 1888 to house the Harper Boot and Shoe business. The ground floor has changed. The second floor and cornice retain their original detailing. The second floor windows feature heavy hood molds connected by a string course. Above the cornice is the legend: "Harper Block, 1888".

=== Commercial Building ===
This 1885 building is one of the finest Queen Anne style facades in the district. The second floor façade is made of sheet metal with egg-and-dart molding, pilasters, several rows of dentils, garlands, and modillions. Some of the second-for windows have leaded glass.

=== Kindy Block ===
This building has been the location of Newell's ladies' wear store since 1881. The structure is located on the southwest corner of Main and Washington and features a large, overhanging cornice with brackets and modillions on the Main Street façade. The Washington Street cornice is less ornate, consisting of decorative brick corbelling. Ornate window hoods appear on the second floor level throughout the building. The ground floor has been obscured by the addition of large display windows, but this was accomplished without destroying the main wall fabric and could be reversed.

=== Central Block ===
Built in 1882 the building is located at Main and Washington, and features a corner entry. The second floor features the original double-hung windows with stone sills and lintels. The cornice features elaborate brackets and dentils. The legend, "1882 Central Block", appears in the parapet over the doorway.

=== Jefferson Theater ===
Built in 1907, it replaced an earlier structure, which was destroyed by fire on December 18, 1906. Originally for live stage shows, the Jefferson began showing movies in 1912. Colonel J. M. Wood designed it to and seats over 1,100 people. It is built of buff colored brick with Bedford limestone details. The third floor features rounded arch windows having radiating stone voussoirs, with stone striations, and a simple cornice with dentils.

=== Rowell Residence ===
Goshen's oldest brick home, built in 1847 by George P. Rowell. It is a Greek Revival design, the house features a monumental portico, with two-story Doric columns supporting a massive pediment. The classic frieze features guttae under the triglyphs and unadorned metopes.

=== General Baptist Church ===
This Baptist Church is popularly believed to be the oldest frame structure in the city, dating from 1859. It originally stood at the corner of Washington and 6th Streets. In 1876 it was sold to the city's Jewish congregation, which two years later had the building moved to its present site. After the Jewish congregation disbanded in 1932, the building passed through a number of hands until it was acquired by the General Baptist congregation, its present owner. The building offers a curious combination of elements from the Greek revival, Italianate, and Queen Anne styles.

=== C. W. Kerstetter Residence ===
This brick home was built in 1868 in the Italianate style and features a mansard roof with cornice brackets. The curving front porch was added in 1904. It was remodeled in 1974 to restored the interior to its original appearance.

=== William Gardner Home ===
Built in 1855 by William Gardner as a one-story Italianate home. A major remodeling in the 1890s added a second floor and the Queen Anne-style detailing.

=== J. M. Dale Home ===
The Queen Anne house was built in 1890 by J. M. Dale, a wealthy dry goods merchant. The house has an irregular floor plan, a slate roof with an abundance of dormers, and a large, octagonal tower in the south corner of the main (west) façade. The porch and balcony feature decorative wood trim. The house is believed to be the first in Goshen to be wired for electricity.

=== Goshen Public Library ===
The first public library in Goshen was built in 1902. It was the first Andrew Carnegie library built in Indiana. A small, Neo-Classical structure of Bedford limestone. A central rotunda has imitation onyx and marble trim and an art-glass dome. This building has been renovated and serves as the architectural offices of Troyer and Associates.

=== First Methodist Church ===
The Victorian Gothic church was built in 1874. It has a square tower with a spire in the southwest corner. Over the entry is a three-pointed arch with stained glass windows. This building was designed by Cass Chapman.
