= WPNT (disambiguation) =

WPNT is currently The CW affiliate in Pittsburgh, Pennsylvania, owned by Sinclair Broadcast Group.

WPNT may also mean:

- WDND (1490 AM), a former radio station licensed to serve South Bend, Indiana, USA, which held the call sign WPNT from 2009 until its license was canceled in 2011
- WDND (1620 AM), a former radio station licensed to serve South Bend, Indiana, which held the call sign WPNT from 2008 until 2009
- WBGI (AM), a radio station (1340 AM) licensed to serve Connellsville, Pennsylvania, which held the call sign WPNT from 2001 to 2005
- WFGI (AM), a radio station (940 AM) licensed to serve Charleroi, Pennsylvania, which held the call sign WPNT from 2000 to 2001
- WLZX-FM, a radio station (1600 AM) licensed to serve East Longmeadow, Massachusetts, which held the call sign WPNT from 1999 to 2000
- WRXS, a radio station (106.9 FM) licensed to serve Milwaukee, Wisconsin, which held the call sign WPNT from 1997 to 1999
- WTBC-FM, a radio station (100.3 FM) licensed to serve Chicago, Illinois, which held the call sign WPNT-FM from 1990 to 1997
- WCPT (AM), a radio station (820 AM) licensed to serve Chicago, Illinois, which held the call sign WPNT from 1990 to 1992
- WLTJ, a radio station (92.9 FM) licensed to serve Pittsburgh, Pennsylvania, which held the call sign WPNT from 1979 to 1986
