= WDND (1620 AM) =

- South Bend, Indiana; United States
- Broadcast area: South Bend metropolitan area
- Frequency: 1620 kHz

Ownership
- Owner: Artistic Media Partners, Inc.
- Sister stations: WNDV-FM; WYET; WYXX

History
- First air date: November 6, 1998
- Last air date: March 2, 2018
- Former call signs: WJVA (1998–1999); WHLY (1999–2001); WDND (2001–2004); WHLY (2004–2006); WWLV (2006–2008); WPNT (2008–2009)
- Call sign meaning: "Notre Dame" (disambiguation of former WNDU calls on 1490)

Technical information
- Facility ID: 87112
- Class: B
- Power: 10,000 watts day; 1,000 watts night
- Transmitter coordinates: 41°38′10.2″N 86°17′9″W

WDND (1620 kHz) was an AM radio station serving South Bend, Indiana. The station was owned by Artistic Media Partners, Inc. Its license was cancelled on April 15, 2019.

WDND's transmitter was located off Locust Road, near Lincoln Highway (U.S. Route 20 - U.S. Route 31) in South Bend. The studios and offices were on South Michigan Street, also in South Bend.

== History ==
WDND originated as the expanded band "twin" of an existing station on the standard AM band. On March 17, 1997, the Federal Communications Commission (FCC) announced that 88 stations had been given permission to move to newly available "Expanded Band" transmitting frequencies, ranging from 1610 to 1700 kHz, with WHLY in South Bend authorized to move from 1580 to 1620 kHz. The construction permit for the expanded band station, licensed to Artistic Media Partners and also located in South Bend, was assigned the call letters WJVA on March 6, 1998.

WJVA signed on the air on November 6, 1998. It simulcast Westwood One's adult standards format with WHLY 1580 AM (Radio Hollywood). In February 1999 these two stations swapped call signs, with the WHLY call letters and music format transferring to 1620 kHz, while the WJVA call letters went to 1580 AM, with a classic country format. AM 1580 WJVA resumed simulcasting the adult standards programming of WHLY in spring 2001.

On November 3, 2001, AM 1620 adopted an all-sports format, as an affiliate ESPN Radio, with the new call sign WDND. The WHLY call letters were returned to AM 1580, which continued to air the adult standards format. In March 2004, the sports format and call letters moved to AM 1580 while the WHLY call sign and adult standards format returned to 1620.

In March 2006, the call letters were changed to WWLV and the station adopted a soft AC format branded as "Love Songs 1620". In May 2008, the station became known as WPNT ("The Point") and began to broadcast an all-news format from CNN Headline News.

In late April 2009, Artistic's station at 1490 AM, then known as WDND, left the air as its transmitting tower on the campus of Notre Dame University was dismantled to make room for a new hockey arena, and Artistic moved its sports programming from 1490 to 1620, with the two stations swapping call signs on May 13, 2009, as the call letters WDND were moved to 1620 AM, and WPNT moved to 1490 AM. On September 23, 2011, WDND changed its format from ESPN sports to a simulcast of co-owned Top 40 station WNDV at 92.9 FM, then known as "U93".

The FCC generally enforced a policy that both an original standard AM band station, and its expanded band counterpart, had to remain under common ownership. Therefore, in 2013 the FCC denied a request to separately transfer WDND to the St. Thomas More Foundation. In March 2016, WDND stopped simulcasting U93, and returned to adult standards, using the "America's Best Music" syndicated format from Westwood One.

The FCC's initial policy was that both the original station and its expanded band counterpart could operate simultaneously for up to five years, after which owners would have to turn in one of the two licenses, depending on whether they preferred the new assignment or elected to keep the original frequency, although this deadline was extended multiple times. WDND suspended operations on March 2, 2018, and it was ultimately decided to remain on the original frequency of 1580 kHz, with the license for WDND on 1620 kHz cancelled on April 15, 2019.
