= WUBU =

WUBU may refer to:

- WUBU (FM), a radio station (102.3 FM) licensed to serve New Carlisle, Indiana, United States
- WVSB (FM), a radio station (106.3 FM) licensed to serve South Bend, Indiana, which held the call sign WUBU from 1992 to 2023
