= WKAM =

Simulcast with WHLY (1580 AM)
- Goshen, Indiana; United States
- Frequency: 1460 kHz
- Branding: La Raza

Programming
- Format: Regional Mexican

Ownership
- Owner: I.B. Communications, LTD
- Sister stations: WHLY

History
- First air date: July 11, 1949
- Former frequencies: 1220 kHz (1949–1954)

Technical information
- Licensing authority: FCC
- Facility ID: 49559
- Class: B
- Power: 2,500 watts day; 500 watts night
- Repeater: 98.1 W251AR (Goshen)

Links
- Public license information: Public file; LMS
- Website: www.larazaindiana.com

WKAM 1460 AM is a radio station broadcasting a Regional Mexican music format. Licensed to Goshen, Indiana, the station is owned by I.B. Communications, LTD. The station also broadcasts on translator 98.1 W251AR licensed to Goshen, Indiana.

== History ==
WKAM was established in Warsaw, Indiana, with the awarding of a construction permit to Kosciusko Broadcasting Corporation for a 250-watt, daytime-only radio station on December 22, 1948. The station went on the air July 11, 1949, and remained in Warsaw until 1954, when it was approved to move to Goshen, change frequency to 1460 kHz, and increase power to 500 watts. The move to Goshen was in part because the city had no radio stations despite having a larger population than Warsaw, which was also served by WRSW.

== Translator ==
| Call sign | Frequency | City of license | FID | ERP (W) | HAAT | Class | Transmitter coordinates | FCC info |
|---|---|---|---|---|---|---|---|---|
| W251AR | 98.1 FM | Goshen, Indiana | 157025 | 13 | 101.8 m (334 ft) | D | 41°36′4.2″N 85°55′41″W | LMS |
