= WHLY =

Coordinates: 41°41′9.17″N 86°9′53.02″W

- South Bend, Indiana; United States
- Frequency: 1580 kHz
- Branding: La Raza

Programming
- Format: Regional Mexican

Ownership
- Owner: Ignacio Zepeda; (I.B. Communications, Ltd.)
- Sister stations: WKAM

History
- First air date: 1947
- Former call signs: WJVA (1947–1981); WAMJ (1981–1993); WIWO (1993–1994); WHLY (1994–1999); WJVA (1999–2001); WHLY (2001–2004); WDND (2004–2006)
- Call sign meaning: from former "Radio Hollywood" branding

Technical information
- Licensing authority: FCC
- Facility ID: 67133
- Class: B
- Power: 1,000 watts day; 500 watts night

Links
- Public license information: Public file; LMS
- Webcast: Listen live
- Website: www.larazaindiana.com

WHLY is a regional Mexican radio station in South Bend, Indiana, broadcasting at 1580 on the AM dial. The station is owned by Ignacio Zepeda's I.B. Communications, Ltd., who also owns WKAM 1460 AM in Goshen; the two stations simulcast as "La Raza".

== History ==
The station began broadcasting on December 22, 1947, as WJVA, a 250-watt daytime-only station on 1580 kHz. Studio and transmitter were on Hickory Road in Mishawaka, Indiana. It has used several different call signs since the early 1980s, including WAMJ and WIWO. The WHLY calls were first used at AM 1580 in 1994 as "Radio Hollywood", using Westwood One's Adult Standards nostalgia-based music format.

On March 17, 1997, the Federal Communications Commission (FCC) announced that 88 stations had been given permission to move to newly available "Expanded Band" transmitting frequencies, ranging from 1610 to 1700 kHz, with WHLY authorized to move from 1580 to 1620 kHz. A construction permit for the expanded band station, licensed to Artistic Media Partners and also located in South Bend, was assigned the call letters WJVA on March 6, 1998, and began broadcasting in November 1998.

A simulcast of AM 1580 at first, AM 1620 picked up the "Radio Hollywood" standards format and WHLY calls on a permanent basis after a few months, while the WJVA calls returned to AM 1580, which flipped to classic country, in February 1999.

The station was owned by Times Communications, but from 1999 to 2006 was operated by Artistic Media Partners under an LMA. The country format ended in March 2001 and 1580 and 1620 once again began to simulcast, setting in motion a complicated series of call letter and format changes that would continue over the next five years:

- AM 1580 regained the WHLY calls in November 2001 (continuing with the standards format) while AM 1620 became WDND, broadcasting ESPN Radio.
- The WDND calls and ESPN Radio format moved to 1580 in March 2004 as the WHLY calls and standards format moved back to 1620, which eventually switched from Westwood One's Adult Standards to ABC Radio's Timeless Classics.
- Then in 2006, AM 1620 flipped from standards to soft AC "Love Songs 1620" as WWLV; the WHLY calls once again moved to 1580 AM, while the WDND calls and ESPN Radio moved to 1490 AM (the former WNDV). WHLY went silent for a short time and then returned to the air with a mix of adult standards, oldies, and classic country.

Times Communications' LMA with Artistic Media Partners expired, and from December 8, 2006, until May 1, 2013, Times leased WHLY to St. Thomas More Foundation, which debuted a Catholic format featuring EWTN programming. The FCC generally enforced a policy that both an original standard AM band station, and its expanded band twin, had to remain under common ownership. Therefore, in 2013 the FCC denied a request to separately transfer the expanded band station, now WDND, to the St. Thomas More Foundation. On May 1, 2013, WHLY adopted its current regional Mexican format as "La Raza 1580 AM".

The FCC's initial policy for expanded band authorizations was that both the original station and its expanded band counterpart could operate simultaneously for up to five years, after which owners would have to turn in one of the two licenses, depending on whether they preferred the new assignment or elected to keep the original frequency, although this deadline was extended multiple times. It was ultimately decided to remain on the original frequency, and the license for WDND on 1620 kHz was cancelled on April 15, 2019, with WHLY remaining on the air at 1580 kHz.
