= Wubu =

Wubu may refer to:

- Wubu County, in Yulin, Shaanxi, China
- WVSB (FM), a radio station (106.3 FM) licensed to serve South Bend, Indiana, United States, which held the call sign WUBU from 1992 to 2023
- Wūbù (巫步), "shaman's steps," a form of Taoist dance. See yubu.
- Zhao Erxun, Chinese political and military officeholder with the art name Wubu
