= WSMM =

WSMM may refer to:

- WSMM (AM), a radio station (850 AM) licensed to serve Maryville, Tennessee, United States
- WUBU (FM), a radio station (102.3 FM) licensed to serve New Carlisle, Indiana, United States, which held the call sign WSMM from 2008 to 2016
- WYSS, a radio station (99.5 FM) licensed to serve Sault Ste. Marie, Michigan, United States, which held the call sign WSMM from 1972 to 1981
