= WZOW-FM =

- Goshen, Indiana; United States
- Broadcast area: South Bend, Indiana
- Frequency: 97.7 MHz
- Branding: 97.7 ZOW

Programming
- Format: Classic rock
- Affiliations: Westwood One

Ownership
- Owner: Artistic Media Partners; (Sound Management, LLC)
- Sister stations: WNDV-FM; WUBU

History
- First air date: January 17, 1977
- Former call signs: WZOW (1977–2006); WOZW (2006–2008); WZOW (2008–2011); WSSM (2011–2013); WZOW (2013–2014); WSSM (2014–2016); WYXX (2016–2025)

Technical information
- Licensing authority: FCC
- Facility ID: 49558
- Class: A
- ERP: 2,900 watts
- HAAT: 147 meters (482 ft)
- Transmitter coordinates: 41°36′13.4″N 85°55′45.9″W

Links
- Public license information: Public file; LMS
- Webcast: Listen live
- Website: 977zow.com

WZOW-FM (97.7 FM, "97.7 ZOW") is a radio station broadcasting a classic rock music format. Licensed to Goshen, Indiana, the station serves the South Bend area. The station is owned by Sound Management, LLC.

== History ==
On April 7, 2008, WZOW changed its call sign to WSSM and changed its format from classic rock to oldies, branded as "The Stream". Programming on WSMM and WSSM (102.3 FM) came from Westwood One Local's Classic Hits/Pop format.

WSMM/WSSM also played continuous Christmas music during the Christmas season. The station changed its call sign back to WZOW on December 19, 2013, and changed its callsign back to WSSM on June 11, 2014.

On October 10, 2016, the station switched to a classic rock format, branded as "Rock 97.7", and changed its call sign to WYXX. It also picked up The Bob & Tom Show which had been dropped a week before by WQLQ when it switched to a top 40/CHR format.

On April 7, 2025, WYXX rebranded as "97.7 ZOW" and returned to the WZOW call sign.
