= Violett-Martin House and Gardens =

Historic house in Indiana, United States

- U.S. National Register of Historic Places
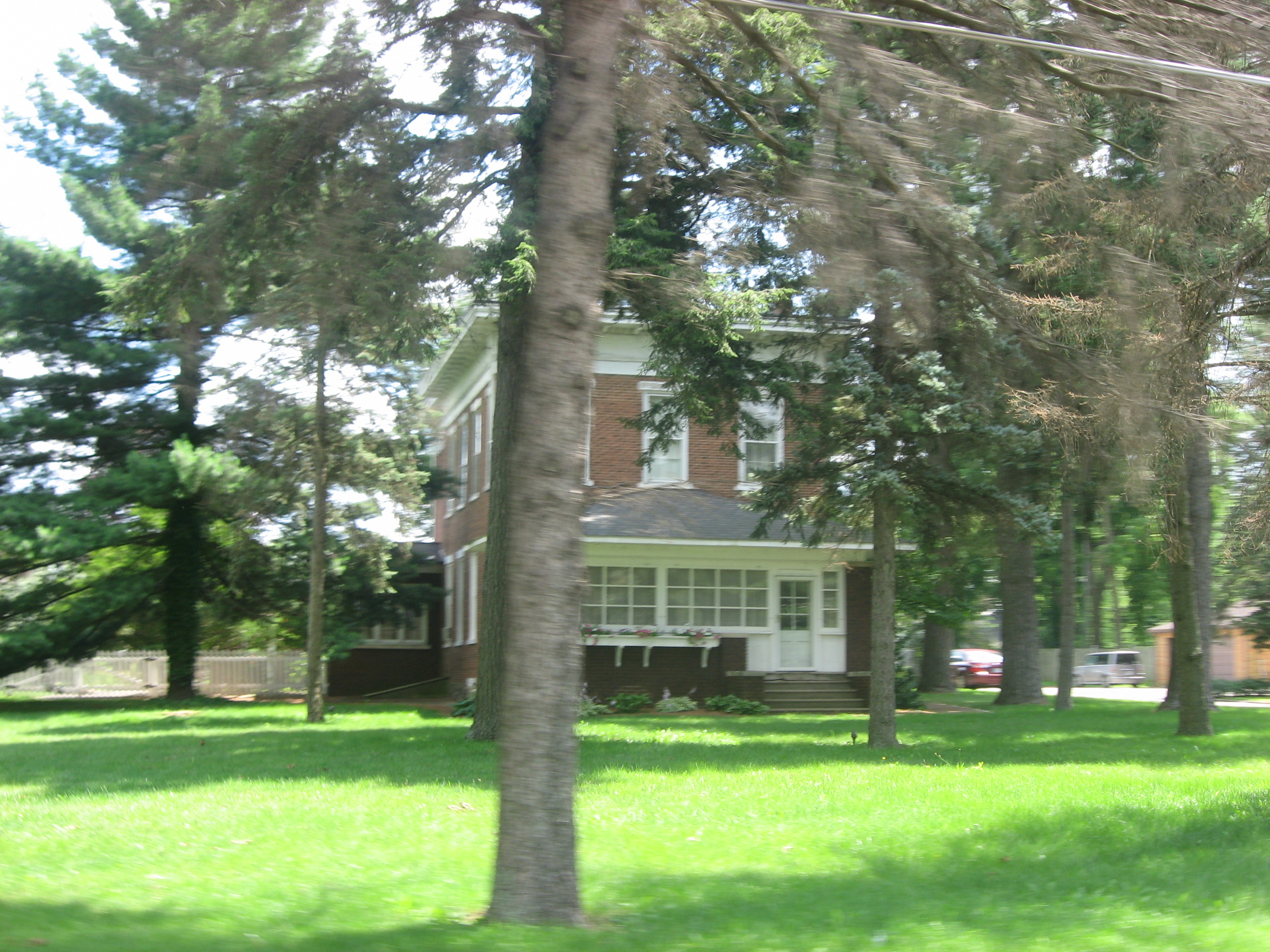
- Violett-Martin House, July 2013

- Location within Indiana Location within the United States
- Location: 2612 S. Main, Goshen, Indiana
- Coordinates: 41°33′4″N 85°49′40″W
- Area: 2.8 acres (1.1 ha)
- Built: c. 1855-1858
- Built by: Martin, Earnest
- Architectural style: Italianate
- NRHP reference No.: 07000978
- Added to NRHP: September 20, 2007

Violett-Martin House and Gardens is a historic home and garden located in Goshen, Indiana. The house was built between 1855 and 1858, and is a two-story, Italianate style red brick dwelling with a hipped roof. It was enlarged in the 1920s. Also on the property are the contributing garage, workhouse, greenhouse built circa 1920 and landscaped grounds with pergola.

It was added to the National Register of Historic Places in 2007.
