= William N. Violett House =

Historic house in Indiana, United States

- U.S. National Register of Historic Places
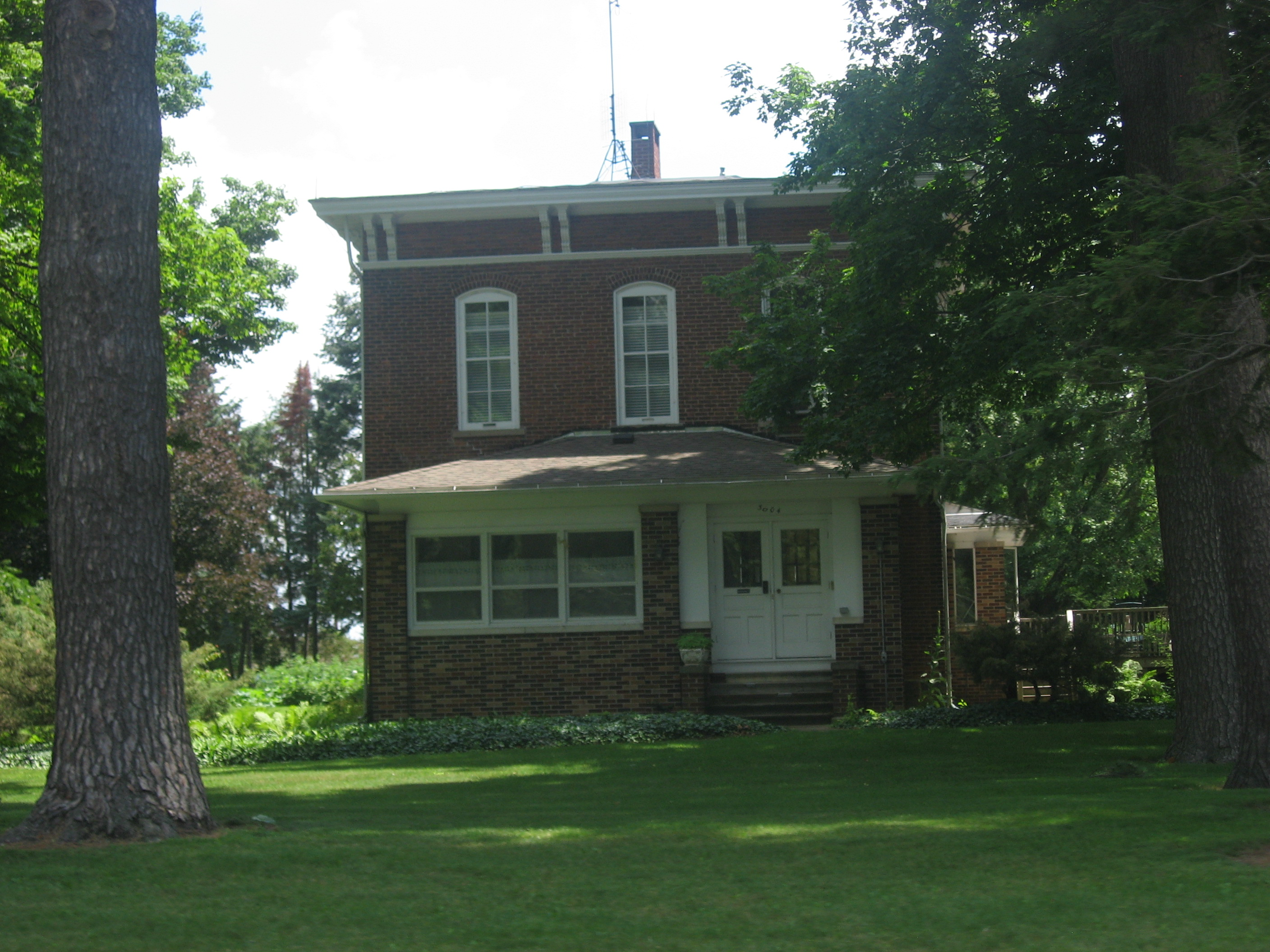
- William N. Violett House, July 2013

- Location within Indiana Location within the United States
- Location: 3004 S. Main St., Goshen, Indiana
- Coordinates: 41°32′40″N 85°49′40″W
- Area: 1.7 acres (0.69 ha)
- Built: c. 1854
- Architectural style: Italianate
- NRHP reference No.: 84001026
- Added to NRHP: September 20, 1984

William N. Violett House, also known as the Jack Dueck Residence, is a historic home located at Goshen, Indiana. It was built about 1854, and is a two-story, T-shaped, Italianate style red brick dwelling. It features cornice brackets, heavy frieze molding, and arched openings.

It was added to the National Register of Historic Places in 1984.
