= Fort Wayne Street Bridge =

- U.S. National Register of Historic Places
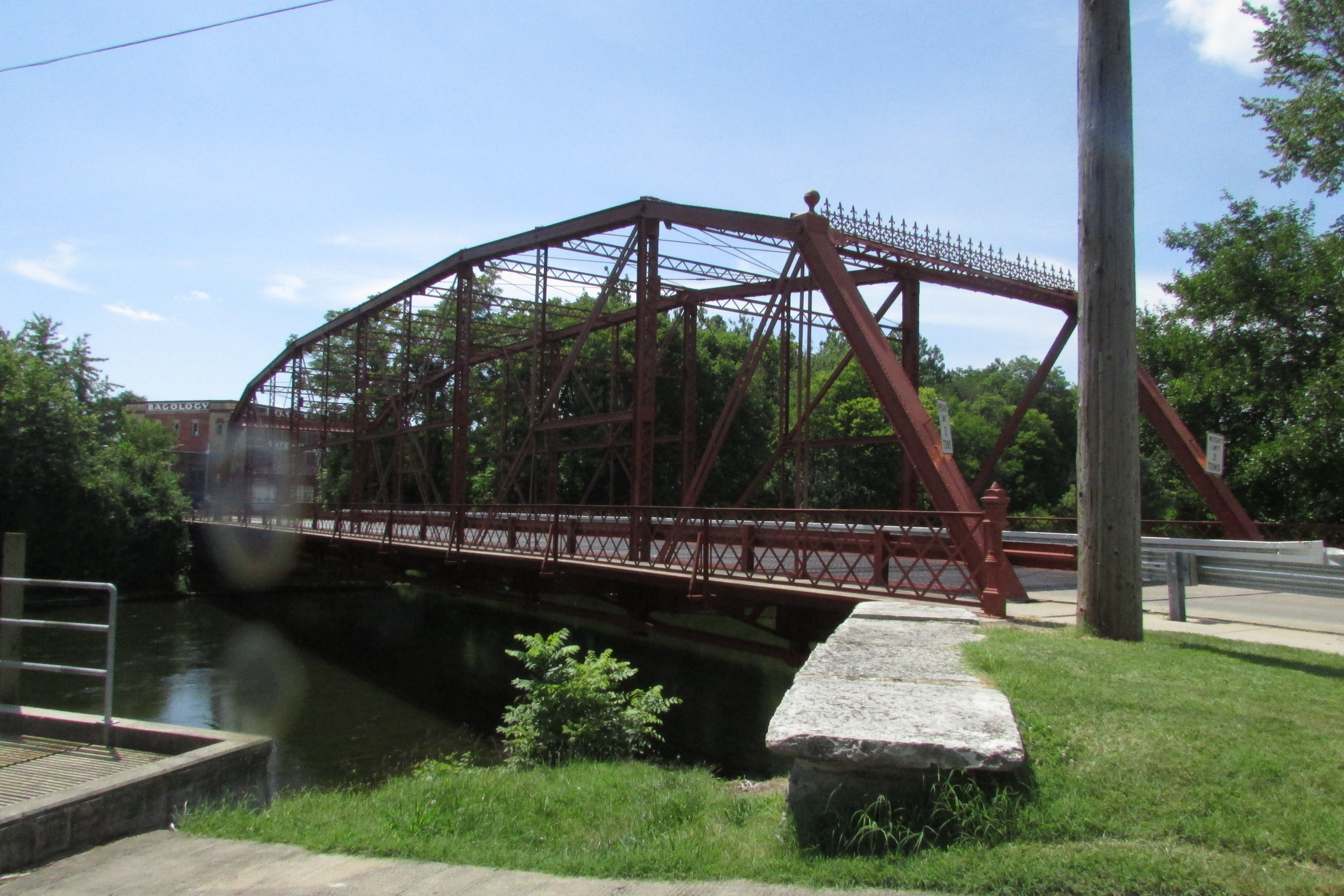
- Fort Wayne Street Bridge, July 2021

- Location within Indiana Location within the United States
- Location: Indiana Ave. over Elkhart R, Goshen, Indiana
- Coordinates: 41°35′36″N 85°50′55″W
- Area: less than one acre
- Built: 1896
- Built by: Bellefontaine Bridge & Iron Co.
- Architectural style: Pennsylvania truss
- NRHP reference No.: 05001018
- Added to NRHP: September 15, 2005

Fort Wayne Street Bridge, also known as the County Bridge #403 and Indiana Avenue Bridge, is a historic Pennsylvania truss bridge located at Goshen, Indiana. It was built in 1896 by the Bellefontaine Bridge & Iron Co. and spans the Elkhart River. The bridge measures 180 feet long and has a 23-foot-wide roadway.

It was added to the National Register of Historic Places in 2005.
