= Goshen Carnegie Public Library =

- U.S. National Register of Historic Places
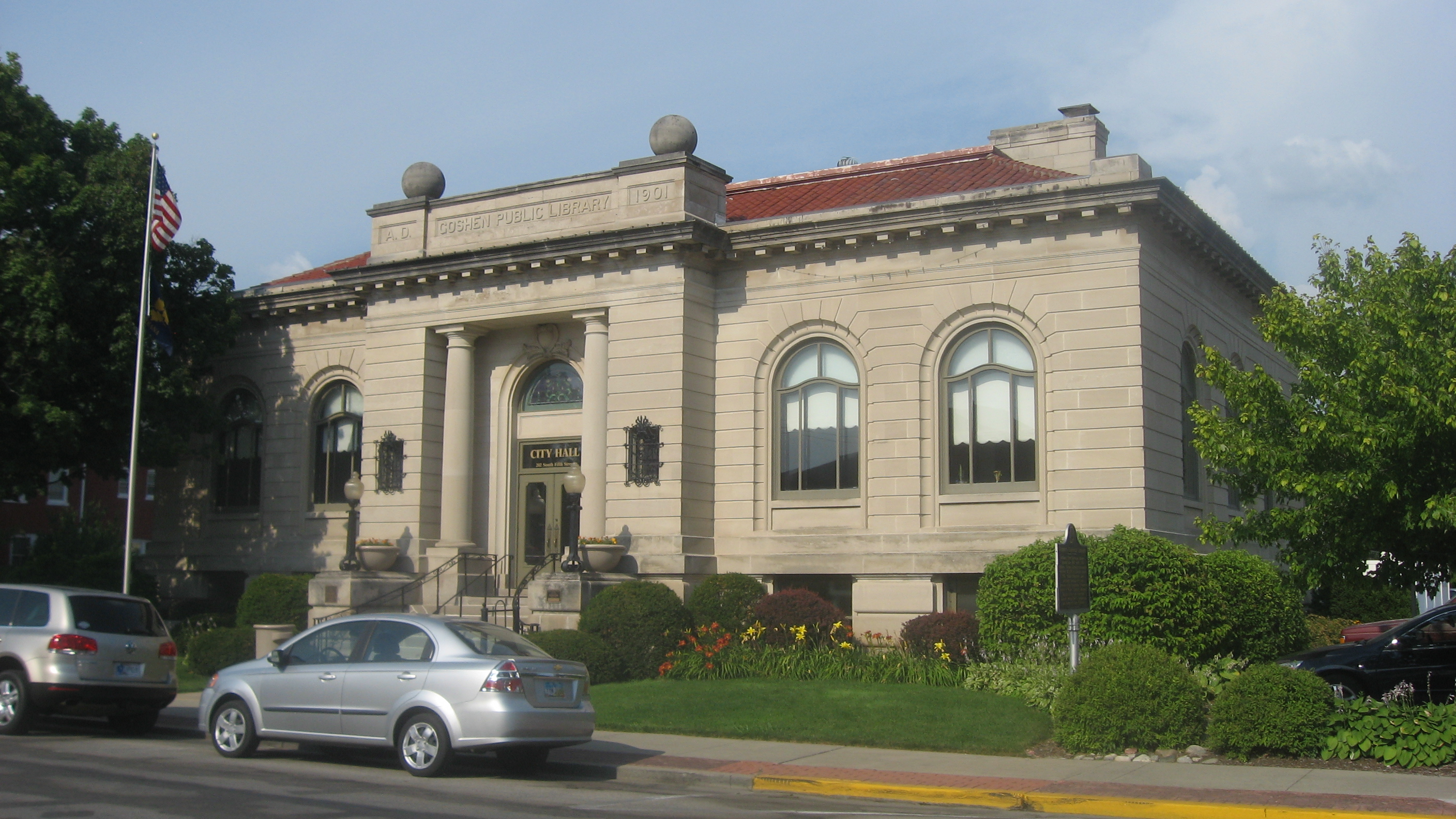
- Goshen Carnegie Public Library, July 2012

- Location within Indiana Location within the United States
- Location: 202 S. 5th St., Goshen, Indiana
- Coordinates: 41°35′6″N 85°49′58″W
- Area: less than one acre
- Built: 1901
- Architect: Patton, Fisher, & Miller of Chicago
- Architectural style: Beaux Arts
- NRHP reference No.: 83000028
- Added to NRHP: February 17, 1983

Goshen Carnegie Public Library, also known as the Goshen Public Library, is a historic Carnegie library located at Goshen, Indiana. It was built in 1901, and is a 1 1/2-story, Beaux-Arts style building clad in Bedford limestone. It has a red tile roof and projecting entrance pavilion with two Tuscan order columns. Its construction was funded with $25,000 provided by the Carnegie Foundation.

It was added to the National Register of Historic Places in 1983.

The building today houses the Goshen City Hall. The current Goshen Public Library is located at 601 South 5th Street.

== Appearance ==
The exterior is unchanged from its original design. It is one and a half stories from street levelt to the eave of the red tile roof. Details from the Ecole des Beaux Arts and clad with Bedford limestone. The front (west) façade features an entrance pavilion. The double door is framed by two Tuscan Order columns with a stained glass transom. The pavilion is capped with a parapet inscribed, '"Goshen Public Library A.D. 1901"'. A stone sphere rests atop each end of the parapet. To the left and right of the entrance are two large, arched windows.

The entry opens into a marble vestibule with a bronze plaque of the original Library Board and Andrew Carnegie. Stairs to the right lead to the basement. Ahead are through the doors is the rotunda or charging room. This room is extensively decorated room. It has terrazzo floors, marble baseboards, and mahogany cabinets with marble counters. The original curved librarian's desk of marble and mahogany has been retained. The dome is painted with floral designs and includes the classical authors. A stained glass skylight, 9 feet (2.7 m) long pierces the center. Corinthian columns and pilasters surround the rotunda. The gilding and color scheme of greens and yellows have been restored to the building.

== Bibliography ==
- Goshen Daily News Times, various issues, 1901 through 1903
- Carnegie Libraries, George S. Bobinski, ALA, 1969

== See also ==
- List of Carnegie libraries in Indiana
