= Elkhart County Courthouse =

- U.S. National Register of Historic Places
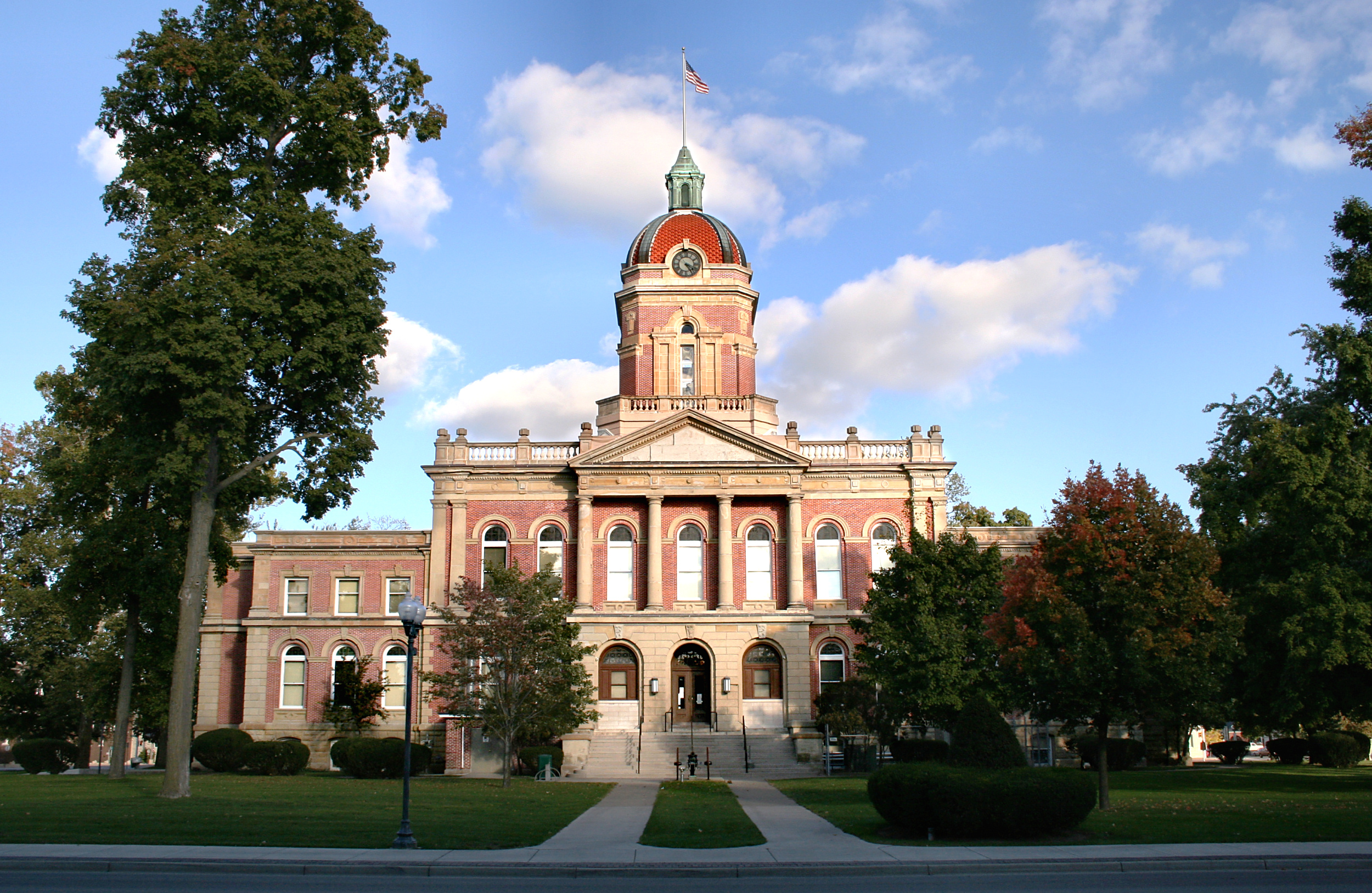
- Elkhart County Courthouse, October 2005

- Location within Indiana Location within the United States
- Location: Courthouse Sq., Goshen, Indiana
- Coordinates: 41°35′14″N 85°50′8″W
- Area: 3.3 acres (1.3 ha)
- Built: 1868-1870, 1905
- Architect: Barrows & Company; Patton & Miller
- Architectural style: Renaissance, Italian Villa
- NRHP reference No.: 80000034
- Added to NRHP: April 10, 1980

The Elkhart County Courthouse is a historic courthouse located in Goshen, Indiana, United States. It was originally built in 1868–1870, and renovated between 1905 and 1908 in the Renaissance Revival style. It is a three-story, brick building with a clay tile dome tower. It features a portico with four freestanding Doric order columns, with stylized triglyphs, set on a rusticated podium.

It was added to the National Register of Historic Places in 1980.

In September 2025, a new Elkhart County courthouse opened in Goshen. The historic courthouse remained in use for other purposes including meetings of the county commissioners.

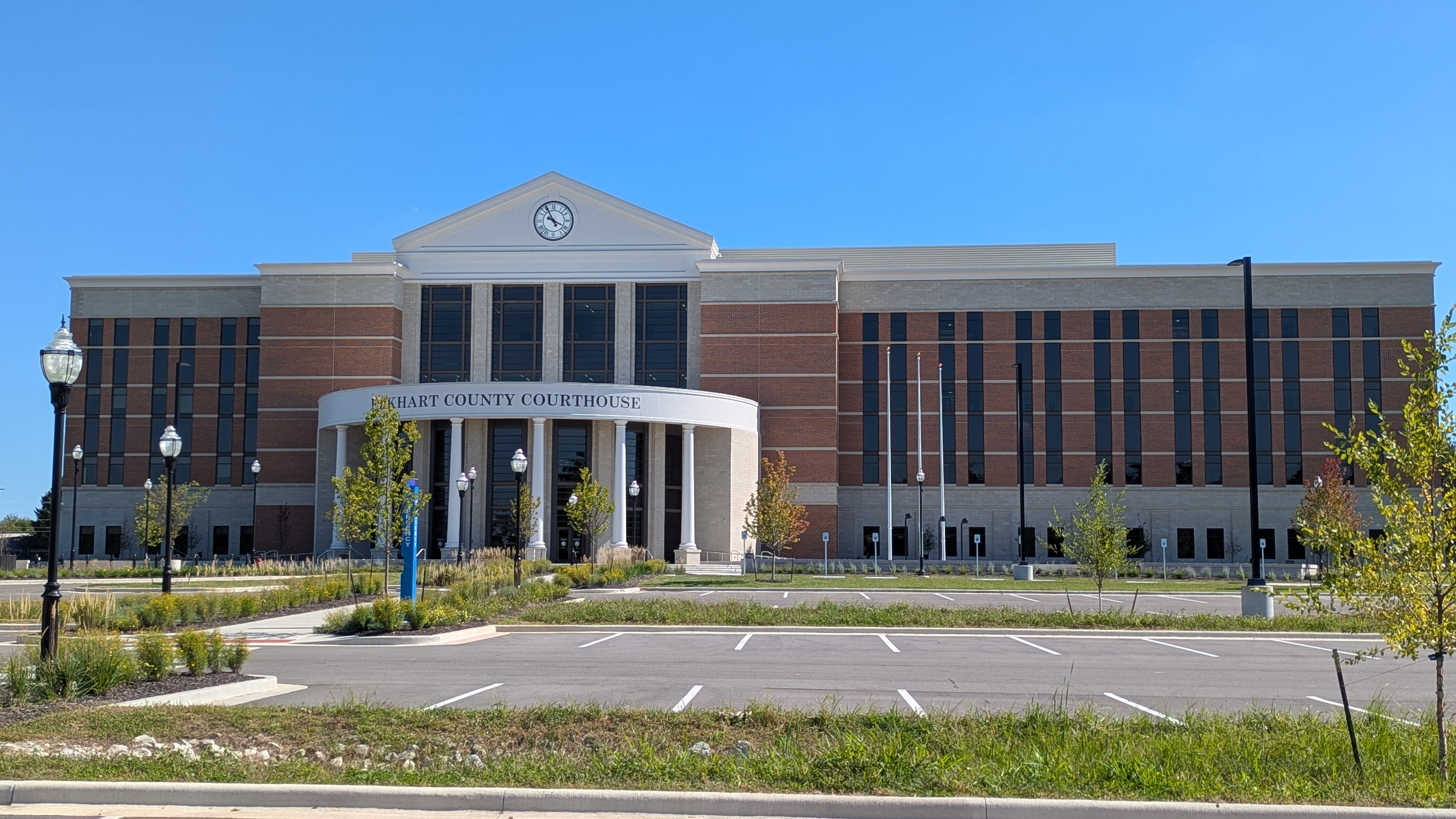
New Elkhart County Courthouse opened in 2025
