= Goshen, Indiana =

- City
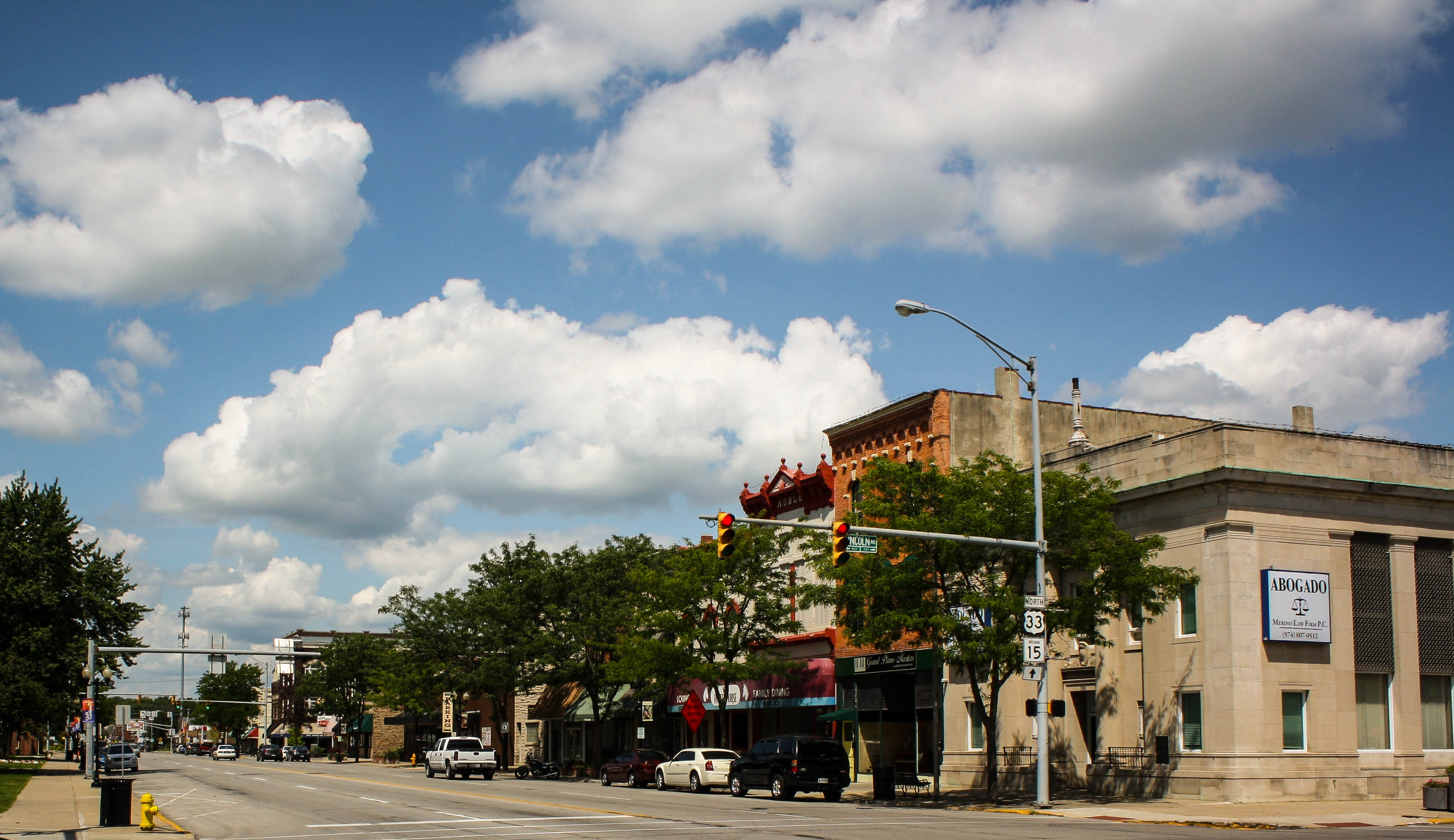
- Downtown Goshen (2015)

- Flag Logo
- Nickname: "The Maple City"
- Location of Goshen in Elkhart County, Indiana.
- Coordinates: 41°34′55″N 85°50′12″W
- Country: United States
- State: Indiana
- County: Elkhart
- Townships: Elkhart, Concord, Jefferson, Harrison

Government
  - Mayor: Gina Leichty (D)

Area
  - Total: 17.95 sq mi (46.50 km^{2})
  - Land: 17.58 sq mi (45.52 km^{2})
  - Water: 0.38 sq mi (0.98 km^{2})
- Elevation: 801 ft (244 m)

Population (2020)
  - Total: 34,517
  - Density: 1,963.9/sq mi (758.28/km^{2})
- Time zone: UTC−5 (EST)
  - Summer (DST): UTC−4 (EDT)
- ZIP codes: 46526-46528
- Area code: 574
- FIPS code: 18-28386
- GNIS feature ID: 0435227
- Website: goshen.in.gov

Goshen (/ˈɡoʊʃən/ GOH-shən) is a city in and the county seat of Elkhart County, Indiana, United States. It is located in the northern part of Indiana near the Michigan border, in a region known as Michiana. Goshen is located 10 miles southeast of Elkhart, 25 miles southeast of South Bend, 120 miles east of Chicago, and 150 miles north of Indianapolis. The population of Goshen was 34,517 at the 2020 census.

The city is known as a prominent recreational vehicle and accessories manufacturing center, the home of Goshen College, a small Mennonite liberal arts college, and the Elkhart County 4-H Fair, one of the largest county fairs in the United States.

== History ==
Before the arrival of white colonists, the land that is today Goshen, Indiana, had been populated by Native Americans, specifically the Miami people, the Peoria people, and Potawatomi peoples, for thousands of years. In 1830, the US Congress passed the Indian Removal Act, requiring all indigenous people to relocate west of the Mississippi River.

Goshen was platted in 1831. It was named after the Land of Goshen. The initial settlers consisted entirely of old stock "Yankee" immigrants, who were descended from the English Puritans who settled New England in the 1600s. The New England Yankee population that founded towns such as Goshen considered themselves the "chosen people", and identified with the Israelites of the Old Testament and they thought of North America as their Canaan. They founded a large number of towns and counties across what is known as the Northern Tier of the upper midwest. It was in this context that Goshen was named.

The Yankee migration to Indiana was a result of several factors, one of which was the overpopulation of New England. The old-stock Yankee population had large families, often bearing up to ten children in one household. Most people were expected to have their own piece of land to farm, and due to the massive and nonstop population boom, land in New England became scarce as every son claimed his own farmstead. As a result, there was not enough land for every family to have a self-sustaining farm, and Yankee settlers began leaving New England for the Midwestern United States.

They were aided in this effort by the construction and completion of the Erie Canal which made traveling to the region much easier, causing an additional surge in migrants coming from New England. Added to this was the end of the Black Hawk War, which made the region much safer for white settlers to travel through and settle in. However, the Black Hawk War also forced the native people who called Goshen home for so long to leave. The 1833 Treaty of Chicago ultimately set the conditions that would force the Potawatomi in particular to leave the Midwest, Goshen included, in 1837. This forced exile is known today as the Potawatomi Trail of Death.

These settlers were primarily members of the Congregational Church, though due to the Second Great Awakening, many of them had converted to Methodism, and some had become Baptists before coming to what is now Indiana. The Congregational Church has subsequently gone through many divisions, and some factions, including those in Goshen, are now known as the Church of Christ and the United Church of Christ. When the New Englanders arrived in what is now Elkhart County there was nothing but a dense virgin forest and wild prairie. They laid out farms, constructed roads, erected government buildings, and established post routes.

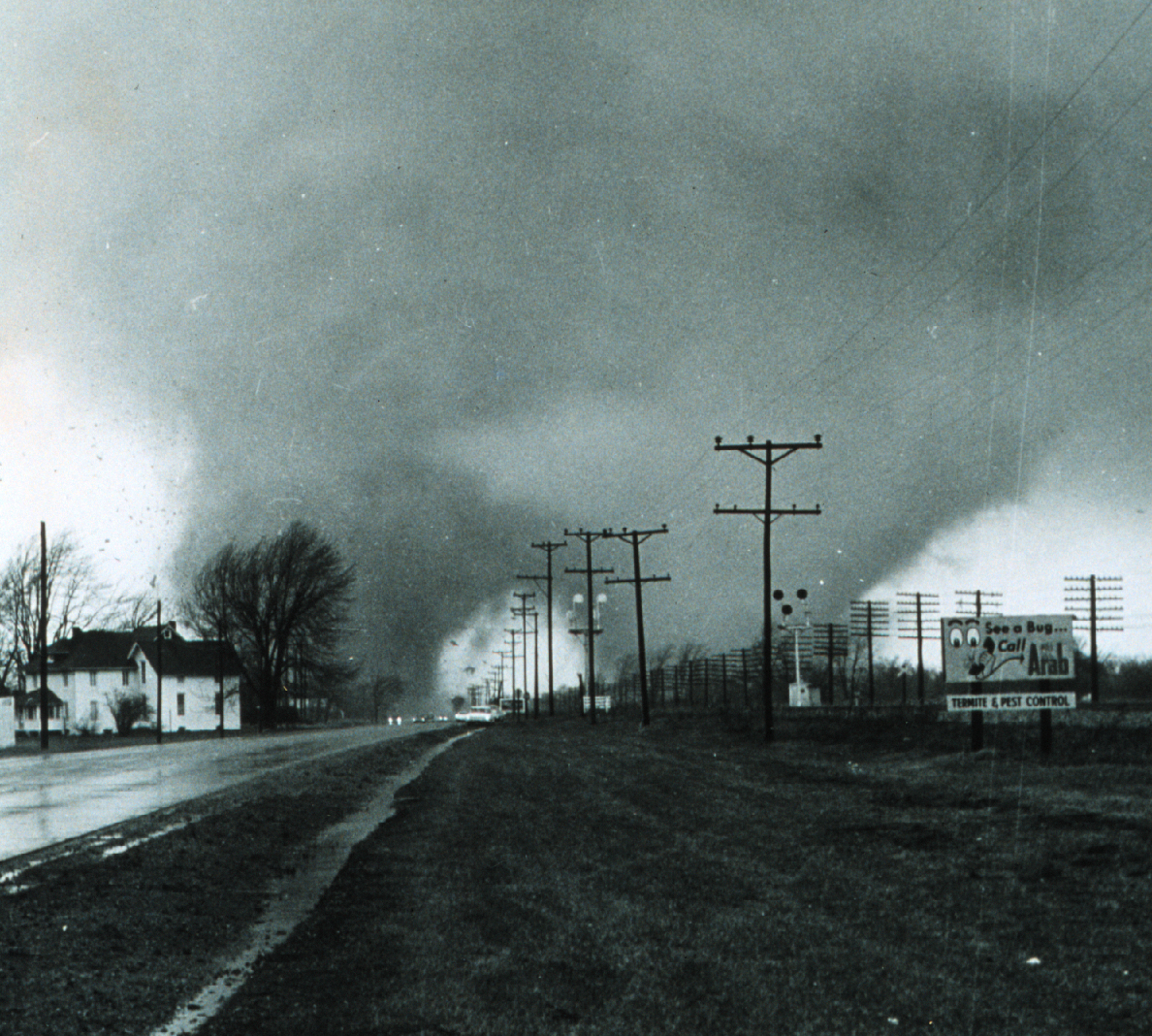
This double tornado hit the Midway Trailer Court northwest of Goshen on U.S. 33, Palm Sunday, 1965.

On Palm Sunday, April 11, 1965, a large outbreak of tornadoes struck the Midwest. The most famous pair of tornadoes devastated the Midway Trailer Park (now inside the city limits of Goshen), and the Sunnyside Housing Addition in Dunlap, Indiana. Another, smaller F4 tornado also struck neighborhoods on the southeast side of Goshen on the same day. Statewide, 137 Hoosiers died in the storms—55 of them in Elkhart County. Days later, President Lyndon B. Johnson visited the Dunlap site.

The Goshen Historic District, added in 1983 to the National Register of Historic Places is bounded by Pike, RR, Cottage, Plymouth, Main, Purl, the Canal, and Second Sts. with the Elkhart County Courthouse at its center.

In April 2006, Goshen was the site of an immigration march. Officials estimated that from 2,000 to 3,000 people marched from Linway Plaza to the County Courthouse.

Goshen has been called a "sundown town", and African Americans were allegedly prevented from living in, or entering, the town, under threat of violence. While there was never a city ordinance or official policy to enforce such a restriction, the city issued a formal apology in March 2015 for racial discrimination in the past. A documentary made at Goshen College, Goshen: A Sundown Town's Transformation, tells the story of why Goshen has been called a sundown town.

The Elkhart County Courthouse, Fort Wayne Street Bridge, Goshen Carnegie Public Library, Goshen Historic District, William N. Violett House, and Violett-Martin House and Gardens are listed on the National Register of Historic Places.

== Geography ==
Goshen is located at 41°34′55″N 85°50′12″W. The Elkhart River winds its way through the city and through a dam on the south side making the Goshen Dam Pond. Rock Run Creek also runs through town. The city is divided east–west by Main Street and north–south by Lincoln Avenue.

According to the United States Census Bureau, the city has a total area of 16.59 square miles (42.97 km^{2}), of which 16.23 square miles (42.04 km^{2}) is land and 0.36 square miles (0.93 km^{2}) is water.

=== Environmental leadership ===
In February 2018, the Elkhart River flooded as a result of heavy rain and snowmelt. The river rose to a record 13.2 feet, damaging more than 300 structures and prompting evacuations. City government has responded to the increase in severe weather such as flooding, hail, and heavy rains with measures including stormwater management, and "an initiative to grow the town's tree canopy by 45%". Goshen completed 92 solar projects and produced 116 watts of solar power per capita in 2019.

=== Climate ===
Climate data for Goshen, Indiana (1991–2020 normals, extremes 1914–present)
| Month | Jan | Feb | Mar | Apr | May | Jun | Jul | Aug | Sep | Oct | Nov | Dec | Year |
|---|---|---|---|---|---|---|---|---|---|---|---|---|---|
| Record high °F (°C) | 68 (20) | 73 (23) | 87 (31) | 88 (31) | 95 (35) | 104 (40) | 111 (44) | 106 (41) | 101 (38) | 90 (32) | 80 (27) | 69 (21) | 111 (44) |
| Mean maximum °F (°C) | 52.9 (11.6) | 56.0 (13.3) | 70.1 (21.2) | 79.7 (26.5) | 87.0 (30.6) | 92.1 (33.4) | 92.4 (33.6) | 90.7 (32.6) | 89.2 (31.8) | 81.4 (27.4) | 67.3 (19.6) | 55.2 (12.9) | 94.2 (34.6) |
| Mean daily maximum °F (°C) | 31.7 (−0.2) | 35.5 (1.9) | 47.2 (8.4) | 60.3 (15.7) | 71.7 (22.1) | 80.4 (26.9) | 83.3 (28.5) | 81.3 (27.4) | 75.2 (24.0) | 62.8 (17.1) | 48.4 (9.1) | 36.5 (2.5) | 59.5 (15.3) |
| Daily mean °F (°C) | 24.7 (−4.1) | 27.9 (−2.3) | 38.0 (3.3) | 49.5 (9.7) | 60.8 (16.0) | 70.0 (21.1) | 73.1 (22.8) | 71.3 (21.8) | 64.5 (18.1) | 53.0 (11.7) | 40.6 (4.8) | 30.1 (−1.1) | 50.3 (10.2) |
| Mean daily minimum °F (°C) | 17.8 (−7.9) | 20.2 (−6.6) | 28.8 (−1.8) | 38.7 (3.7) | 49.9 (9.9) | 59.6 (15.3) | 62.8 (17.1) | 61.3 (16.3) | 53.9 (12.2) | 43.3 (6.3) | 32.8 (0.4) | 23.7 (−4.6) | 41.1 (5.1) |
| Mean minimum °F (°C) | −4.6 (−20.3) | 0.2 (−17.7) | 10.4 (−12.0) | 23.6 (−4.7) | 34.8 (1.6) | 45.2 (7.3) | 50.9 (10.5) | 49.8 (9.9) | 39.4 (4.1) | 29.1 (−1.6) | 18.3 (−7.6) | 4.3 (−15.4) | −8.6 (−22.6) |
| Record low °F (°C) | −25 (−32) | −21 (−29) | −19 (−28) | 1 (−17) | 24 (−4) | 32 (0) | 39 (4) | 37 (3) | 25 (−4) | 16 (−9) | −5 (−21) | −25 (−32) | −25 (−32) |
| Average precipitation inches (mm) | 2.78 (71) | 2.33 (59) | 2.44 (62) | 3.79 (96) | 4.27 (108) | 4.12 (105) | 3.99 (101) | 4.05 (103) | 3.27 (83) | 3.33 (85) | 2.96 (75) | 2.52 (64) | 39.85 (1,012) |
| Average snowfall inches (cm) | 13.8 (35) | 11.4 (29) | 5.4 (14) | 1.2 (3.0) | 0.0 (0.0) | 0.0 (0.0) | 0.0 (0.0) | 0.0 (0.0) | 0.0 (0.0) | 0.1 (0.25) | 3.4 (8.6) | 9.9 (25) | 45.2 (115) |
| Average precipitation days (≥ 0.01 in) | 13.4 | 11.2 | 10.8 | 12.0 | 11.7 | 10.9 | 10.1 | 9.8 | 9.1 | 11.2 | 11.5 | 12.3 | 134.0 |
| Average snowy days (≥ 0.1 in) | 10.4 | 8.6 | 4.3 | 1.0 | 0.0 | 0.0 | 0.0 | 0.0 | 0.0 | 0.2 | 2.8 | 7.3 | 34.6 |
Source: NOAA

== Demographics ==
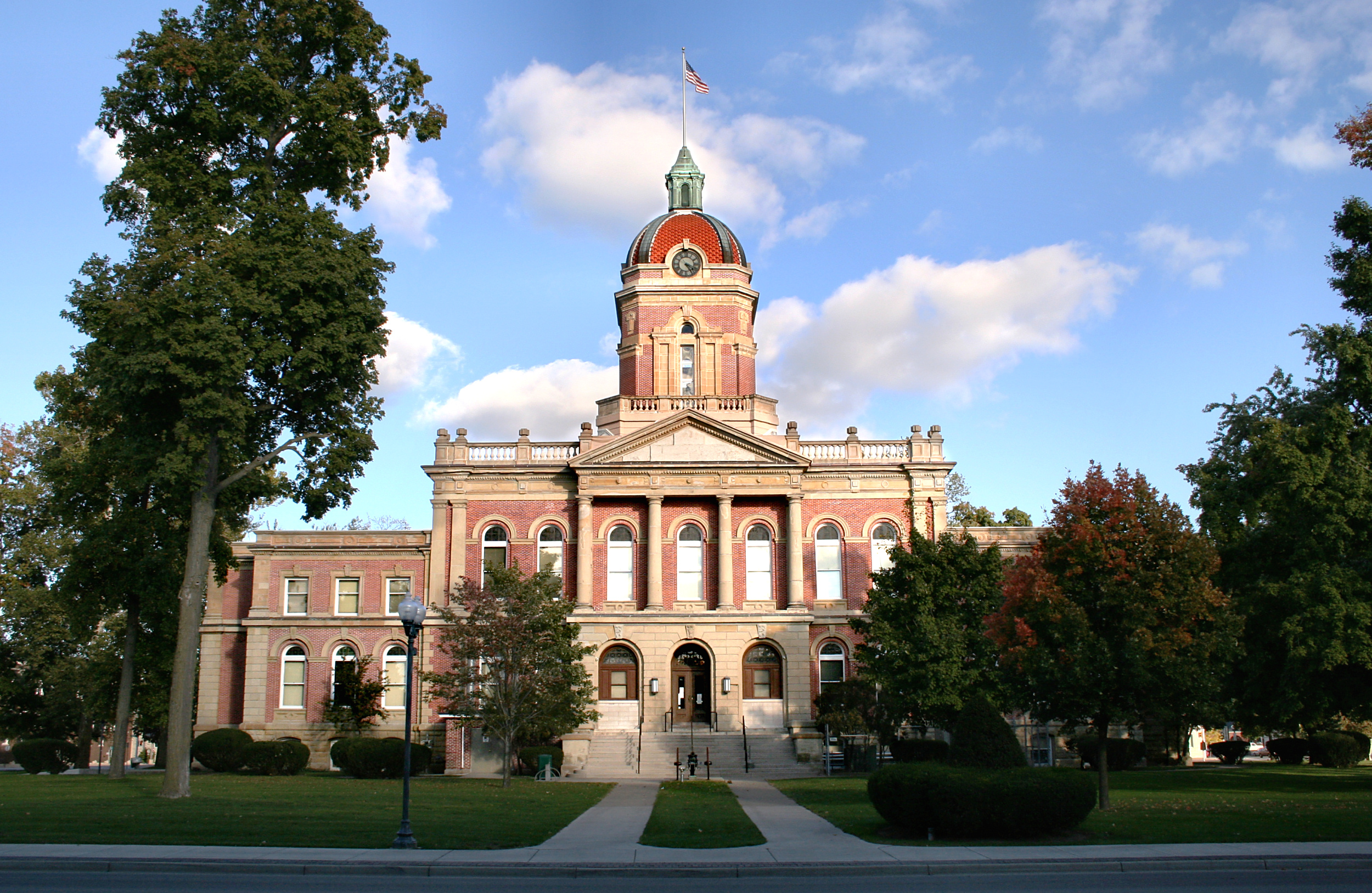
Elkhart County courthouse in Goshen.

Historical population
| Census | Pop. | Note | %± |
|---|---|---|---|
| 1850 | 780 | | — |
| 1860 | 2,053 | | 163.2% |
| 1870 | 3,133 | | 52.6% |
| 1880 | 4,123 | | 31.6% |
| 1890 | 6,033 | | 46.3% |
| 1900 | 7,810 | | 29.5% |
| 1910 | 8,514 | | 9.0% |
| 1920 | 9,525 | | 11.9% |
| 1930 | 10,397 | | 9.2% |
| 1940 | 11,375 | | 9.4% |
| 1950 | 13,003 | | 14.3% |
| 1960 | 13,718 | | 5.5% |
| 1970 | 17,871 | | 30.3% |
| 1980 | 19,665 | | 10.0% |
| 1990 | 23,797 | | 21.0% |
| 2000 | 29,383 | | 23.5% |
| 2010 | 31,719 | | 8.0% |
| 2020 | 34,517 | | 8.8% |
U.S. Decennial Census 2010–2020

=== Racial and ethnic composition ===
Goshen city, Indiana – Racial and ethnic composition Note: the US Census treats Hispanic/Latino as an ethnic category. This table excludes Latinos from the racial categories and assigns them to a separate category. Hispanics/Latinos may be of any race.
| Race / Ethnicity (NH = Non-Hispanic) | Pop 2010 | Pop 2020 | % 2010 | % 2020 |
|---|---|---|---|---|
| White alone (NH) | 21,140 | 20,057 | 66.65% | 58.11% |
| Black or African American alone (NH) | 740 | 1,079 | 2.33% | 3.13% |
| Native American or Alaska Native alone (NH) | 72 | 45 | 0.23% | 0.13% |
| Asian alone (NH) | 376 | 471 | 1.19% | 1.36% |
| Native Hawaiian or Pacific Islander alone (NH) | 9 | 13 | 0.03% | 0.04% |
| Other race alone (NH) | 38 | 120 | 0.12% | 0.35% |
| Mixed race or Multiracial (NH) | 441 | 1,083 | 1.39% | 3.14% |
| Hispanic or Latino (any race) | 8,903 | 11,649 | 28.07% | 33.75% |
| Total | 31,719 | 34,517 | 100.00% | 100.00% |

=== 2020 census ===
As of the 2020 census, Goshen had a population of 34,517. The median age was 35.2 years. 25.8% of residents were under the age of 18 and 17.8% of residents were 65 years of age or older. For every 100 females there were 94.3 males, and for every 100 females age 18 and over there were 91.7 males age 18 and over.

99.9% of residents lived in urban areas, while 0.1% lived in rural areas.

There were 12,720 households in Goshen, of which 33.7% had children under the age of 18 living in them. Of all households, 45.6% were married-couple households, 18.1% were households with a male householder and no spouse or partner present, and 28.3% were households with a female householder and no spouse or partner present. About 28.3% of all households were made up of individuals and 13.7% had someone living alone who was 65 years of age or older.

There were 13,577 housing units, of which 6.3% were vacant. The homeowner vacancy rate was 1.1% and the rental vacancy rate was 7.3%.

Racial composition as of the 2020 census
| Race | Number | Percent |
|---|---|---|
| White | 22,021 | 63.8% |
| Black or African American | 1,136 | 3.3% |
| American Indian and Alaska Native | 394 | 1.1% |
| Asian | 485 | 1.4% |
| Native Hawaiian and Other Pacific Islander | 15 | 0.0% |
| Some other race | 6,336 | 18.4% |
| Two or more races | 4,130 | 12.0% |
| Hispanic or Latino (of any race) | 11,649 | 33.7% |

=== 2010 census ===
As of the census of 2010, there were 31,719 people, 11,344 households, and 7,580 families residing in the city. The population density was 1,954.3 inhabitants per square mile (754.6/km^{2}). There were 12,631 housing units at an average density of 778.3 per square mile (300.5/km^{2}). The racial makeup of the city was 78.2% White, 2.6% African American, 0.5% Native American, 1.2% Asian, 14.8% from other races, and 2.7% from two or more races. Hispanic or Latino of any race were 28.1% of the population.

There were 11,344 households, of which 36.1% had children under the age of 18 living with them, 47.4% were married couples living together, 13.1% had a female householder with no husband present, 6.3% had a male householder with no wife present, and 33.2% were non-families. 27.4% of all households were made up of individuals, and 13.2% had someone who was 65 years of age or older living alone. The average household size was 2.67, and the average family size was 3.23.

The median age in the city was 32.4 years. 27.4% of residents were under 18; 11.3% were between the ages of 18 and 24; 26.1% were from 25 to 44; 20% were from 45 to 64, and 14.9% were 65 years of age or older. The gender makeup of the city was 48.9% male and 51.1% female.

=== 2000 census ===
As of the census of 2000, there were 29,383 people, 10,675 households, and 7,088 families residing in the city. The population density was 2,227.7 inhabitants per square mile (860.1/km^{2}). There were 11,264 housing units at an average density of 854.0 per square mile (329.7/km^{2}). The racial makeup of the city was 83.15% White, 1.53% Black or African American, 0.26% Native American, 1.10% Asian, 0.02% Pacific Islander, 12.00% from other races, and 1.94% from two or more races. 19.33% of the population were Hispanic or Latino of any race.

There were 10,675 households, of which 32.6% had children under 18 living with them, 50.8% were married couples living together, 10.1% had a female householder with no husband present, and 33.6% were non-families. 27.5% of all households were made up of individuals, and 12.5% had someone living alone who was 65 years of age or older. The average household size was 2.61, and the average family size was 3.14.

In the city, the population was spread out, with 25.9% under 18, 12.9% from 18 to 24, 30.0% from 25 to 44, 17.6% from 45 to 64, and 13.6% who were 65 years of age or older. The median age was 32 years. For every 100 females, there were 100.6 males. For every 100 females aged 18 and over, there were 97.7 males.

The median income for a household in the city was $39,383, and the median income for a family was $46,877. Males had a median income of $32,159 versus $23,290 for females. The per capita income for the city was $18,899. About 6.0% of families and 9.3% of the population were below the poverty line, including 11.8% of those under age 18 and 5.3% of those aged 65 or over.

== Economy ==
Industry in Goshen centers around the automotive and recreational vehicle business. There are automotive component manufacturers such as Benteler; firms that build custom bodies onto chassis such as Supreme, Independent Protection, and Showhauler Trucks. RV manufacturing companies include Dutchmen, Forest River, and Keystone.

== Government ==
The government consists of a mayor, a clerk-treasurer, a city council, and a youth advisor. The mayor and clerk are elected in a citywide vote. The city council consists of seven members. Five are elected from individual districts. Two are elected at large. The youth advisor position was added in 2016 and is elected by the students of Goshen High School.

Gina Leichty, a member of the Democratic Party, is the first woman to become Mayor of Goshen in its 192-year history. Leichty became Mayor following the resignation of former mayor Jeremy Stutsman. Stutsman left the mayorship to be CEO of a local nonprofit housing agency, LaCasa.

== Education ==
Goshen Community Schools serves the portion of the city in Elkhart Township. This system consists of six elementary schools, Goshen Intermediate School, Goshen Junior High School, and Goshen High School.

In 2012, U.S. News & World Report ranked Goshen High School as the 12th-best high school in Indiana and the top 6% of high schools in the country.

Small parts of the city of Goshen are covered by several other school districts, including Middlebury Community Schools, Concord Community Schools, and WaNee Community Schools.

Additionally, Goshen is served by Bethany Christian Schools, a private Christian school for grades 4–12.

Goshen College, located on the south side of town, has an enrollment of approximately 773, with 37% male and 63% female. Tuition and fees for the 2024–2025 year were $38,890.

The town has a free lending library, the Goshen Public Library.

== Transportation ==
=== Airports ===
Goshen Municipal Airport is a public-use airport located about 3.5 miles southeast of downtown Goshen. The Goshen Board of Aviation Commissioners owns the airport.

The closest airports with regularly scheduled commercial service are South Bend International Airport (about 36 miles (58 km) away) and Fort Wayne International Airport (about 61 miles (98 km) away). O'Hare International Airport in Chicago is about 141 miles (227 km) away.

=== Bus ===
The Interurban Trolley bus connects Goshen to the nearby city of Elkhart and the unincorporated town of Dunlap via Concord and Elkhart-Goshen routes. The routes pass at Elkhart's Amtrak station, allowing passengers to connect to the Capitol Limited and Lake Shore Limited trains. Riders can also transfer to the North Pointe and Bittersweet/Mishawaka routes. The former allows riders to connect to Elkhart's Greyhound bus station, while the later connects the riders to the city of Mishawaka and town of Osceola. The Bittersweet/Mishawaka route also allows them to transfer to TRANSPO Route 9 to connect to destinations throughout the South Bend-Goshen metropolitan region and the South Shore Line's South Bend International Airport station.

== Recreation ==
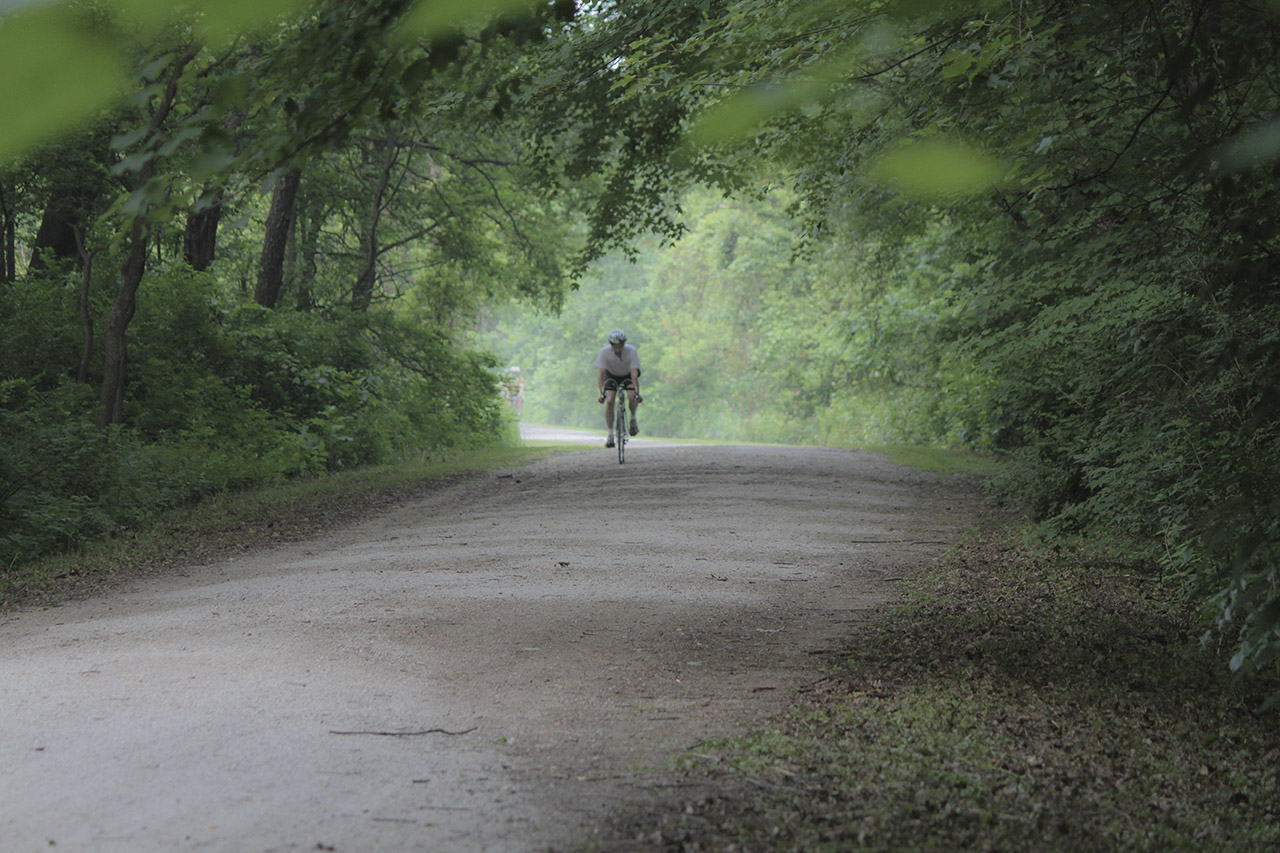
Pumpkinvine Nature Trail

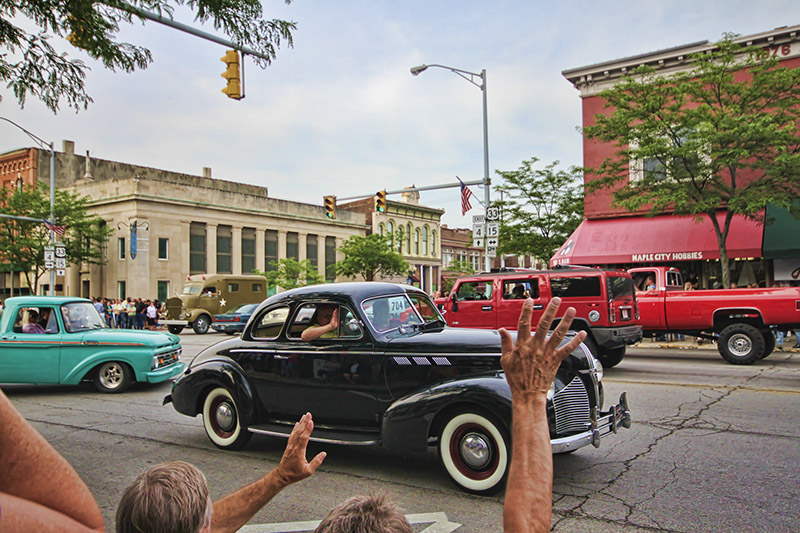
Cruising on First Friday, July 2011.

Goshen has seven parks and has a few different greenways and trails winding through the city, one of which runs along the old Mill Race and hydraulic canal, which was once used to power an old hydroelectric power plant. Plans were drawn up in 2005 call for the plant to be reopened and redevelopment to begin along the canal.

The Pumpkinvine Nature Trail runs from Goshen to Middlebury and Shipshewana, along the former Pumpkin Vine Railroad. The trail starts northeast of Goshen at Abshire Park. It is one of the recreational highlights of Goshen. Along with the Maple City Greenway and the Millrace trail, they provide many miles of easily accessible trails for walking, running, and biking.

The Elkhart County Fairgrounds are also located in the city, where the Elkhart County 4-H Fair is held in late July. It is the largest county fair in Indiana and one of the largest 4-H County Fairs in the United States.

The Goshen Air Show is also an annual event that takes place at the Goshen Municipal Airport.

== Culture ==
The south side Wal-Mart is rumored to be the first Wal-Mart in the United States to provide a covered stable for its frequent Amish customers. The Amish built the stable with lumber and other supplies donated by Wal-Mart.

Lonesome Jim (2005) which was written by former resident James Strouse, directed by Steve Buscemi and starred Liv Tyler and Casey Affleck, was shot in Goshen.

== Notable people ==
=== Mayors of Goshen ===
| Name | Term | End date | Pol. Party |
|---|---|---|---|
| Henry Daniel Wilson | May 1868 | May 1869 | Dem. |
| Melvin Barnes Hascall | May 1869 | May 1871 | |
| Joseph A S Mitchell | May 1871 | May 1873 | Dem. |
| George Freese Sr | May 1873 | May 1875 | Republ., Prohibitionist |
| Charles Bidwell Alderman | 1875; 1877; 1879; | May 1882 | Dem. |
| Philemon Doud Harding | May 1882 | May 1884 | Dem. |
| Josiah B. Cobb | May 1884 | May 1886 | Republi. |
| Philemon Doud Harding | 1886 See Above | May 1888 | Dem |
| Charles Wesley Miller | May 1888 | May 1890 | Republ. |
| John H. Lesh | May 1890 | May 1892 | Republ. |
| John B. Walk | May 1892 | Sept 1894 | Republ. |
| Dr Joseph H Heatwole | 1894; 1896 | July 1898 | Republ. |
| Benjamin F Deahl | Filled Unexpired term (July 1898 – May 1900); 1900–1902 | May 1902 | Dem. |
| George Finely Alderman | 5/1/1902 | May.1904 | Dem. |
| Alfred Lowry | 1/1/1904 | Dec. 1906 | Republ. |
| Charles Kohler | 1/1/1906 | Dec. 1908 | Dem. |
| Samuel Franklin Spohn | 1/1/1909 | Dec. 1918 | Dem. |
| Daniel Jackson "DJ" Troyer | Jan. 1918 | Apr. 1919 | Republ. |
| William Herbert Charnley | Apr. 1919 | Dec. 1918 | Republ. |
| George R. Rimpler | Jan. 1922 | Dec. 1925 | Dem. |
| John Orrien Abshire | Jan. 1926 | Dec. 1929 | |
| Clell Eugene Firestone | Dec. 1930; 1934 | Dec. 1938 | Dem. |
| Gordon Douglas Pease | Jan. 1938 | Dec. 1942 | Republ. |
| Frank S. Ebersole | Jan. 1943 | Dec. 1947 | Republ. |
| Rollin Richard Roth Sr | Jan. 1948 | Dec. 1955 | Republ. |
| Ray Bernard Messick | Jan. 1956–59 | Dec. 1963 | |
| Ralph Bowman Schenk | Jan. 1964; 1968; | Dec. 1975 | Republ. |
| Steven Regis Chisick | Jan. 1976 | Dec. 1979 | Dem. |
| Max Ronald Chiddister | Jan. 1980 | Dec. 1987 | Republ. |
| Michael S. Puro | Jan. 1988 | Mar.1997 | Dem. |
| Allan J. Kauffman | Apr. 1997 | Dec. 2015 | Dem. |
| Jeremy P. Stutsman | Jan. 2016 | Jun. 2023 | Dem. |
| Gina M. Leichty | Jun. 2023 | | Dem. |

=== Politicians ===
- John Baker, U.S. Representative from Indiana (1832–1915)
- Ebenezer M. Chamberlain, U.S. Representative from Indiana (1805–1861)
- Joseph Hutton Defrees, U.S. Representative from Indiana (1812–1885)
- Charles W. Miller, Indiana Attorney General, mayor of Goshen
- Joseph Mitchell, Justice of the Indiana Supreme Court, third mayor of Goshen

=== Entertainment ===
- James Carew, silent film actor (1876–1938)
- Howard Hawks, film director (1896–1977)
- Kenneth Hawks, film director (1898–1930)
- Philip Proctor, comedian and actor, Firesign Theatre (b. 1940)
- Raymond L. Schrock, screenwriter (1892–1950)
- Tim Showalter, musician (Strand of Oaks)
- James C. Strouse, screenwriter
- Jordon Hodges, actor
- Lotus, band (formed at Goshen College, 1998)
- Lil Aaron, musician

=== Sports ===
- Shek Borkowski, coach of Haiti national soccer team
- Eric Carpenter, soccer player
- Rick Mirer, quarterback in the NFL
- Patricia Roy, AAGPBL player and IHSAA commissioner
- Doug Weaver, college football player and head coach
- Justin Yoder, soap box racer

=== Other ===
- Kate Bolduan, CNN anchor
- Lois Gunden, a Righteous Among the Nations (1915–2005)
- Frederick A. Herring, physician and botanist (1812–1908)
- Ida Shepard Oldroyd, conchologist and curator (1856–1940)
- Andrew Tate, social media influencer

== Sister cities ==
Goshen has two sister cities as designated by Sister Cities International.

- Bexbach, Saarland, Germany
- Emmeloord, Flevoland, Netherlands

== See also ==
- List of sundown towns in the United States
