= WDND (1490 AM) =

- South Bend, Indiana; United States
- Broadcast area: South Bend, Indiana
- Frequency: 1490 kHz

History
- First air date: 1944; 82 years ago
- Last air date: April 29, 2009; 17 years ago
- Former call signs: WHOT (1944–1955); WNDU (1955–1998); WNDV (1998–2006); WDND (2006–2009); WPNT (2009–2011)

Technical information
- Facility ID: 41673
- Class: C
- Power: 1,000 watts unlimited
- Transmitter coordinates: 41°41′38.2″N 86°13′50″W

WDND (1490 AM) was a radio station licensed to serve the South Bend, Indiana, United States, area. The WDND call letters were the last ones used before the station went silent. While silent, the station call sign was changed to WPNT, although these call letters were never used on-the-air before the station was deleted.

== History ==
=== WHOT ===
The station began broadcasting in 1944 and held the call sign WHOT. WHOT aired a full service format, with music, news, talk, comedy, drama, and variety programs, along with a Polish program mornings and religious programs on Sundays. Bob Bell worked at WHOT in the late 1940s. In 1954, WHOT was sold to the University of Notre Dame for $140,000.

=== WNDU ===
In 1955, the station's call sign was changed to WNDU. The station aired an oldies format from the mid- to late-1970s. In 1979, the station adopted a contemporary hits format, with extra disco at night. WNDU aired a country music format in the 1980s. In 1990, the station adopted an oldies format. In 1995, the station switched to an all 1970s music format, with programming from Westwood One. In 1998, the University of Notre Dame sold WNDU and sister station 92.9 WNDU-FM to Artistic Media Partners.

=== WNDV ===
On November 23, 1998, the station's call sign was changed to WNDV, while its sister station's call sign was changed to WNDV-FM. In 1999, the station began simulcasting the contemporary hits format of its FM sister station, 92.9 WNDV-FM.

=== WDND ===
In 2006, the station adopted the sports talk format which had been airing on AM 1580 WDND, and 1490's call sign was changed to WDND on May 5, 2006. WDND was an affiliate of ESPN Radio. The station was off the air for a period in January 2007, after its tower fell during a storm.

=== End of operations ===
On April 29, 2009, the station was taken off the air, in preparation for its transmitting tower site on the Notre Dame campus to be dismantled to make way for the Compton Family Ice Arena. Artistic moved the WDND call sign and its sports format to 1620 AM. The former callsign of the 1620 station, WPNT, were assigned to the silent 1490 operation on May 13, 2009. On May 11, 2011, the license for 1490 AM was canceled by the FCC.
