= WUBU (FM) =

Coordinates: 41.727°N 86.408°W

- New Carlisle, Indiana; United States
- Broadcast area: South Bend, Indiana
- Frequency: 102.3 MHz
- Branding: The New Mix 102.3

Programming
- Format: Urban adult contemporary
- Affiliations: Premiere Networks

Ownership
- Owner: Artistic Media Partners; (Sound Management, LLC)
- Sister stations: WNDV-FM; WZOW-FM

History
- First air date: July 2, 1991
- Former call signs: WSPW (1989); WERQ (1989); WGTC (1989–2002); WZUW (2002–2003); WWLV (2003–2004); WOZW (2004–2006); WZOW (2006–2008); WOZW (2008); WSMM (2008–2016); WYET (2016–2023)

Technical information
- Licensing authority: FCC
- Facility ID: 63772
- Class: A
- ERP: 2,000 watts
- HAAT: 121 meters (397 ft)

Links
- Public license information: Public file; LMS
- Webcast: Listen live
- Website: thenewmix1023.com

WUBU (102.3 FM) is a commercial radio station licensed to New Carlisle, Indiana, United States. Owned by Sound Management (d/b/a Artistic Media Partners), it broadcasts an urban adult contemporary format targeting the South Bend, Indiana market. The studios and offices are on Cleveland Road in South Bend.

== History ==
In October 2016, WYXX broke away from its simulcast of WSMM's classic hits format, "The Stream". Later that same month, the station flipped to a 1980s centric format as "All '80s 102.3" with new call sign WYET. After several format adjustments, WYET rebranded as "Throwback 102.3" at noon on September 3, 2021; the first song as "Throwback" was "Everybody Have Fun Tonight" by Wang Chung.

On September 1, 2023, at noon, after signing off the "Throwback" format with an hour of songs themed around departure or change in some fashion (ending with "Changes" by Tupac Shakur), WYET flipped to urban adult contemporary, branded as "The New 102.3, Michiana's Home for R&B and Old School". The flip capitalized on WUBU (106.3 FM)'s impending drop of the format following its sale to VCY America (to the point of running liners advising listeners to change to the station after the move). The first song on "The New 102.3" was "In Da Club" by 50 Cent. After WUBU signed off that October, the "Mix" branding was immediately claimed by WYET, and WUBU host "The Godfather Gino J" Johnson moved his afternoon and weekend programs to 102.3. The WUBU call sign would be picked up by 102.3 on December 17.
