= WVSB (FM) =

South Bend, Indiana; United States
- Broadcast area: South Bend Metropolitan Area
- Frequency: 106.3 MHz
- Branding: VCY America

Programming
- Format: Christian radio
- Network: VCY America

Ownership
- Owner: VCY America, Inc.

History
- First air date: October 1992
- Former call signs: WGRT (1990); WMXH (1990–1992); WUBU (1992–2023)

Technical information
- Licensing authority: FCC
- Facility ID: 21927
- Class: A
- ERP: 1,400 watts
- HAAT: 134.8 meters (442 ft)
- Transmitter coordinates: 41°36′59″N 86°11′44″W

Links
- Public license information: Public file; LMS
- Webcast: Listen live
- Website: www.vcy.org

WVSB (106.3 FM) is a radio station licensed to South Bend, Indiana, United States, and serving the South Bend market. The station is owned by VCY America and airs a Christian format.

== History ==
The station began broadcasting in October 1992, and held the call sign WUBU. It originally aired an urban adult contemporary format. In late 1992, the station was sold by Goodrich Broadcasting to Focus Radio for $300,000.

On July 28, 2023, it was announced that WUBU would be sold to VCY America, who filed to change the call sign to WVSB, for $425,000. On September 29, 2023, the station went silent and its online presence was erased with the website redirecting to the website of country-formatted WBYT and its social media pages being deleted. The sale was consummated on November 9, 2023, with the call sign changing to WVSB on November 17. The station returned to the air on November 20, airing VCY America's Christian radio programming.
