= WNDV-FM =

- South Bend, Indiana; United States
- Broadcast area: Michiana
- Frequency: 92.9 MHz
- Branding: U93

Programming
- Format: Adult CHR
- Affiliations: Premiere Networks

Ownership
- Owner: Artistic Media Partners; (Artistic Media Partners, Inc.)
- Sister stations: WUBU; WZOW-FM

History
- First air date: August 1962
- Former call signs: WNDU-FM (1962–1998)
- Call sign meaning: "Notre Dame University" (disambiguation of former WNDU calls)

Technical information
- Licensing authority: FCC
- Facility ID: 41675
- Class: B
- ERP: 12,000 watts
- HAAT: 268 meters (879 ft)
- Transmitter coordinates: 41°36′20.2″N 86°12′46″W

Links
- Public license information: Public file; LMS
- Webcast: Listen live
- Website: www.u93.com

WNDV-FM (92.9 MHz, "U93") is a radio station broadcasting an Adult Top 40 format. The station serves the South Bend, Indiana, area.

== History ==
The station signed on in August 1962, with the callsign WNDU-FM; it was owned by the University of Notre Dame (from which the call sign was derived), along with WNDU (1490 AM) and WNDU-TV (channel 16). In its early years, WNDU-FM simulcast the programming of its AM counterpart. On July 16, 1971, the station switched to the Drake-Chenault "Hit Parade" format.

The station switched to its current Top 40/CHR format on October 22, 1979, and received its "U93" branding. Throughout the 1980s, the station dominated the Arbitron ratings in the market. Despite having a short CHR battle against WZZP at the time, U93 was South Bend's dominant CHR leader. The station changed its callsign to WNDV-FM, when it was sold by the university on November 23, 1998, to Artistic Media Partners. As of October 2026, Mediabase will shift WNDV's format from Top 40 to Hot AC in March 2027.
