= Artistic Media Partners =

Broadcasting company in Indiana, US

- Industry: Entertainment
- Founded: June 23, 1987; 39 years ago
- Headquarters: Indianapolis, Indiana
- Key people: Arthur A. Angotti (CEO & president)
- Products: Radio
- Website: www.artisticradio.com

Artistic Media Partners (formerly University Broadcasting Company) owns three radio stations in three markets in Indiana. It was formed on June 23, 1987.

== History ==
Founded in 1986 as Broadcast Management Inc. the company owned radio station WXCX-AM-FM in Columbus, Indiana along with WMDH-AM-FM in New Castle, Indiana. For a very short time in the 1990s the company also owned WWKI-FM in Kokomo which sold the group to Wilks Broadcasting. The company changed names in 1987 as University Broadcasting Company when purchasing WAZY-AM-FM. In 1993 University Broadcasting retained the company name in Lafayette and its new market of Bloomington Indiana where they purchased WGCT-FM and WBWB-FM from Oasis Radio while the rest of the company was renamed under the Artistic Media Partners banner. In 1995, the entire company became Artistic Media and the sale of Columbus, Indiana and New Castle, Indiana stations took place.

In 1996 Artistic Media Partners purchased a radio station in Attica Indiana moving it to nearby Lafayette and in 1998 purchased WNDU-AM-FM from Notre Dame and WEZV from Bomar Broadcasting to give them additional properties in South Bend and Lafayette Indiana, respectively. In 2002 Artistic Media Partners purchased radio stations in South Bend and Fort Wayne and continued to grow the company during this time.

When radio station sales became hot again in 2007, Artistic Media Partners sold WBTU-FM along with WSHY-FM to Oasis Radio who still owns both Fort Wayne stations to this day. In October 2016, Artistic Media Partners sells WBPE along with WYCM, WAZY and WSHY to Bill Christian and Mike Reed as part of planned to launch TV station WPBI-LD in Lafayette.

== Stations ==
=== South Bend, Indiana ===
- 92.9 WNDV-FM
- 102.3 WUBU
- 97.7 WZOW-FM
