= Knights of Pythias Building =

Knights of Pythias Building, Knights of Pythias Lodge, Pythias Lodge Building, Knights of Pythias Lodge Hall, or Knights of Pythias Temple may refer to:

- James M. Amoss Building, also known as the Knights of Pythias Building, Wabash, Indiana
- Knights of Pythias Building (Phoenix, Arizona)
- Pythias Lodge Building (San Diego, California)
- Knights of Pythias Lodge Hall (Weiser, Idaho)
- Knights of Pythias Building and Theatre, Greensburg, Indiana
- Knights of Pythias Lodge (South Bend, Indiana)
- Knights of Pythias Temple (Louisville, Kentucky)
- Pythian Opera House, Boothbay Harbor, Maine
- Pythian Temple (New York City)
- Knights of Pythias Building (Virginia City, Nevada)
- Pythian Temple and James Pythian Theater, Columbus, Ohio
- Knights of Pythias Pavilion, Franklin, Tennessee
- Knights of Pythias Temple (Dallas, Texas)
- Knights of Pythias Building (Fort Worth, Texas)
- Pythian Castle (Portsmouth, Virginia)
- Pythian Temple (Tacoma, Washington)

== See also ==
- List of Knights of Pythias buildings
- Pythian Castle (disambiguation)
- Pythian Temple (disambiguation)
- Knights of Pythias Building (disambiguation)
