= List of Knights of Pythias buildings =

This is a list of notable buildings of the Knights of Pythias, a fraternal organization. Many of these are named, primarily or as an alternative, "Pythian Castles", and are built to resemble medieval castles, consistent with the theme of the Pythian order.

in the United States

(by state then city or town)

	Building	Image	Dates	Location	City, State	Description
1	Pythian Temple (Birmingham, Alabama)		1913 built 1980 NRHP-listed	310 18th St. N 33°30′54″N 86°48′37″W	Birmingham, Alabama	Also known as Alabama Penny Savings Bank, which was a major bank serving the black community.
2	Knights of Pythias Building (Phoenix, Arizona)		1928 built 1985 NRHP-listed	829 N. 1st Ave. 33°27′27″N 112°4′27″W	Phoenix, Arizona	Mission Revival architecture
3	Pythian Castle (Arcata, California)		1885 built 1986 NRHP-listed	1100 H St. 40°52′16″N 124°5′6″W	Arcata, California	Queen Anne style
4	Knights of Pythias Building, aka Granger Block			southeast corner of 8th Street and National Avenue in National City	San Diego, California	
5	Pythias Lodge Building (San Diego, California)		1911 built 1981 NRHP-listed	211 E St. and 870 3rd Ave. 32°42′52″N 117°9′41″W	San Diego, California	Beaux Arts in style, demolished to make way for
6	Pythian Building (Middletown, Connecticut)		c.1874 built 1983 NRHP CP-listed	360 Main St. 41°33′45″N 72°38′56″W	Middletown, Connecticut	A contributing property of the NRHP-listed Main Street Historic District (Middletown, Connecticut). Includes Ford News, local landmark
7	Knights of Pythias Lodge Hall (Weiser, Idaho)		1904 built 1976 NRHP-listed	30 E. Idaho St. 44°14′47″N 116°58′5″W	Weiser, Idaho	
8	Knights of Pythias Building and Theatre		1899 built 1978 NRHP-listed	215 N. Broadway; 39°20′17″N 85°29′5″W	Greensburg, Indiana	Early Commercial architecture, Italianate architecture
9	Knights of Pythias / Tyner Building		1900 built ? cp-NRHP-listed	204-210 W. Main St.	Hartford City, Indiana	Included in Hartford City Courthouse Square Historic District. Queen Anne style and other. The Hartford City Times operated from the 210 W. Main address during the early 1900s. For a brief "turbulent" period during the 1920s, the Ku Klux Klan had an office in this building.
10	Knights of Pythias Lodge (South Bend, Indiana)		1922 built 1985 NRHP-listed	224 W. Jefferson; 41°40′29″N 86°15′11″W	South Bend, Indiana	Chicago architecture, Classical Revival architecture
11	Palace Lodge		1892 built 1984 NRHP-listed	Center and Main Sts. 38°22′58″N 87°12′57″W	Winslow, Indiana	Joint project of local Knights of Pythias chapter and Odd Fellows chapter.
12	Knights of Pythias Temple (Louisville, Kentucky)		1914 built 1978 NRHP-listed	928–932 W. Chestnut St. 38°14′58″N 85°46′3″W	Louisville, Kentucky	Building has also served as a YMCA building.
13	Pythian Opera House		1894 built 2008 NRHP-listed	43°51′15″N 69°37′35″W	Boothbay Harbor, Maine	Queen Anne style
14	Pythian Home of Missouri		1913 built 2009 NRHP-listed	1451 E. Pythian Street; 37.2214°N 93.2686°W	Springfield, Missouri	Built in 1913 of "Carthage Stone", a hard limestone from the Ozarks, as an orphanage and retirement home. Commandeered in 1942 for use by the U.S. military, and used as an Enlisted Men's Service Club. Then German and Italian prisoners-of-war were held there, still during World War II. The listing was announced as the featured listing in the National Park Service's weekly list of October 16, 2009. Also known as Pythian Castle
15	Knights of Pythias Building (Virginia City, Nevada)	Knights of Pythias Building	1876 built 1966 NRHP cp-listed	B Street, btwn Union & Sutton Sts.	Virginia City, Nevada	Contributing property in Virginia City Historic District.
16	Pythian Temple (New York City)		1927 built 1986 converted to residential	135 West 70th Street	New York, New York	Built in 1927 to serve as a meeting place for the 120 Pythian lodges of New York City; used in other ways; converted to coop residences in 1986.
17	Pythian Castle (Circleville, Ohio)		???? built	118 N Court St.	Circleville, Ohio	Medieval architecture(?)
18	Pythian Temple and James Pythian Theater		1925 built 1983 NRHP-listed	861-867 Mt. Vernon Ave. 39°58′16″N 82°58′44″W	Columbus, Ohio	Colonial Revival architecture
19	Pythian Castle (Toledo, Ohio)		1890 built 1972 NRHP-listed	801 Jefferson Ave. 41°39′8″N 83°32′25″W	Toledo, Ohio	Romanesque Revival architecture
20	Knights of Pythias Pavilion		1897 built 1988 NRHP-listed	TN 96; 35°55′57″N 86°54′30″W	Franklin, Tennessee	Classical Revival architecture
21	Knights of Pythias Building (Fort Worth, Texas)		1901 built 1970 NRHP-listed; 1981 restored	315 Main St. 32°45′19″N 97°19′52″W	Fort Worth, Texas	Medieval architecture, built on site of 1881 building, the first-built Pythian Castle also known as Pythian Castle Hall
22	Pythian Home		1909 built	1825 E Bankhead Dr. 32.7510851°N 97.7562699°W	Weatherford, Texas	Medieval architecture
23	Pythian Castle (Portsmouth, Virginia)		1897-98 built 1980 NRHP-listed	610-612 Court St. 36°50′1″N 76°18′5″W	Portsmouth, Virginia	Romanesque Revival architecture
24	Pythian Temple (Tacoma, Washington)		1906 built 1985 NRHP-listed	924-926 1/2 Broadway; 47°15′17″N 122°26′23″W	Tacoma, Washington	Late 19th and 20th Century Revivals architecture, Second Renaissance Revival architecture
25	Oregon/Washington Pythian Home		1922 built	3409 Main St; 45°38′47″N 122°40′04″W	Vancouver, Washington	First Pythian Home built West of the Mississippi - Expanded in 1981
26	Pythian Castle Lodge		1927 built 1988 NRHP-listed	1925 W. National Ave. 43°1′21″N 87°56′15″W	Milwaukee, Wisconsin	Mission/Spanish Revival architecture, Spanish Colonial Revival architecture
	Pythian Castle, Baker City, Oregon		1907	1933 1st St; 44°46′37″N 117°49′53″W	Baker City, Oregon	Massing is Romanesque Revival, with medieval crenelation, Tudor arches, pointed arches, and Palladian windows
