= Pythian Castle =

A Pythian Castle was a local meeting place of the Knights of Pythias. It may refer to one of the following (listed alphabetically by U.S. state):

- Pythian Castle (Arcata, California)
- Pythian Home of Missouri, Springfield, Missouri, also known as Pythian Castle
- Pythian Castle (Toledo, Ohio)
- Knights of Pythias Building (Fort Worth, Texas), also known as Pythian Castle Hall
- Pythian Castle (Portsmouth, Virginia)
- Pythian Castle Lodge, Milwaukee, Wisconsin

== See also ==
- List of Knights of Pythias buildings
- Pythian Temple (disambiguation)
- Knights of Pythias Building (disambiguation)
