= Pythian Temple =

Pythian Temple may refer to:

- Pythian Temple (Birmingham, Alabama), also known as Alabama Penny Savings Bank
- Pythian Temple (New York City)
- Pythian Temple and James Pythian Theater Columbus, Ohio
- Pythian Temple (Tacoma, Washington)

== See also ==
- List of Knights of Pythias buildings
- Pythian Castle (disambiguation)
- Knights of Pythias Building (disambiguation)
