= Grace M. Mayer =

American curator of photography (1901–1996)

- Born: November 26, 1901; New York City, U.S.
- Died: December 21, 1996 (aged 95)
- Education: Ethical Culture Fieldston School; Seabury School; Columbia University
- Occupation: Curator

Grace M. Mayer (November 26, 1901 – December 21, 1996) was a curator of photography for the Museum of the City of New York and for the Museum of Modern Art.

== Early life ==
Mayer was born in the Hotel Sevilla, 58th Street, in New York City. Her father was an investment banker and she was privately educated at the Ethical Culture School and the Seabury School, both in New York City. As a teenager she was privately tutored in Europe for two years, and attended one semester at Columbia University. She joined the Red Cross as a nurse's aide during World War I, at Roosevelt Hospital. Despite her wealth, she subsequently sought a career for herself. She was Executive Secretary to Dr. Leo Kessel (1881–1932) at Mount Sinai Hospital where she organized the follow-up clinic for Graves' disease patients, an experience that contributed to her subsequent reputation for conscientiousness and exactitude.

== Museum of the City of New York ==
In 1930 Mayer volunteered at the newly formed Museum of the City of New York, then housed in Gracie Mansion and in 1931 was appointed Curator of Prints there, a position she held until 1959.

Over three decades at the museum she organized about 150 exhibitions, among them Currier & Ives and the New York Scene and We Cover The New Yorker. In 1934 she organized the first important Berenice Abbott show in the United States. Her exhibition of the work of Jacob A. Riis, in 1947, rediscovered the pioneer social documentarian and gained his collection for the museum where it resides alongside more than 10,000 prints and negatives of New York City by the father-son team of Joseph and Percy Byron, taken over half a century, and the Harry T. Peters Collection of Currier & Ives prints.

From the Byron collection she published Once Upon a City, presenting New York at the turn of the century, for which Edward Steichen wrote the foreword. In writing to thank Steichen she asked what she might do to repay him and he responded by asking for her assistance with the Museum of Modern Art's exhibition, 70 Photographers Look at New York which opened in 1957.

== Curator, Museum of Modern Art ==
In 1958 Steichen hired her first as his Special Assistant, then In 1961 as Associate Curator and, in 1962, John Szarkowski appointed her as Curator of the department, organising the inaugural show in MoMA's first photography-collection galleries, which opened in 1964. She collaborated with Steichen on important shows such as The Sense of Abstraction (1960), Steichen the Photographer (1961) for which she wrote the biographical outline, and the introduction to The Bitter Years: 1935-1941 (1962), both published by the Museum of Modern Art.

=== Other exhibitions curated by Mayer ===
- Recent Acquisitions (1961)
- A Bid For Space (4 installations, 1960 to 1963)
- Diogenes with a Camera V (1961)
- Photographs by Harry Callahan and Robert Frank (1962)
- Walker Evans: American Photographs (1962)
- Ernst Haas: Color Photography (1962)

Mayer wrote articles in the Bulletin of the Museum of the City of New York and in Antiques, Contemporary Photographer, Aperture and Audience. She was also responsible for the biographical outline in Steichen the Photographer, a selection of photographs by Steichen (1961).

She was a member of the Advisory Council of the Village Art Center and a director of the Print Council of America.

== Recognition ==
After retiring in 1968 Mayer was appointed curator of the Edward Steichen Archive, a voluntary position. She donated photographs she personally collected to the Museum of Modern Art where they are archived with her written records.

In 1997, the year after she died, Peter Galassi installed From the Grace M. Mayer Collection, at the Museum; a selection of 35 works from the group she left to the museum, mostly of gifts from photographer friends, including Abbott, Steichen, Manuel Alvarez Bravo, Harry Callahan, Paul Caponigro, Roy DeCarava, Jacques-Henri Lartigue, Helen Levitt, Nathan Lyons, Aaron Siskind, W. Eugene Smith, Paul Strand, Todd Webb and Minor White, as well as lithographs by Toulouse-Lautrec.

== Bibliography ==
- Grace M. Mayer (1961) "Biographical outline" in Steichen the Photographer (texts by Carl Sandburg, Alexander Lieberman, Edward Steichen, and Rene d'Harnoncourt), New York: Museum of Modern Art.
- Grace M. Mayer, "Afterword". In Millstein, Barbara Head & Lowe, Sarah M & Brooklyn Museum (1992). Consuelo Kanaga: an American photographer. Brooklyn Museum in association with University of Washington Press, Brooklyn (New York, NY)
