= Nashville Arcade =

- U.S. National Register of Historic Places
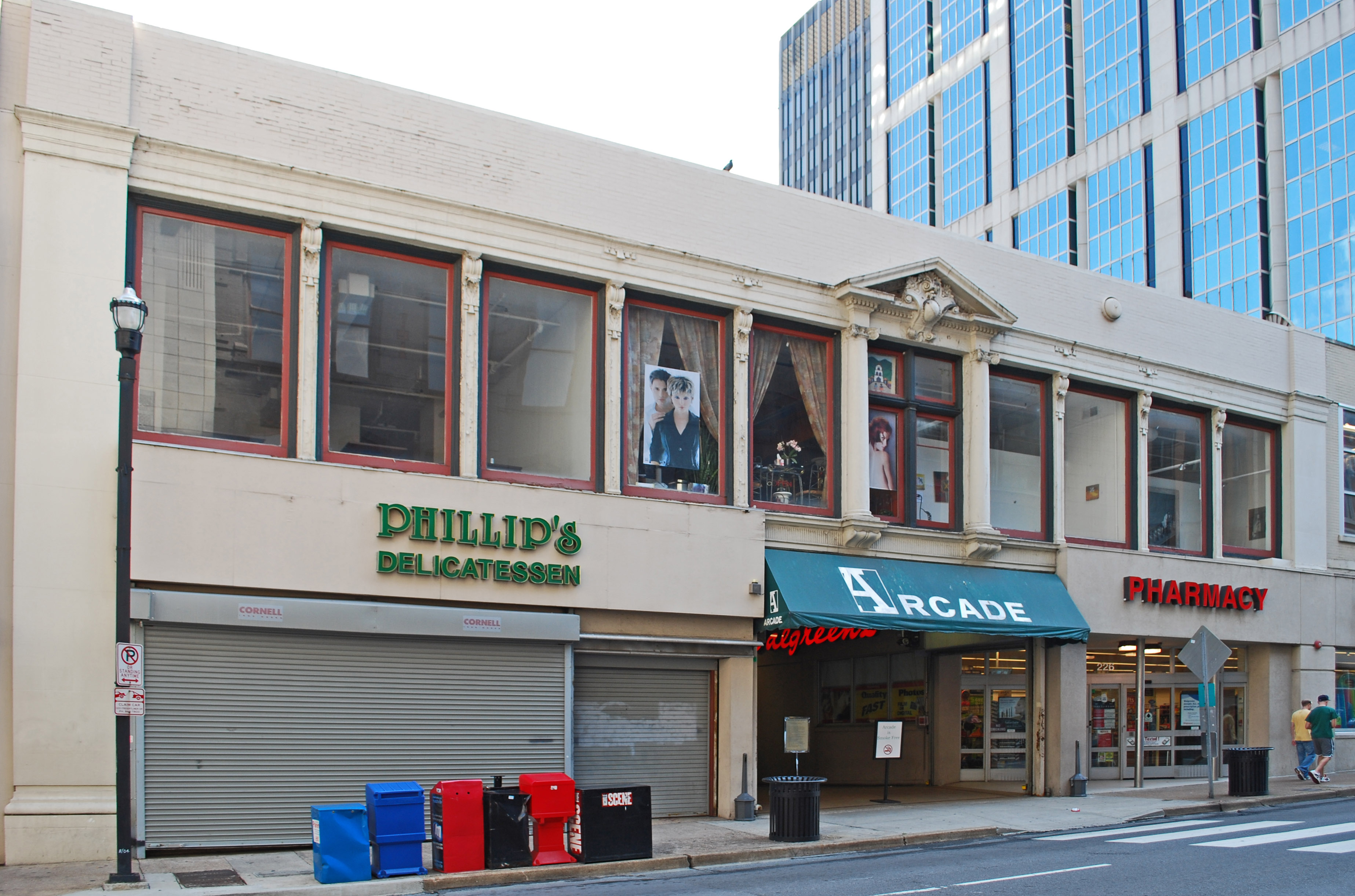
- 5th Avenue facade

- Location within Tennessee Location within the United States
- Location: Between 4th and 5th Aves., Nashville, Tennessee
- Coordinates: 36°9′51″N 86°46′48″W
- Area: 5 acres (2.0 ha)
- Built: 1902
- Architect: Edgefield & Nashville Co.
- NRHP reference No.: 73001761
- Added to NRHP: May 22, 1973

The Arcade is a covered shopping arcade in downtown Nashville, Tennessee, U.S.. It was built in 1902.

== History ==
The arcade was developed by Daniel Franklin Carter Buntin and constructed by the Edgefield and Nashville Manufacturing Company. It was Nashville's first shopping center, replacing the former Overton Alley. Located between Fourth and Fifth avenues,

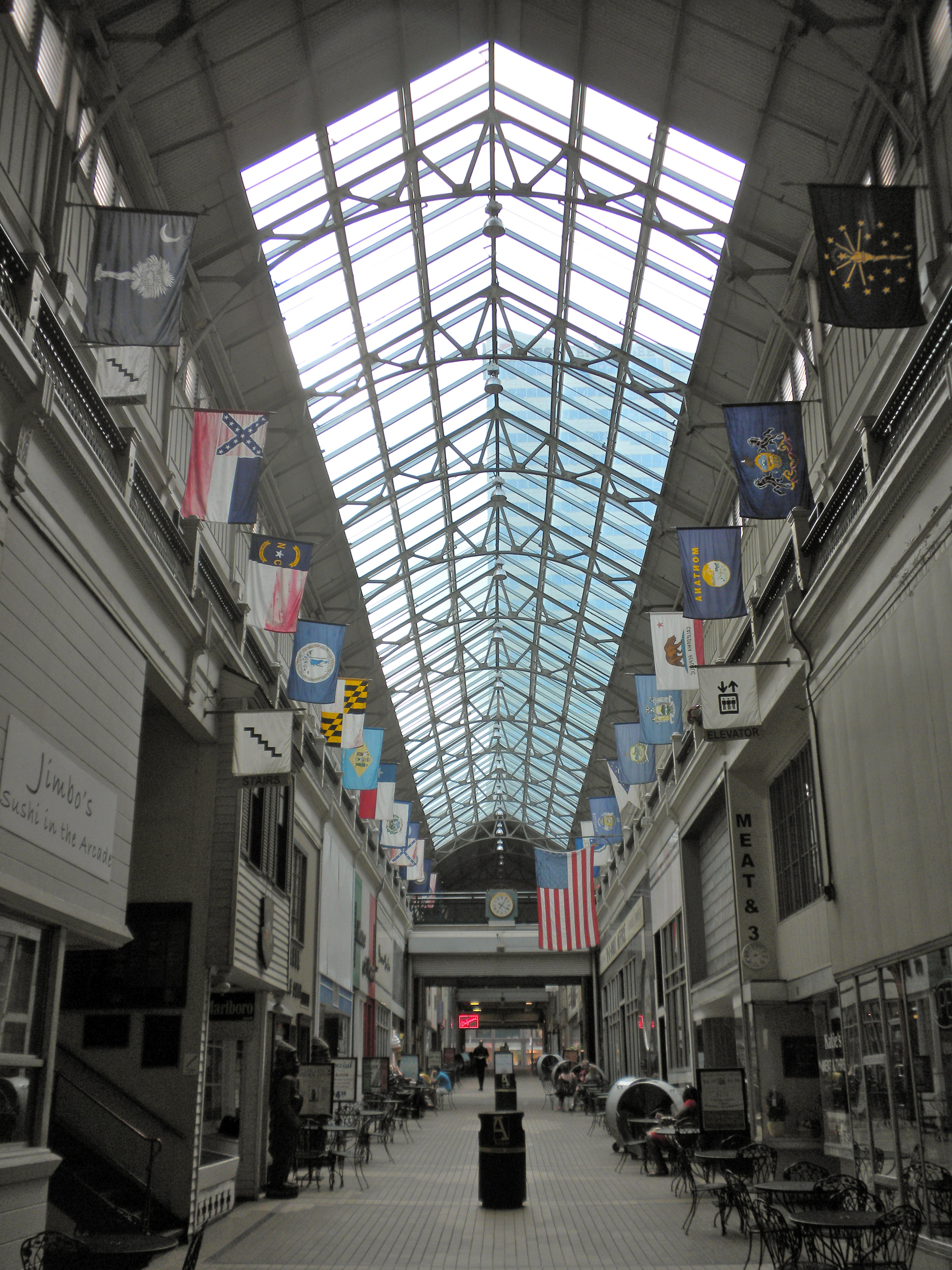
Interior view facing west toward 5th Avenue

The Arcade is at the center of the downtown Nashville Arts District and houses an arts community.

== Architectural design ==
The arcade was designed by Thompson, Gibel, and Asmus. It was modeled after an arcade in Italy. The entrances consist of identical Palladian facades. It has been listed on the National Register of Historic Places since May 22, 1973.
