= Third Baptist Church (Nashville, Tennessee) =

Historic church in Tennessee, United States

- U.S. National Register of Historic Places
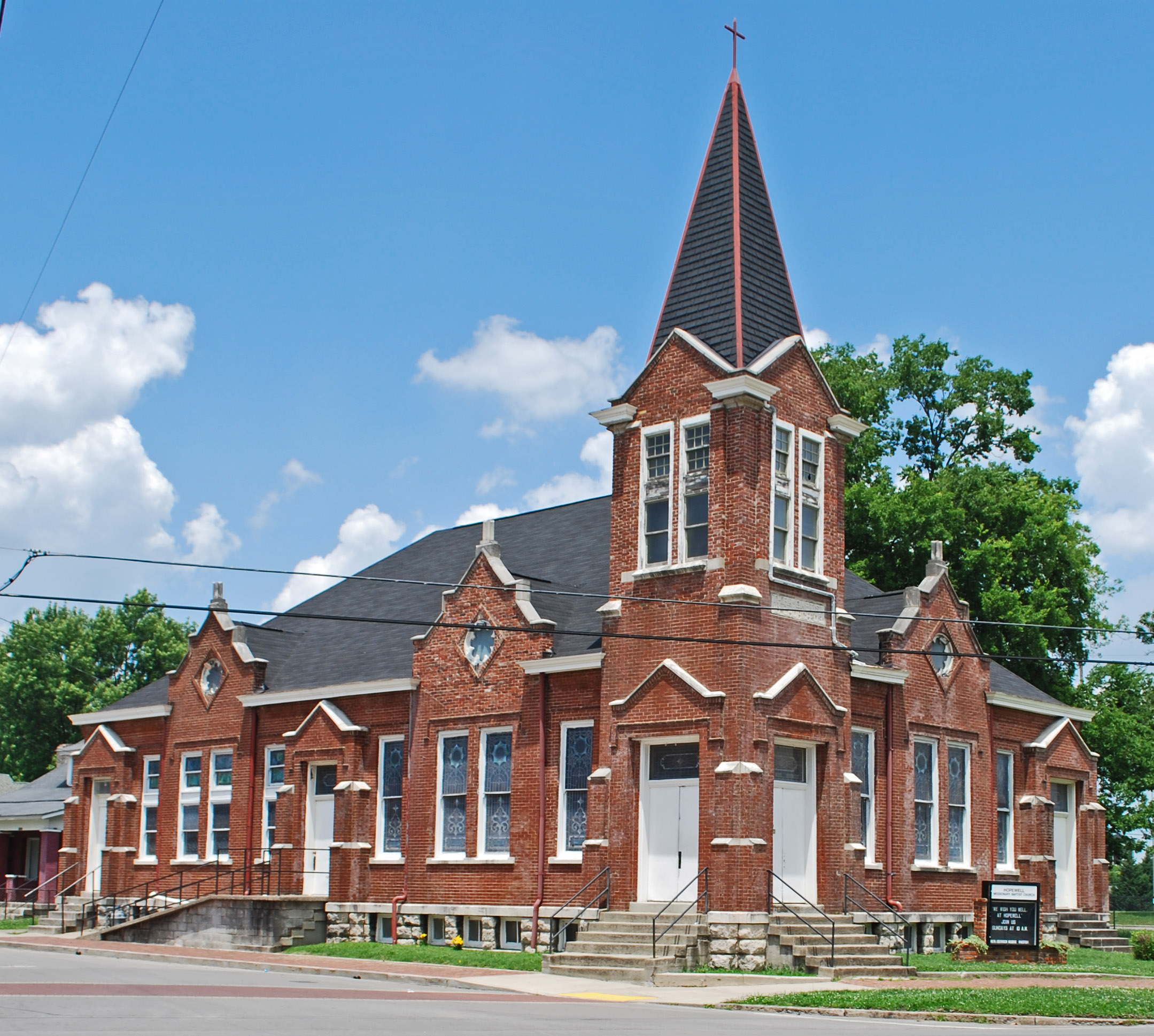

- Location within Tennessee Location within the United States
- Location: 906 and 908 Monroe St., Nashville, Tennessee
- Coordinates: 36°10′30″N 86°47′43″W
- Area: 0.2 acres (0.081 ha)
- Architect: Henry Gibel
- NRHP reference No.: 79002427
- Added to NRHP: October 31, 1979

The Third Baptist Church in Nashville, Tennessee, which has also been known as Hopewell Missionary Baptist Church and Parsonage, is a historic church at 906 and 908 Monroe Street.

It was added to the National Register of Historic Places in 1979.

It was designed by Swiss-born architect Henry Gibel (1859-1906).
