= Fourth Avenue Historic District (Birmingham, Alabama) =

Historic district in Alabama, United States

- U.S. National Register of Historic Places
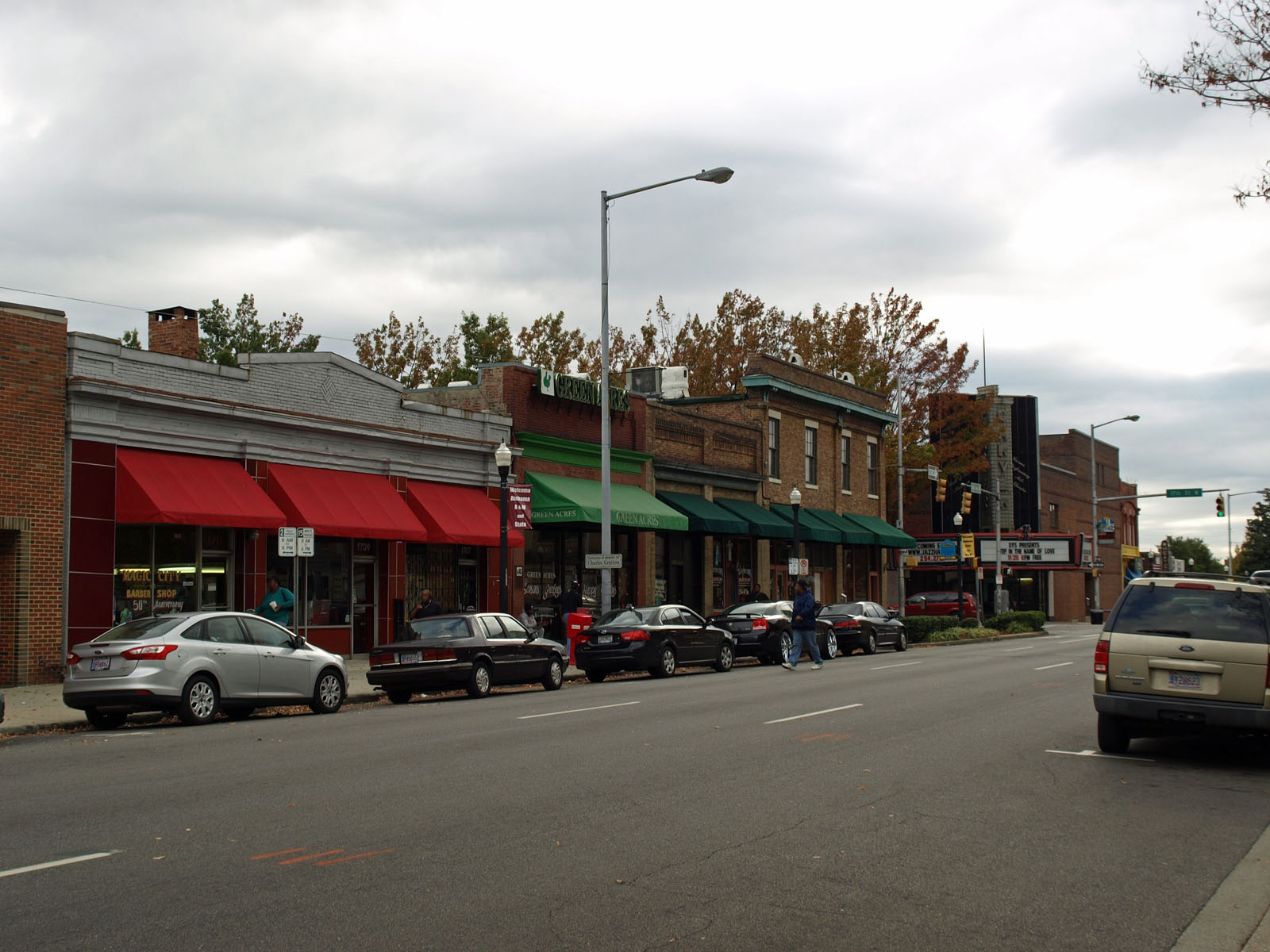

- Location within Alabama
- Location: 1600–1800 blks of 4th Ave. N and part of the 300 blks of 17th and 18th Sts. N, Birmingham, Alabama
- Area: 4.2 acres (1.7 ha)
- Built: 1922
- Architect: Taylor, Robert R., Persley, Louis H., Woods, Walter T.
- Architectural style: Art Deco, Victorian commercial
- NRHP reference No.: 82002041
- Added to NRHP: February 11, 1982

The Fourth Avenue Historic District in Birmingham, Alabama was listed on the National Register of Historic Places in 1982. The listing included 17 contributing buildings on 4.2 acres (1.7 ha). It includes the 1600–1800 blocks of 4th Ave., N. and part of the 300 blocks of 17th and 18th Sts., N.

== History ==
Colored Masonic Temple

One reason that it was deemed significant is that the district "is the only place left in the city which tells the story of the Jim Crow years in Birmingham (1908–1941). Prohibited from patronizing white restaurants, movie theaters, and personal service establishments, blacks developed businesses in those areas to serve their community. They also offered professional services (medical and legal) to the black community. Although now somewhat diminished by the demolition of some structures and the dispersal of black life that has come with integration and suburban expansion, important structures remain which document what was once the center of commercial activity in black Birmingham."

It includes works by architects Robert R. Taylor, Louis H. Persley, Walter T. Woods and others. The area features Art Deco architecture and commercial Victorian architecture.

It includes:

- Alabama Penny Savings Bank, (or Pythian Temple), which was already separately listed on the National Register.
- Colored Masonic Temple (1922; or 'Most Worshipful Prince Hall Grand Lodge'), a seven-story building
