= Seabury School =

Coordinates: 47°18′18″N 122°25′23″W

- Formation: 1989
- Type: Non-profit organization
- Purpose: Gifted education
- Location: Tacoma, Washington
- Head of School: Sandi Wollum
- Website: Seabury.org

Seabury School is an independent school for gifted children in Tacoma, Washington.

Founded in 1989, Seabury is the only independent school in the South Puget Sound marketed towards intellectually advanced children. Seabury is a member of the Pacific Northwest Association of Independent Schools (PNAIS) and the Northwest Association of Schools and Colleges (NASC).

Seabury serves students from pre-kindergarten through eighth grades on two campuses: pre-k to fifth in Northeast Tacoma (Browns Point), and six to eighth in downtown Tacoma. For the 2024-2025 school year, the middle school was relocated to the lower school campus for financial reasons, although the school still owns the building.

== History ==
In 1988, Barbara Field and Lee Woodworth Fisher founded the school with grades kindergarten through second and with plans for inclusion through grade six. After accumulating used furniture, materials and books, Field and Fisher rented a commercially zoned building on 51st Street NE near Commencement Bay in Northeast Tacoma.

In September 1989, Seabury School opened with eighteen students, two teachers and parent volunteer aides. By September 1990, Seabury had 38 students, a director, three teachers, three aides, a set of bylaws and an ever-expanding set of policies. In 1992, the school was accepted as a candidate member of the Pacific Northwest Association of Independent Schools.

In the fall of 1993, enrollment had expanded so Seabury offered a full academic program of classes for students in preschool through grade six, including French language instruction. In 2009, Seabury opened a middle school for gifted students in grades 6-8 in downtown Tacoma. Seabury buses its students between the sites.

== Lower School ==
Seabury's Lower School is located in its original location in Northeast Tacoma, and houses pre-kindergarten through fifth grades. The campus has expanded to include administrative offices, a Media Center and library and expanded outdoor play space.

In fall 2010, the Early Learning Center at Seabury School changed from a preschool and kindergarten program to a 4-year-old pre-kindergarten and kindergarten program.

== Middle school ==
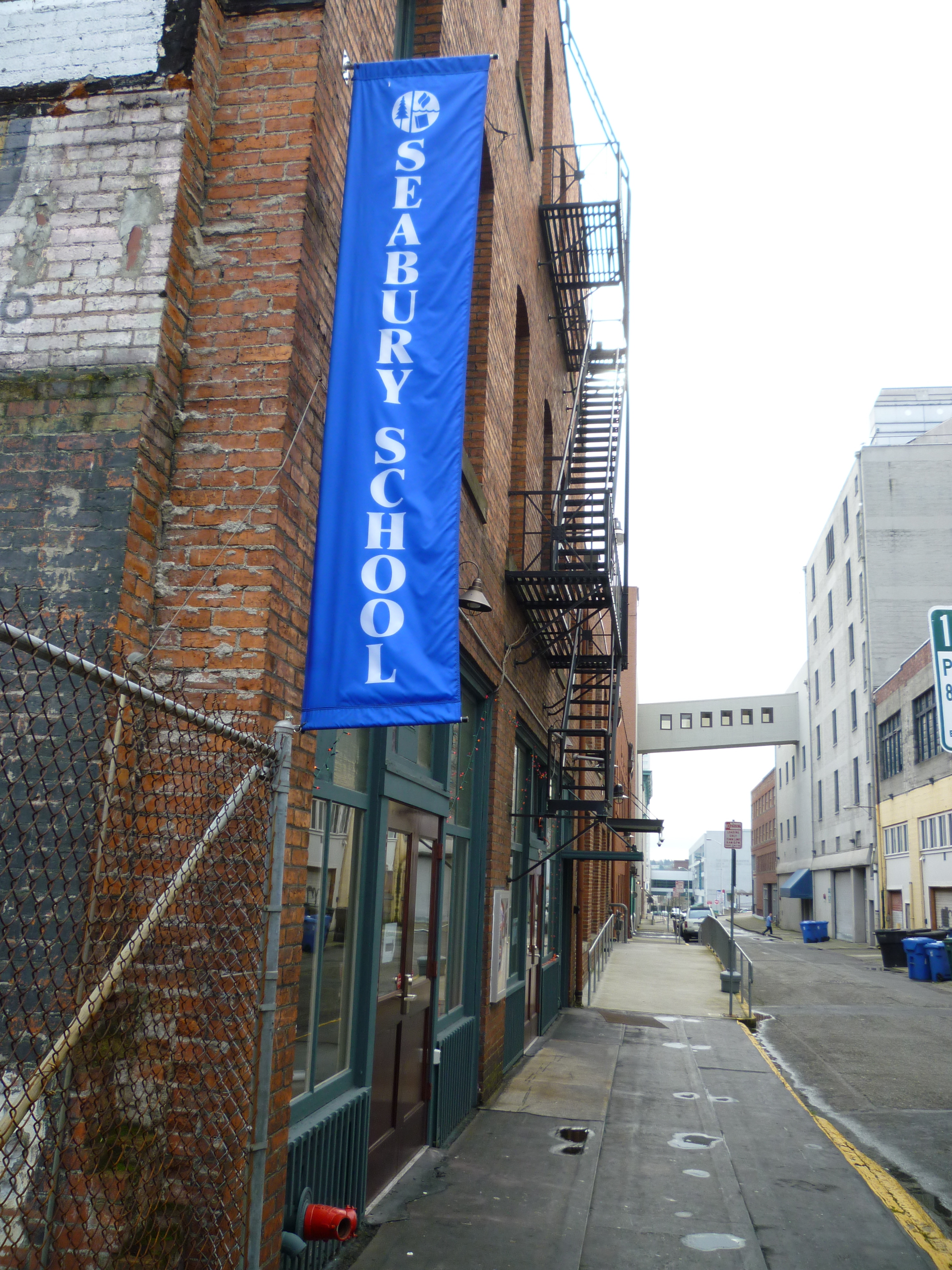
Outside of Seabury Middle School, Tacoma, Washington.

Seabury's Middle School opened in September 2009, and was located in Tacoma's downtown Theatre District. The middle school houses sixth, seventh and eighth grades.

The Seabury Middle School program features an integrated curriculum and is designed so that students make the city their classroom. Students take physical education classes at the downtown Tacoma YMCA, do research at the Tacoma Public Library, visit the Tacoma Farmers Market and eat lunch at local delis and cafés.

The school was housed in the Pythian Temple downtown. As of the 2024-2025 school year, the middle school students have been relocated to the lower school campus.
