= Henry Gibel =

American architect

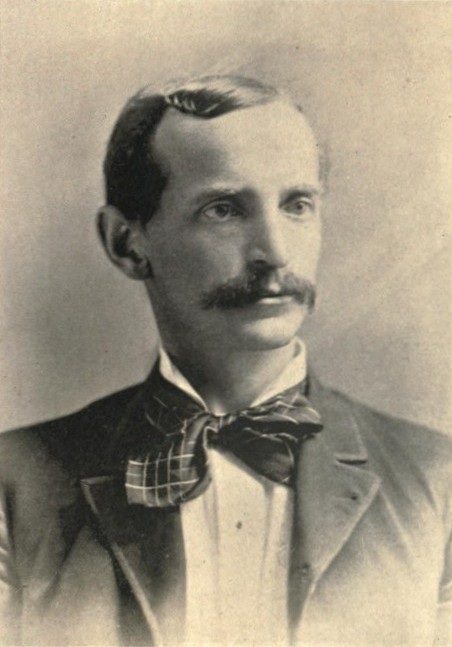
- Born: June 1858; Zürich, Switzerland
- Died: August 23, 1906 (aged 48); Nashville, Tennessee, U.S.
- Resting place: Mount Olivet Cemetery
- Education: Polytechnic School, Zurich
- Occupation: Architect
- Spouse: Louise Jeck
- Children: 3 daughters

Henry Gibel (June 1858 – August 23, 1906) was a Swiss-born American architect. He designed many buildings in Tennessee, some of which are listed on the National Register of Historic Places.

== Early life ==
Henry Gibel was born in Zürich, Switzerland. He graduated from the Polytechnic School, Zurich. He emigrated to the United States, settling in Nashville in the 1880s.

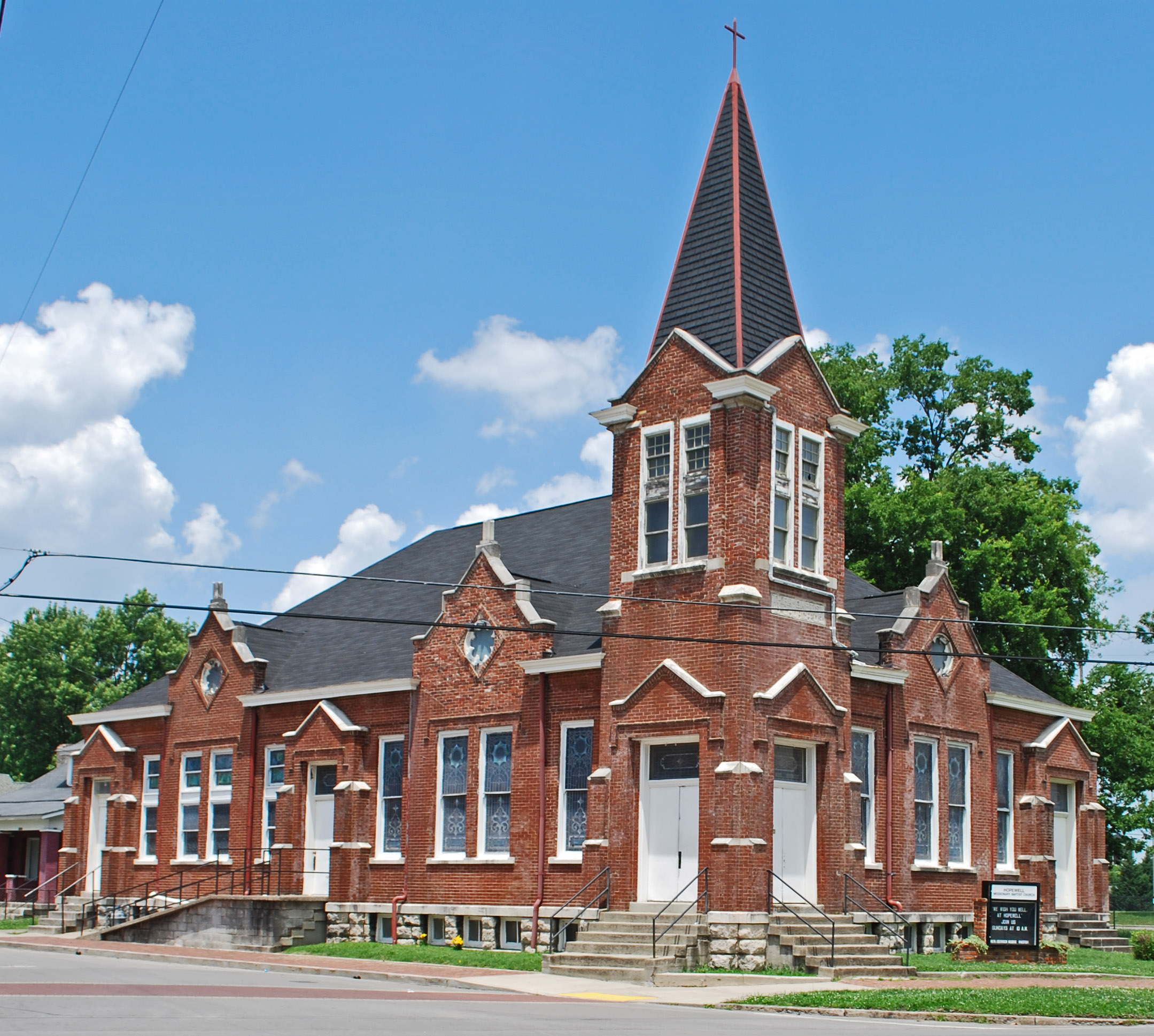
The Third Baptist Church in Nashville, designed by Gibel.

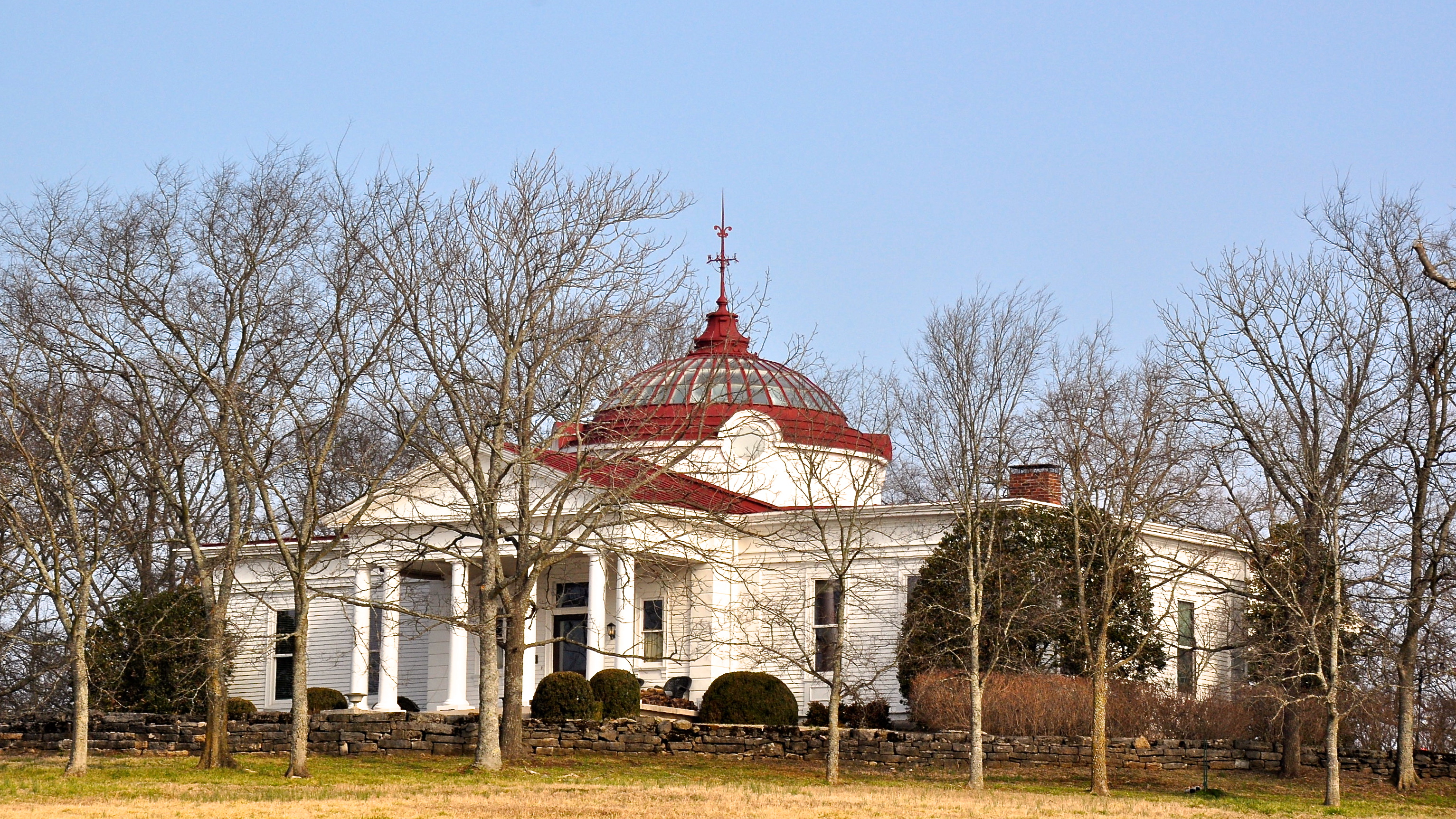
The Knights of Pythias Pavilion in Franklin, designed by Gibel.

== Career ==
Gibel became an architect in Tennessee. He designed churches in North Nashville, including the Second Presbyterian Church on the corner of 9th and Monroe Streets, or the Third Baptist Church, at 906 and 908 Monroe St. in Nashville, Tennessee, which is listed on the National Register of Historic Places. He also designed houses like the one on the corner of Monroe Street and Arthur Avenue. In Franklin, he designed the Knights of Pythias Pavilion, which is listed on the National Register of Historic Places.

As a partner in the architectural firm Thompson, Gibel, and Asmus, Gibel designed the Mitchell House in Lebanon, Tennessee. They also designed the Nashville Arcade, the American National Bank Building, and the Gray & Dudley Hardware Company Building in Nashville.

Gibel advertised his services in the Confederate Veteran.

== Personal life and death ==
On May 26, 1887, Gibel married Louise Jeck, who was born in Hessen, Germany and moved to Nashville at 18. They had three daughters, and they resided at 1215 7th Avenue, North in Nashville, Tennessee.

Gibel died on August 23, 1906. His funeral was held at the German Methodist Episcopal Church, and he was buried in Mount Olivet Cemetery. His widow died in 1949.
