= Alabama Penny Savings Bank =

- U.S. National Register of Historic Places
- U.S. Historic district – Contributing property
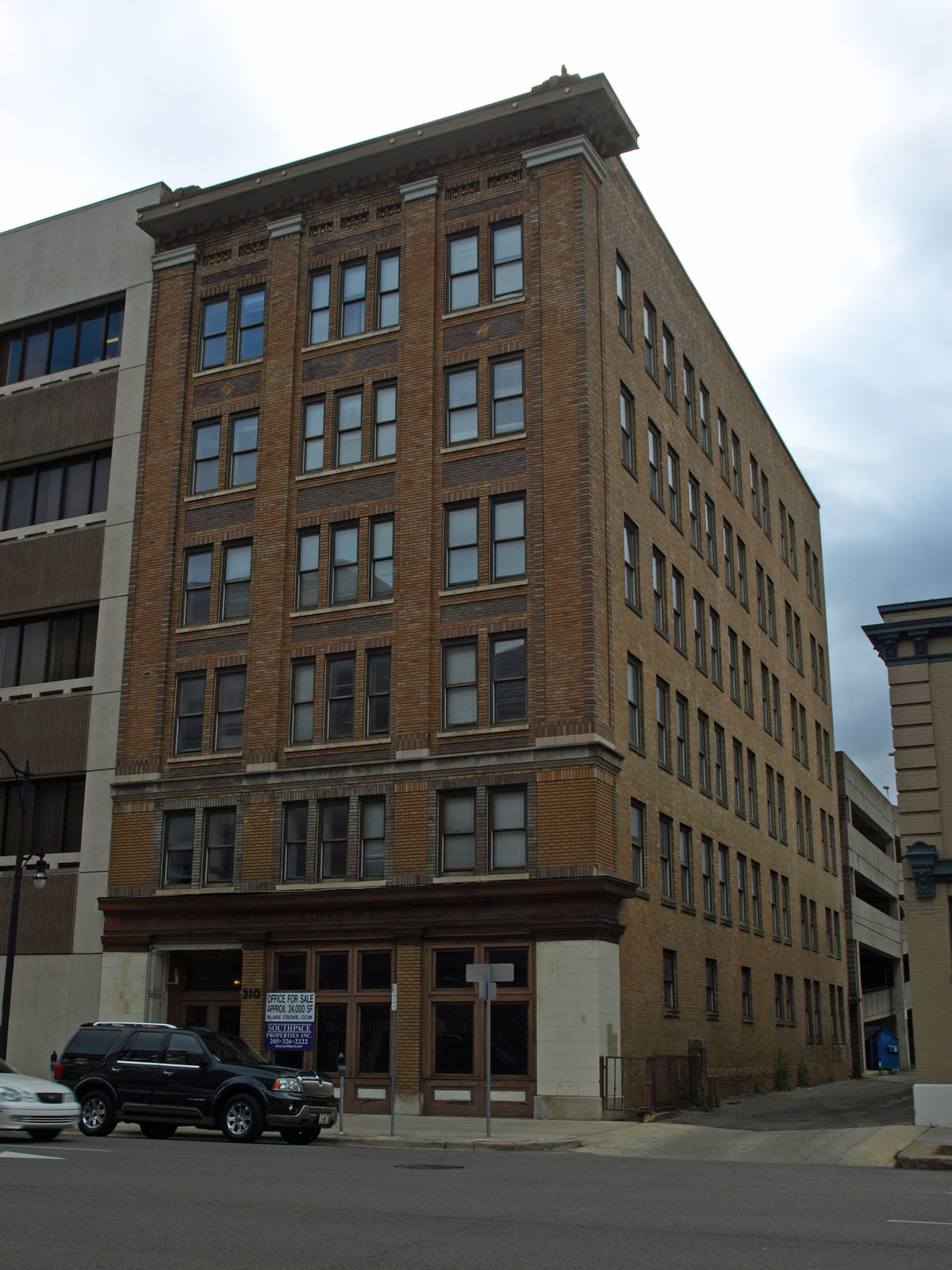

- Location within Alabama
- Location: 310 18th St. N, Birmingham, Alabama
- Coordinates: 33°30′54″N 86°48′37″W
- Area: less than one acre
- Built: 1913
- Built by: Windham Construction Co.
- Architect: Wallace A. Rayfield
- Architectural style: Commercial style
- Part of: Fourth Avenue Historic District (ID82002041)
- NRHP reference No.: 80004471

Significant dates
- Added to NRHP: March 10, 1980
- Designated CP: February 11, 1982

The Alabama Penny Savings Bank is a historic building built in 1913 at 310 18th Street North in Birmingham, Alabama, United States. The building has also been known as the Pythian Temple. Alabama Penny Savings Bank was the first black-owned bank in Alabama and financed construction of homes and churches for thousands of local black citizens. The bank was founded in 1890 and was the second largest black bank in the United States in 1907. The building was listed on the National Register of Historic Places in 1980.

== History ==
Alabama Penny Savings Bank was founded by William Reuben Pettiford in 1890. Branches of the bank were established in Selma, Anniston, and Montgomery. After Pettiford's death the bank merged and then closed in 1915.

Victor Tulane and William J. Robinson ran the Montgomery branch. Robinson was also general manager of The Emancipator newspaper.

== Architecture ==
The bank building is a six-story Commercial style building with a buff-colored brick exterior. "It has a strong vertical appearance, emphasized by its proportions and the unbroken rise of four vertical piers." It has a projecting cornice.

The building is significant as "a distinctive local example of 1910s office building design". It was built by a local black construction company and may have been designed by Black architect Wallace A. Rayfield, who designed many other buildings for the black community in Birmingham.

It is also a contributing building in the Fourth Avenue Historic District.

== See also ==
- List of Knights of Pythias buildings
- National Register of Historic Places listings in Birmingham, Alabama
