= Northeast Tacoma, Tacoma, Washington =

Coordinates: 47°16′51″N 122°22′46″W

Northeast Tacoma is a neighborhood in Tacoma, Washington. The generally accepted borders of Northeast Tacoma are the Port of Tacoma to the southwest, the unincorporated Fife Heights area to the southeast, the end of incorporated Tacoma at the Browns Point border to the northwest, and the King County border to the northeast. Its nearly 17,000 residents — roughly one in 12 Tacomans — are severed from the rest of the city by the shipyards, container cranes and grit of the Port of Tacoma.

Due to the separation from the main part of the city by the Port of Tacoma area, Northeast Tacoma is the most suburban and isolated neighborhood of Tacoma. Many homes in the area have views, partially owing to the hilly terrain. Indian Hill is, at 530 feet above sea level, the highest point in incorporated Tacoma. On city maps, Northeast Tacoma is everything within city limits on the east side of Commencement Bay above the Tideflats. Farther north, Browns Point and its historic lighthouse, and Dash Point and its park and pier, are both distinct places with distinct characters, indistinctly identified as unincorporated Pierce County.

The children that live in Northeast Tacoma generally attend one of the three public elementary schools (Northeast Elementary, Browns Point Elementary, or Crescent Heights Elementary). All three of the elementary schools feed into Northeast Tacoma's Jerry Meeker Middle School. With the completion of middle school, Northeast Tacoma residents typically attend Stadium High School. Some students choose to attend Federal Way schools, such as Decatur High School.

The median Northeast Tacoma household income is about $83,000, just over the North End, at $77,000, and well above Tacoma average, at $51,000. Both areas have much higher housing prices than the Tacoma average, lower poverty, and are more ethnically homogeneous.

== Sources ==
- Abe, Debby (January 17, 1999). "Boundary Lines Drawn for Northeast Tacoma Schools (part 1)". The News Tribune. p. B1.
- Abe, Debby (January 17, 1999). "Boundary Lines Drawn for Northeast Tacoma Schools (part 2)". The News Tribune. p. B3.
- Gordon, Susan (September 13, 1987). "Northeast Tacoma Builds a Missing Link". The News Tribune. p. H1.
- Suttle, Gestin (January 12, 1997). "N. E. Tacoma: Separate and Unequal?". The News Tribune. p. 5.
