= Pythian Castle (Arcata, California) =

- U.S. National Register of Historic Places
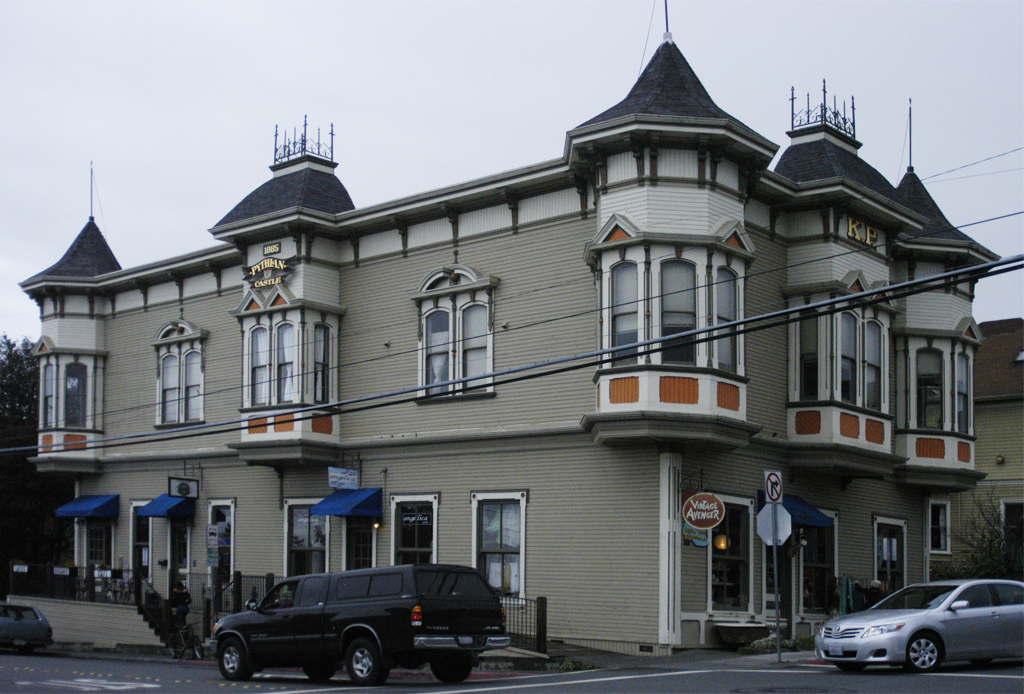
- The Pythian Castle was built by the Knights of Pythias

- Location within California Location within the United States
- Location: 1100 H St., Arcata, California
- Coordinates: 40°52′14.89″N 124°05′11.13″W
- Area: 0.2 acres (0.081 ha)
- Built: 1884-85
- Architect: Glidden, A.P.
- Architectural style: Queen Anne
- NRHP reference No.: 86000263
- Added to NRHP: February 20, 1986

The Pythian Castle is a building in Arcata, northwestern California, that was built during 1884-85 for the North Star chapter of the Knights of Pythias fraternal order. It is notable for its commercial Queen Anne style architecture which features five projecting towers: two square towers projecting from the center of the two street-fronting sides of the building, and three round towers projecting from the street-side corners. Patterned shingles covered the tower roofs in the past. The corner ones have "witch hat"-shaped tops and used to sport tall finials. The side ones once had cresting.

It was listed on the National Register of Historic Places in 1986. Although many of its details have changed, the building was deemed significant as the "only remaining Victorian commercial building [in Arcata], that has not lost its architectural and historic character."

== See also ==
- List of Knights of Pythias buildings
- Odd Fellows Hall (Eureka, California) — another historic lodge in Humboldt County.
- National Register of Historic Places listings in Humboldt County, California
