= Knights of Pythias Lodge Hall (Weiser, Idaho) =

- U.S. National Register of Historic Places
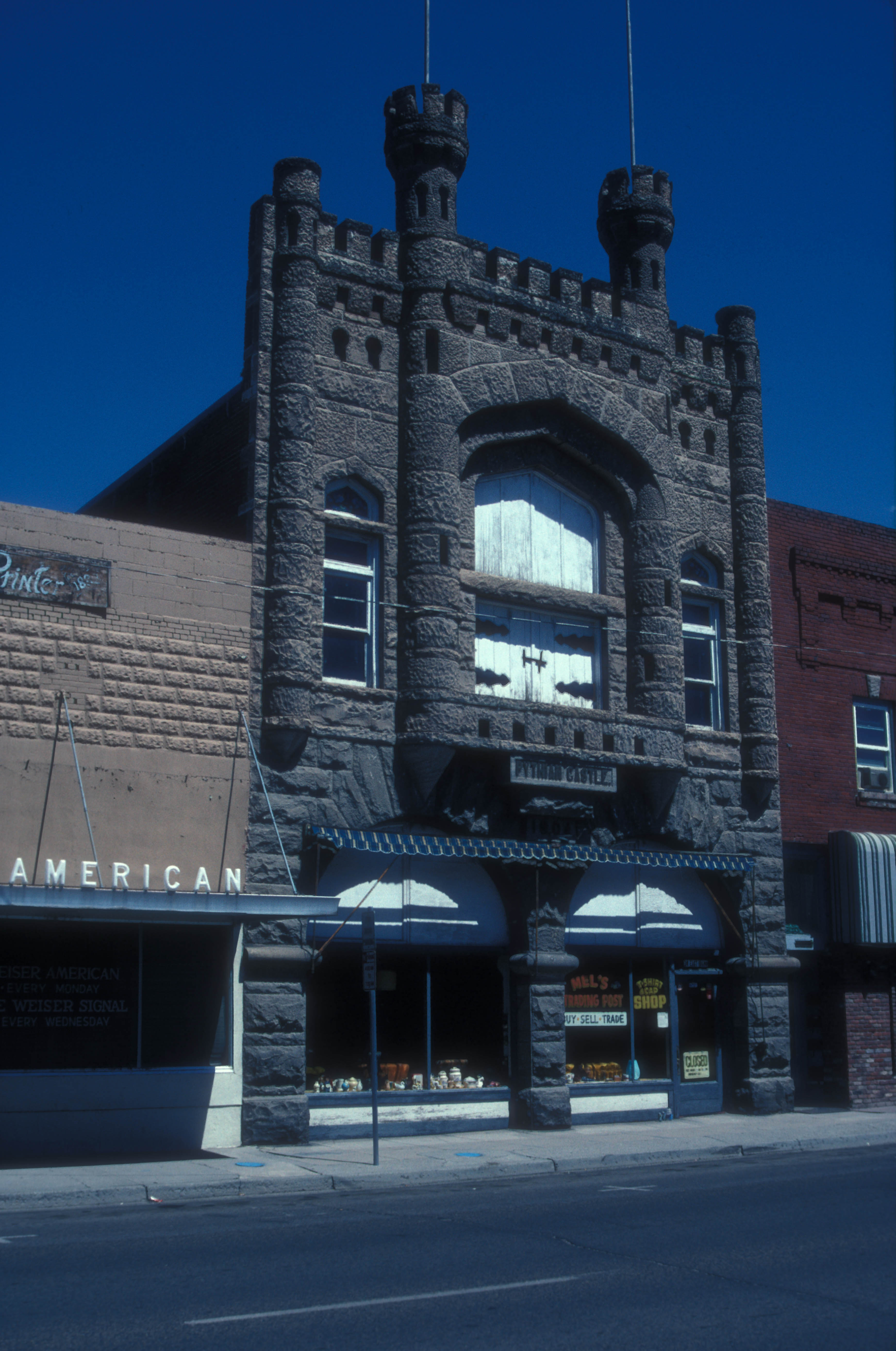

- Location within Idaho Location within the United States
- Location: 30 E. Idaho St., Weiser, Idaho
- Coordinates: 44°14′44″N 116°58′11″W
- Area: less than one acre
- Built: 1904
- Architect: Tourtellotte & Co.
- NRHP reference No.: 76000683
- Added to NRHP: May 13, 1976

The Knights of Pythias Lodge Hall, also known as Pythian Castle, in Weiser, Idaho is a building built in 1904. It was listed on the National Register of Historic Places in 1976.

== History ==
The Pythian Castle was originally owned and commissioned by the Knights of Pythias, an international, non-sectarian fraternal order, established in 1864. The building was designed by Boise, Idaho architectural firm Tourtellotte & Hummel. The cut stone for the front was supplied by Roberts and Sheff and quarried at Sand Hollow, near Weiser. The masonry work was completed by Hamilton and Reader Masonries of Weiser, Idaho.

In 1982, the building came into ownership of the Weiser Architectural Preservation Committee and remains as a historical monument in the city of Weiser, Idaho.

== Construction and features ==
Each stone was transferred to the site and hand cut to fit. The symmetrical cut-stone structure faces south. Two plate-glass windows make up the first floor, with a glass door at the eastern corner. Three cut-stone columns break up the first story's facade and culminate in Romanesque arches over the plate glass windows. A stone band separates the first and second stories. A large, centered window, originally stained glass but now boarded over, dominates the second story. It has a corbelled Tudor arch and is flanked by two double-hung sash windows with small stained glass transoms, also capped by Tudor arches. Four cylindrical pilasters extend the length of the second story. The two interior pilasters extend the length of the second story. The two interior pilasters are wider and terminate as miniature towers with flagstaffs. The entire building is surmounted by crenellated battlements.
