= Knights of Pythias Pavilion =

- U.S. National Register of Historic Places
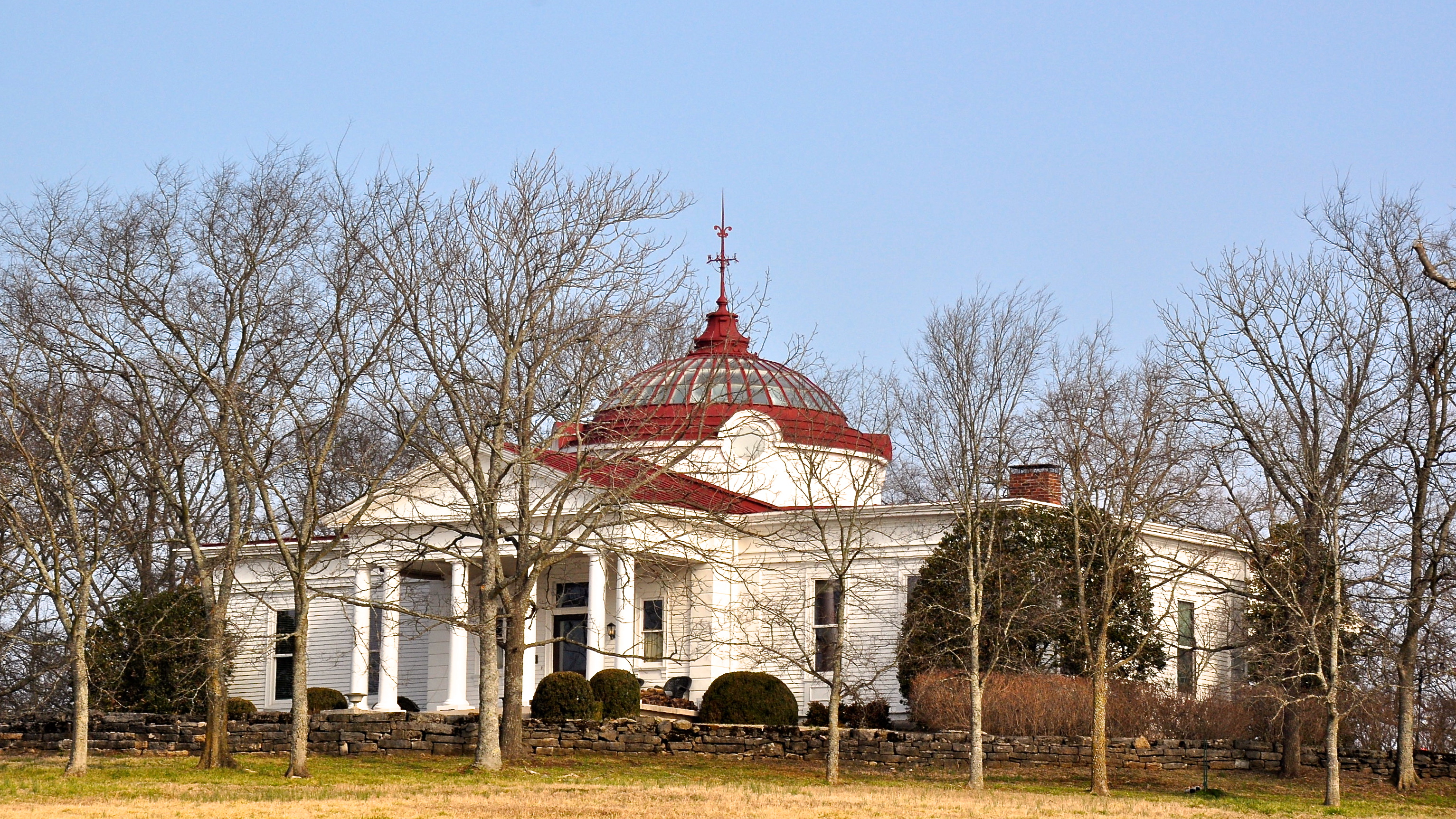
- Knights of Pythias Pavilion, March 2014.

- Location within Tennessee Location within the United States
- Location: TN 96, Franklin, Tennessee
- Coordinates: 35°55′57″N 86°54′30″W
- Area: 3.7 acres (1.5 ha)
- Built: 1897
- Architect: Gibel, Henry
- Architectural style: Classical Revival
- MPS: Williamson County MRA
- NRHP reference No.: 88000292
- Added to NRHP: April 14, 1988

The Knights of Pythias Pavilion in Franklin, Tennessee, also known as Carlisle House, is a Classical Revival architecture building designed by Henry Gibel and built in 1897. It was listed on the National Register of Historic Places in 1988.

According to a 1988 study of Williamson County historical resources, conducted by staff of the Tennessee Historical Commission:

An unusual addition to the county's architecture in the 1890s was the Knights of Pythias Pavilion which was moved to a hill west of Franklin (WM-996). The pavilion was originally located on the grounds of the Tennessee Centennial Exposition in Nashville which was held in 1897. It was purchased after the exposition and moved by wagon to its present location off Highway 96. The building is of Neo-Classical design and features a prominent red dome. (page 31)

Later the same study describes again:

One of the most significant frame residences in the county is the Knights of Pythias Pavilion (WM-996) which was originally constructed in Nashville for the 1897 Centennial Exposition. The pavilion was part of the Centennial complex and after the Exposition came to an end it was purchased and moved to Williamson County. The house has Colonial Revival detailing and a prominent central projecting dome. The house has not been altered and is one of the most unusual designs in the county. (page 43)
