= Pythias Lodge Building (San Diego) =

- U.S. National Register of Historic Places
- San Diego Historic Landmark
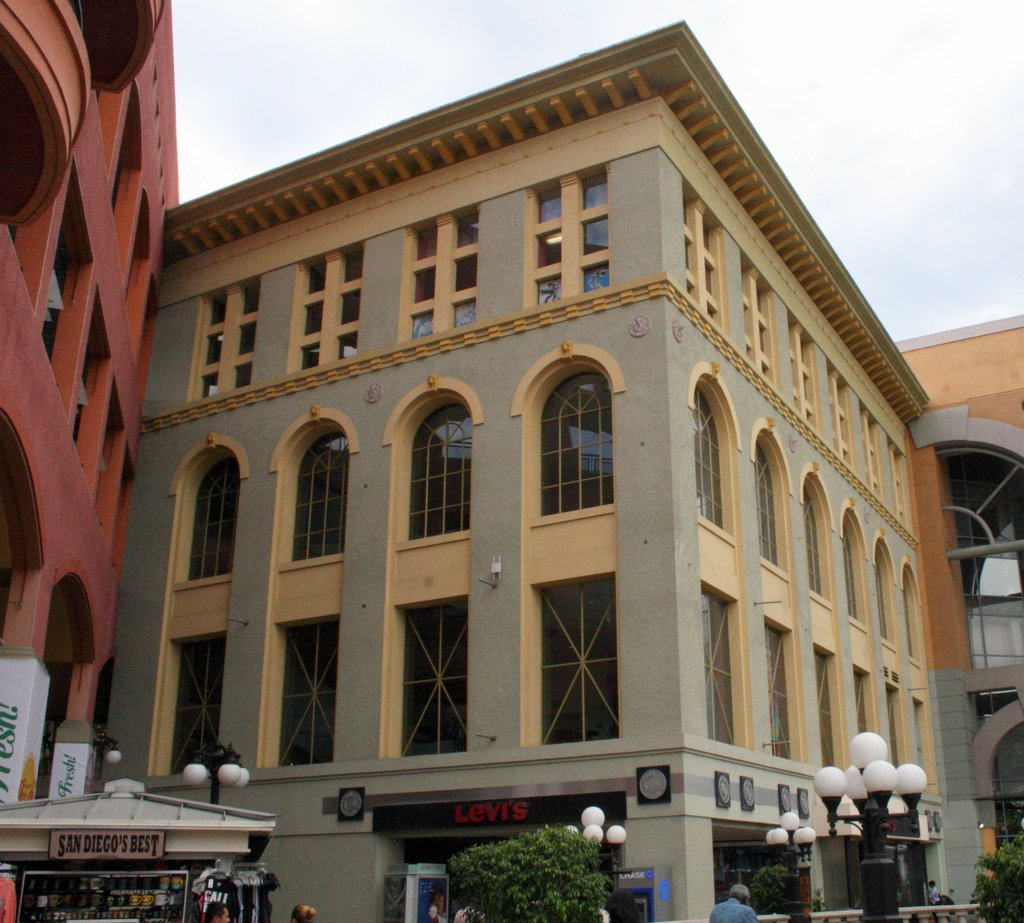

- Location within San Diego Location within San Diego County, California Location within California Location within the United States
- Location: 211 E St. and 870 3rd Ave., San Diego, California
- Coordinates: 32°42′52″N 117°9′43.5″W
- Area: 0.1 acres (0.040 ha)
- Built: 1911
- Architect: Quayle, Charles; Quayle, Edward
- Architectural style: Beaux Arts
- NRHP reference No.: 81000171
- SDHL No.: 144

Significant dates
- Added to NRHP: April 8, 1981
- Designated SDHL: April 8, 1980

The Pythias Lodge Building in San Diego, California, also known as Community Arts Complex or Intercultural Council of the Arts, is a Beaux Arts architecture building built in 1911.

It was designated a San Diego Historical Landmark in 1980, and it was listed on the National Register of Historic Places in 1981.

However, the building was demolished during the construction of the Westfield Horton Plaza. The mall includes a replica of its facade.
