= Opera House at Boothbay Harbor =

- Pythian Opera House; Opera House at Boothbay Harbor
- U.S. National Register of Historic Places
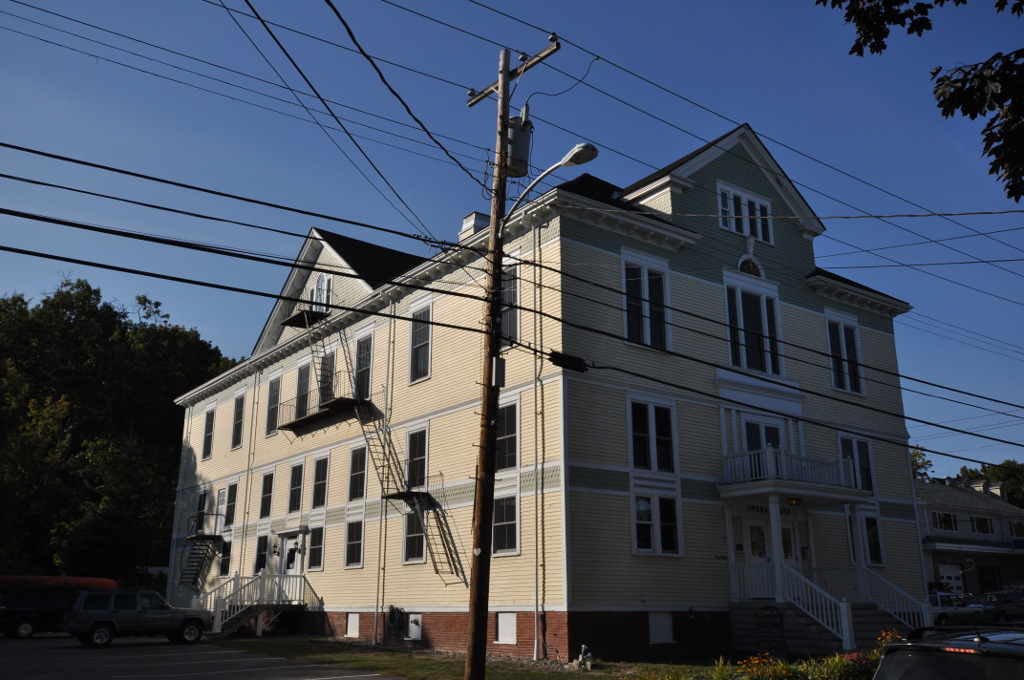

- Location within Maine
- Location: 86 Townsend Ave., Boothbay Harbor, Maine
- Coordinates: 43°51′15″N 69°37′35″W
- Area: 0.45 acres (0.18 ha)
- Built: 1894
- Architect: Francis H. Fassett and Edward F. Fassett
- Architectural style: Queen Anne
- NRHP reference No.: 08001256
- Added to NRHP: December 30, 2008

The Opera House at Boothbay Harbor, also known historically as the Boothbay Harbor Opera House, Knights of Pythias Hall, the Opera House, and as the Pythian Opera House, is a historic meeting hall and multifunction building at 86 Townsend Avenue in Boothbay Harbor, Maine. Built in 1894, it has housed government offices of the town, and the meeting spaces of fraternal organizations, prior to its present use as a performance venue. It was listed on the National Register of Historic Places on December 30, 2008.

== Description and history ==
The Opera House at Boothbay Harbor stands near the northern end of Boothbay Harbor's downtown area, at the southwest corner of Townsend Avenue and Smith Street. It is a large 3 1/2-story wood-frame structure, with a hip roof and brick foundation. Its exterior is finished mainly in wooden clapboards, with bands of decorative scallop-cut shingles. The main facade faces east toward Townsend Avenue, and is symmetrically arranged with paired sash windows in the outer bays. The center bay has the main entrance, accessed by a flight of granite steps flanked by decorative railings. The entry is also elaborate, with pilasters supporting a broad entablature and cornice. The second level has two windows flanked by paired pilasters, again with an entablature above. A three-part Palladian style window occupies the center third floor bay, above which a gabled wall dormer rises into the attic level. The interior of the building has a foyer, which opens into the main auditorium, featuring a stage with proscenium arch, and a balcony running along the sides and rear. The third floor historically housed meeting and storage spaces of the fraternal organizations using the hall, and now also includes a commercial kitchen.

The hall was built in 1894 to a design by the prominent Portland architectural firm of Francis H. Fassett and his son, Edward F. Fassett. It was built by the Pythian Hall Company as a multifunction space, housing the town offices as well as space for both the Knights of Pythias and the local Freemasons. It house town offices into the 1930s, and as a fraternal hall into the 1960s, with town meetings held here into the 1970s. During these periods it was also used as a community meeting and cultural event venue. At the time of its construction, it dominated the village skyline, which was otherwise mainly one and two-story wood-frame buildings. Sold in 1977 after the town ended its town meeting lease, the building was repurposed into a commercial retail space, and was in 2005 converted back into a performance venue.

== See also ==
- National Register of Historic Places listings in Lincoln County, Maine
- Knights of Pythias
