= Knights of Pythias Lodge (South Bend, Indiana) =

- U.S. National Register of Historic Places
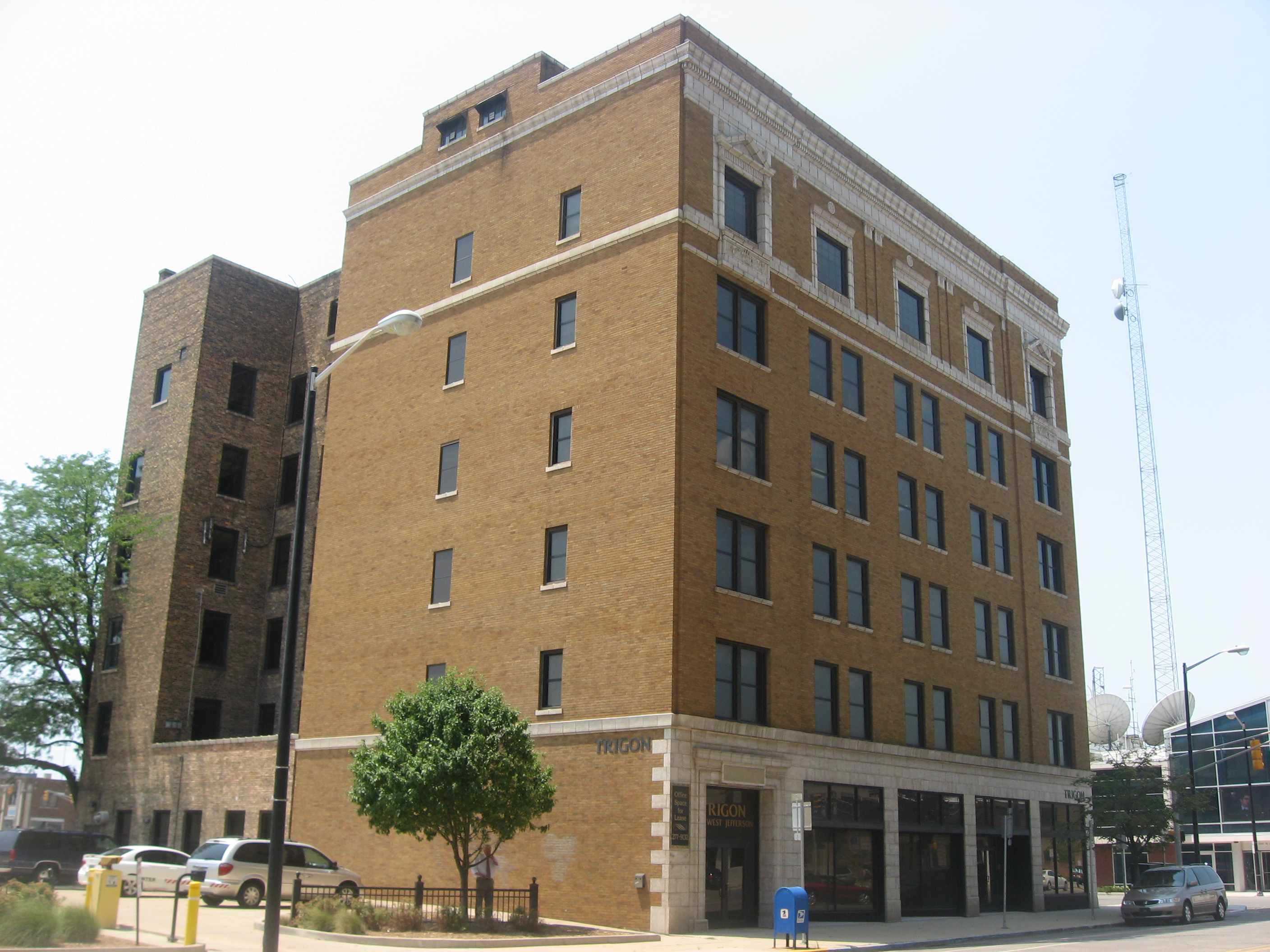
- Front and eastern side

- Location within Indiana Location within the United States
- Location: 224 W. Jefferson, South Bend, Indiana
- Coordinates: 41°40′29″N 86°15′11″W
- Area: Less than 1 acre (0.40 ha)
- Built: 1922
- Architect: W.W. Schneider; N. Roy Shambleau
- Architectural style: Chicago, Classical Revival
- MPS: Downtown South Bend Historic MRA
- NRHP reference No.: 85001219
- Added to NRHP: June 5, 1985

Knights of Pythias Lodge is a historic Knights of Pythias building located at South Bend, Indiana. It was built in 1922, and is a seven-story, Commercial style brick building with terra cotta. The building features applied Classical Revival style design elements.

It was listed on the National Register of Historic Places in 1985.
