= Pythian Castle (Toledo, Ohio) =

- U.S. National Register of Historic Places
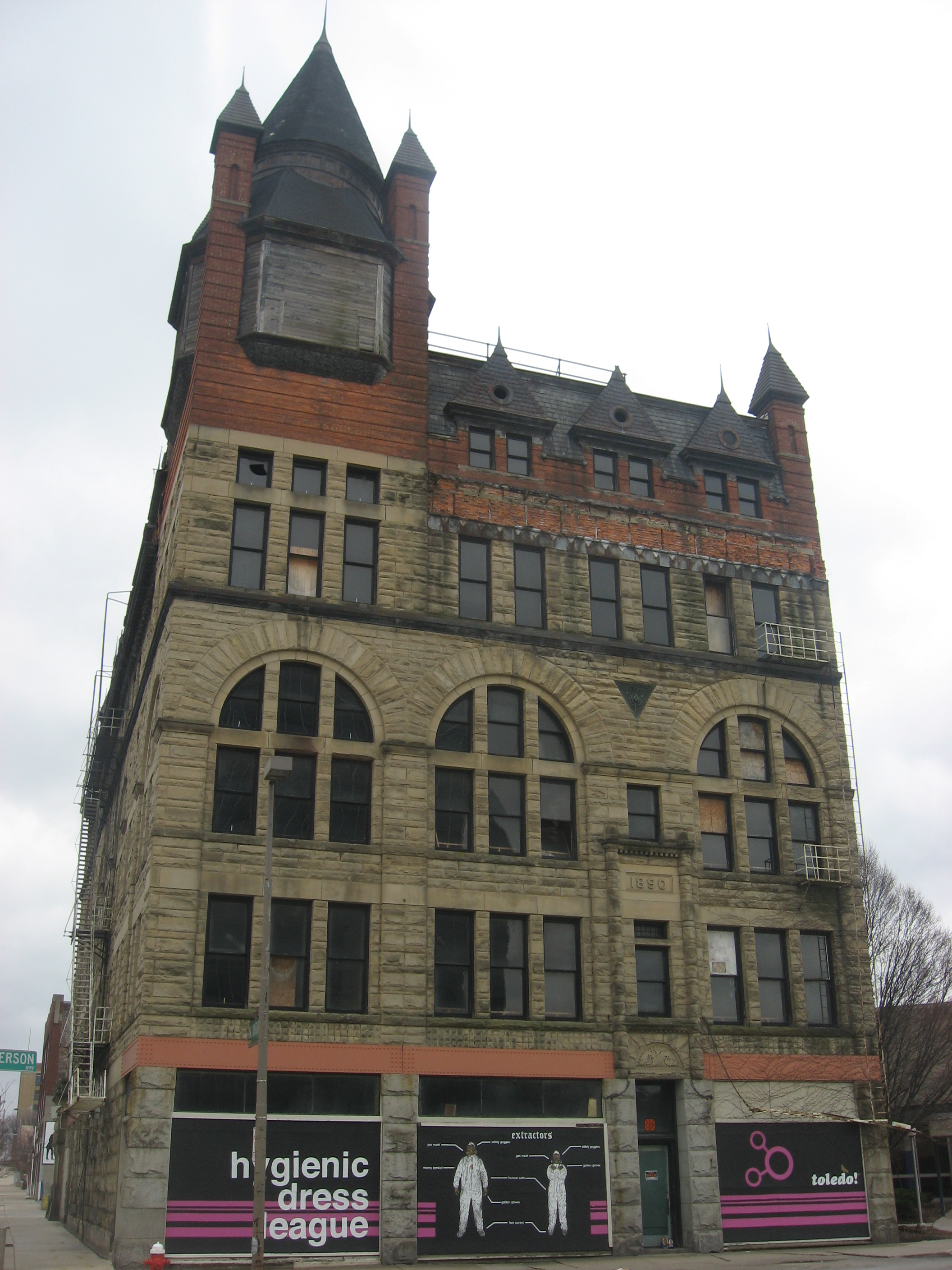
- Front and eastern side

- Location within Ohio Location within the United States
- Location: 801 Jefferson Ave., Toledo, Ohio 43604
- Coordinates: 41°39′8″N 83°32′25″W
- Area: less than one acre
- Built: 1890
- Architect: Bacon & Huber
- Architectural style: Romanesque
- NRHP reference No.: 72001032
- Added to NRHP: February 23, 1972

The Pythian Castle in Toledo, Ohio, is a Romanesque-style building built in 1890. Located in Toledo's Center City at the corner of Jefferson Avenue and N. Ontario Street, it was listed on the National Register of Historic Places in 1972.

== History ==
The 30,000-square-foot building was built in 1890 by the Knights of Pythias, a fraternal organization and secret society, to use as a meeting place. The building was designed by Norval Bacon and Thomas Huber, partners of the Toledo architectural firm of Bacon & Huber. The highest point of the Pythian Castle, the turret on Jefferson Avenue at City Center, rises 122 ft (37 m) above the street. The height of the main roof is 79 ft (24 m).

In 1908, it was described as "the finest building to be found anywhere entirely devoted to the uses of Pythianism."

The building also had retail space. One early tenant was the J.W. Green Co., a retail and wholesale dealer in pianos and organs.

In 1951, the group sold the building to Greyhound Lines and left.

In the 1970s, the building was owned by Ed Emery, a resident of Sylvania, Ohio. He ran a youth center and rented space to music store, an art studio, and an antique shop. In 1972, he got the building placed on the National Register of Historic Places.

A fire in 1978 put an end to the building's active occupation, and it fell into disrepair. In 2006, then-Mayor Carty Finkbeiner put it on his 'Dirty Dozen" list of the city's worst-maintained buildings.

In the late 20th and early 21st century, the building was owned by Robert Shiffler, who died in 1997, and Brian Uram, who died in 2011. Uram said in 2004 that the two men had poured $250,000 into attempts to stabilize the decaying building, including a temporary replacement roof.

In 2013, the building was owned by Toledo's Pythian Castle LLC, an Ohio limited liability corporation.

In early 2013, the Toledo Blade wrote about the building's history. A series of photos revealed a dilapidated interior.

On July 10, 2013, the building was acquired by the Lucas County Land Bank for redevelopment.

In November 2016, the Land Bank sold the building to developer David Ball for $300. The deal also gave a $274,000 loan to Ball to cover the cost of a new roof and the stabilization of its turret. Lucas County Treasurer Wade Kapszukiewicz, the Land Bank's chairman, said the loan would be forgiven if the renovations produced "a certificate of occupancy for the building from the city saying it is a habitable building" within three years.

In February 2017, renovations were begun by Ball's company, Water Street Development LLC.

In June 2022, the Toledo Blade reported "progress on the project, putting on a new roof, replacing windows, and getting the heat and electricity on again. The building could be ready to take in tenants soon."

== Gallery ==
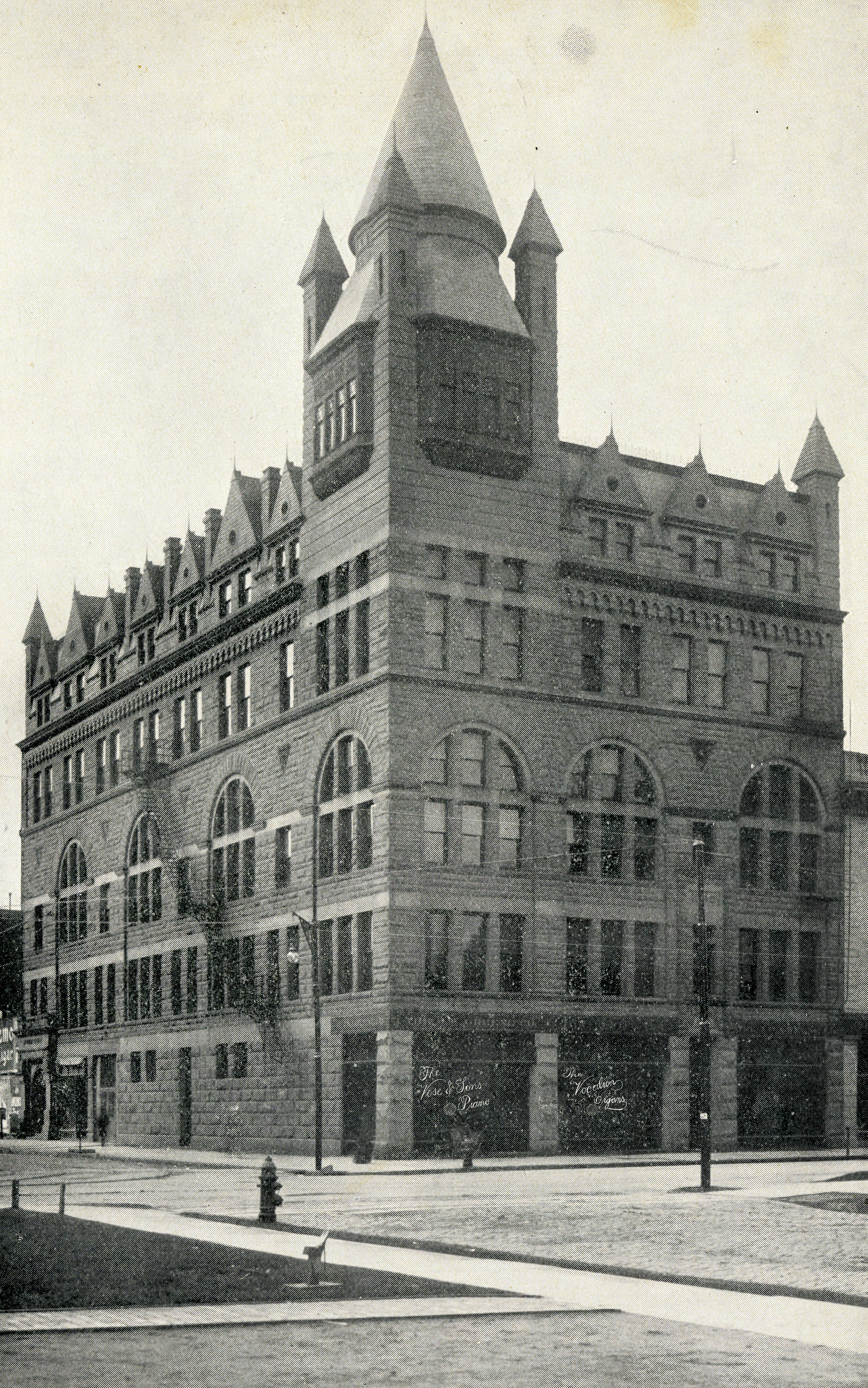
From "Year book : photo flashes showing Toledo's phenomenal progress, thriving industries and wonderful resources" in 1905

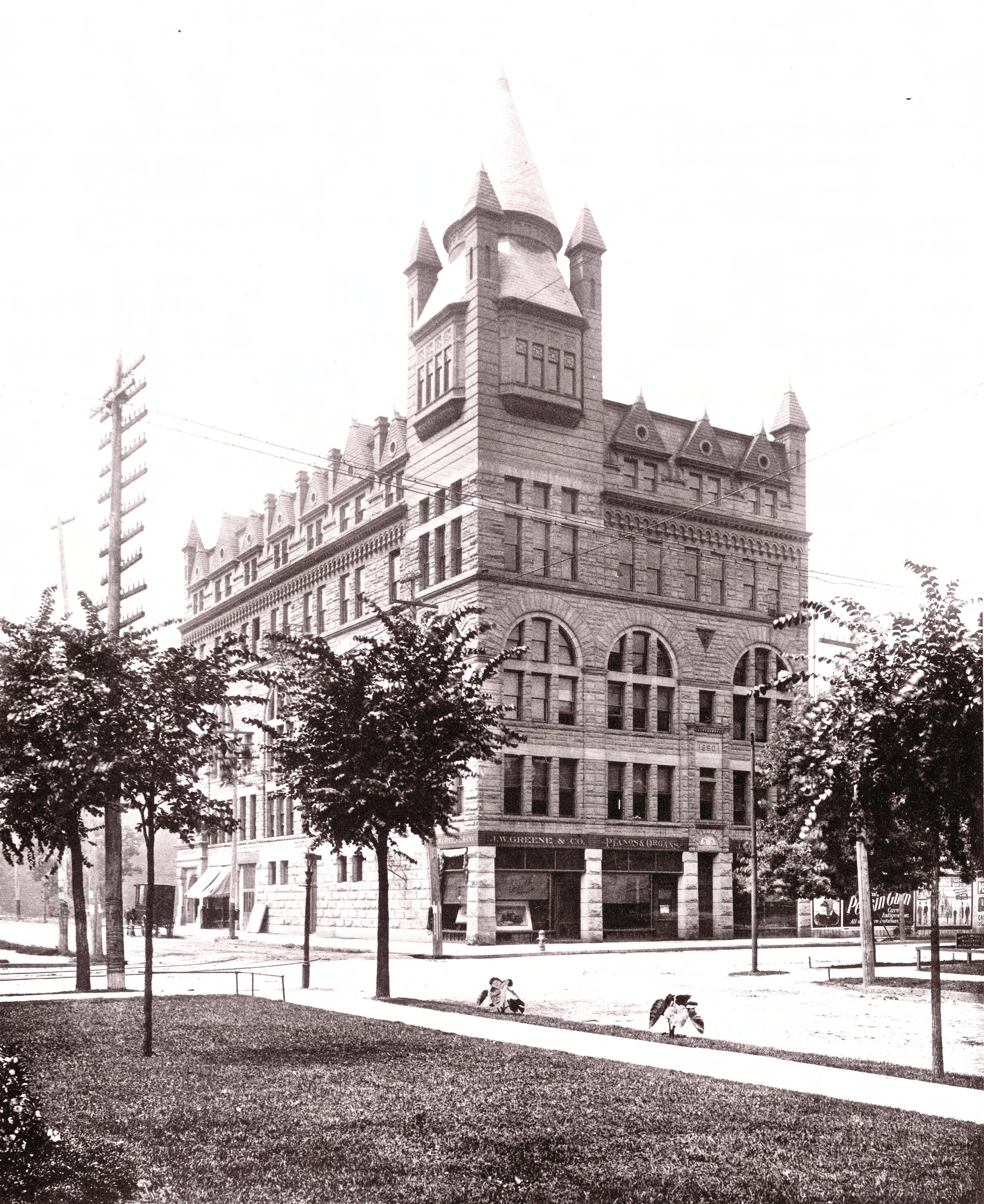
From "Art work of Toledo, Ohio" in 1895

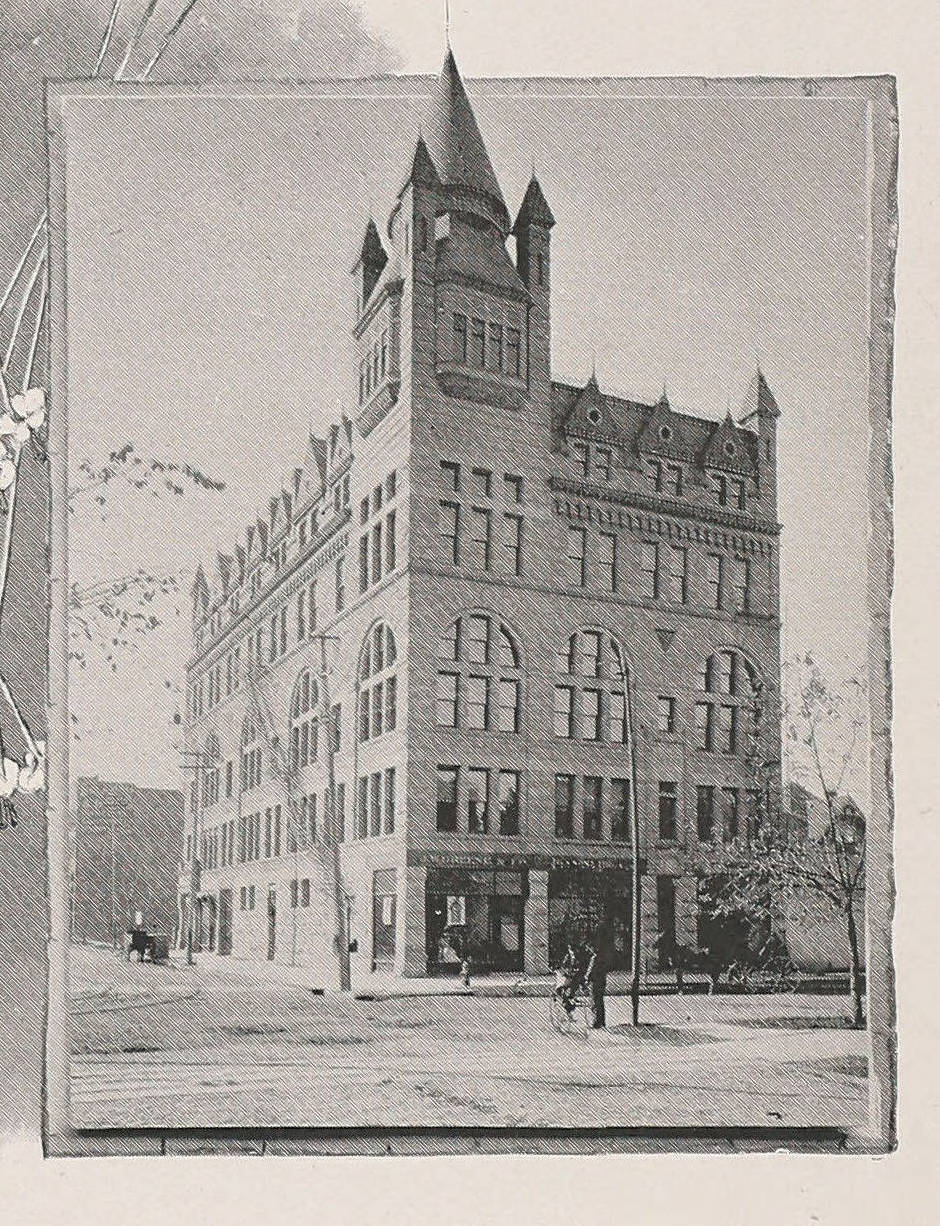
From "Toledo, Ohio: photographic views of the city's commercial and picturesque features" in 1893

== See also ==
- List of tallest buildings in Toledo, Ohio
