= Pythian Castle Lodge =

- U.S. National Register of Historic Places
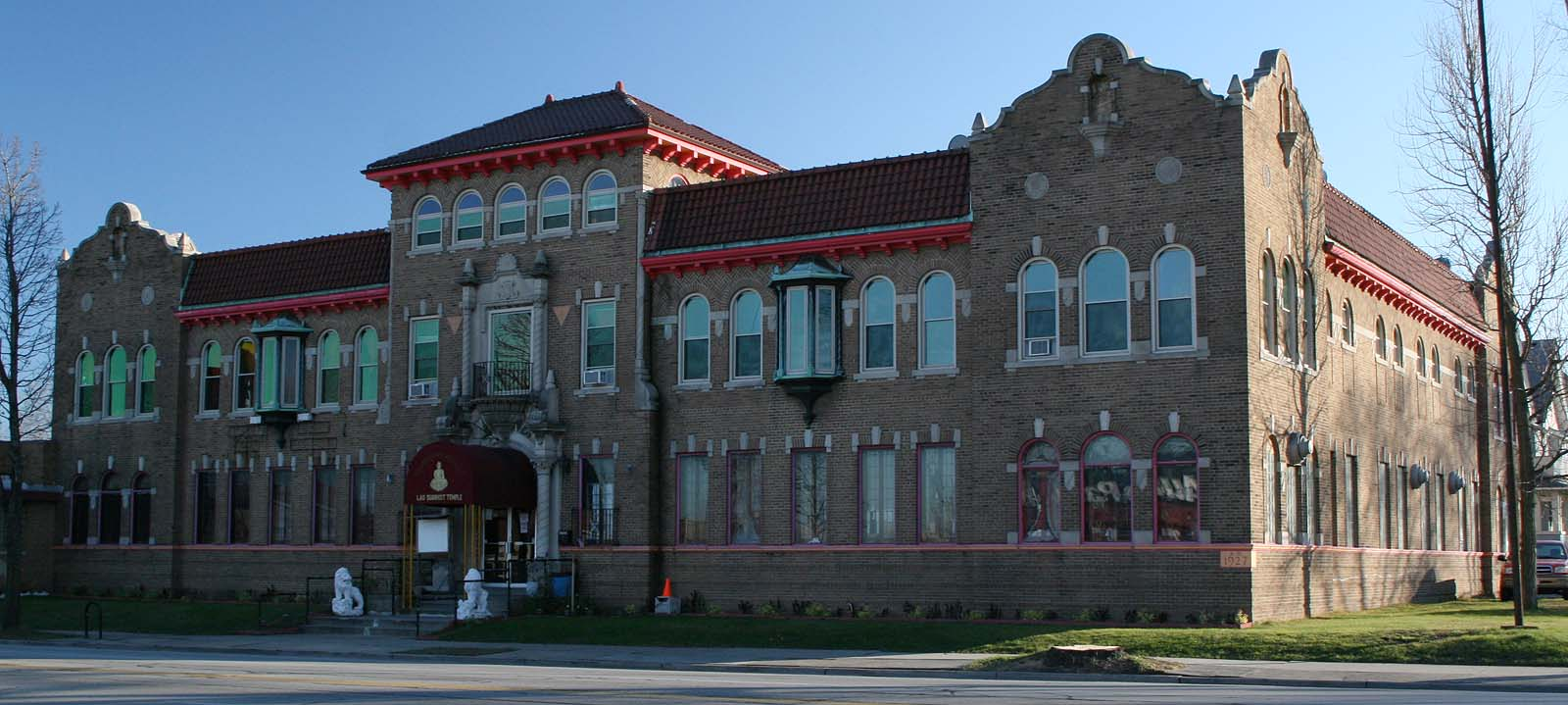

- Location within Wisconsin Location within the United States
- Location: 1925 W. National Ave., Milwaukee, Wisconsin
- Coordinates: 43°1′21″N 87°56′15″W
- Area: less than one acre
- Built: 1927
- Architect: Richard E. Oberst
- Architectural style: Mission/Spanish Revival, Spanish Colonial Revival
- NRHP reference No.: 88000089
- Added to NRHP: February 25, 1988

The Pythian Castle Lodge, also known as Crystal Palace, in Milwaukee, Wisconsin, United States, was built in 1927 by the Knights of Pythias, a fraternal organization. In 1988 it was listed on the National Register of Historic Places.

The Knights of Pythias is a fraternal organization founded in 1864 in Washington, D.C., aiming to promote the qualities of friendship, loyalty, honor and justice demonstrated in the ancient Greek legend of Damon and Pythias. Chapters sprouted up across the U.S., including one in Milwaukee in 1870. This was Schiller Lodge, No. 3, which was a German-speaking group. By the 1890s, Schiller lodge had switched to an English-language ritual and Milwaukee had three other Pythian lodges on the south side: Taylor Lodge, Walker Lodge, and National Lodge, No. 141. In 1909, those four men's lodges banded together with Pythian Sisters Purity Temple and the Rathbone Sisters Star Temple. The merged group rented meeting spaces for years. In 1921, they decided to build their own hall.

The new meeting hall on National Avenue was designed by Milwaukee architect Richard Oberst. It is a two-story brick structure on a poured concrete foundation with a roof that is flat in parts and hipped elsewhere, covered in clay tile. This much is a Mediterranean Revival style. But the structure also has pavilions on the corners with curve-topped parapets, drawn from Spanish Colonial Revival style.

Oberst also designed the Excelsior Masonic Temple at 2422 W. National Avenue in Milwaukee, a Classical Revival building from 1922 that was deemed to be NRHP-eligible but was not listed on the NRHP due to owner objection.

This Pythian Castle was built during the heyday of the Pythians. In the 1920s they were the third largest fraternal organization in the western world. Unlike the Freemasons, the Pythians rented their space out to other organizations, including labor groups like the Order of Railroad Engineers, the Harvester Tool Makers, Painters and Varnishers, the Firefighters Local No. 215, the Hatters Local, and the Die Sinkers Union; also the Squirrel Club, the South Side Civic Association, and the Navy Fathers.
