= Knights of Pythias Building (Phoenix, Arizona) =

- U.S. National Register of Historic Places
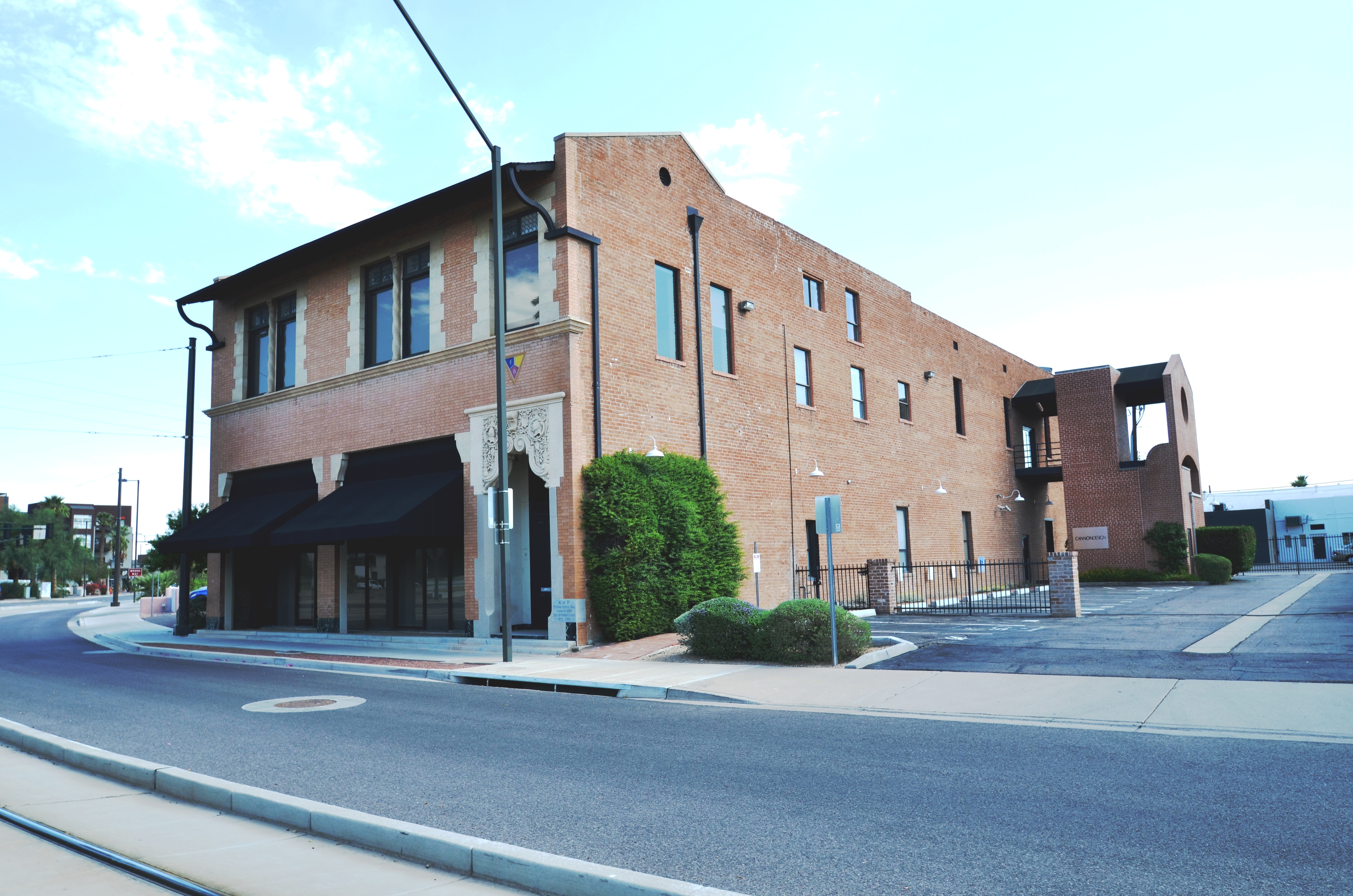

- Location within Arizona Location within the United States
- Location: 829 N. 1st Ave., Phoenix, Arizona
- Coordinates: 33°27′27″N 112°4′27″W
- Area: less than one acre
- Built: 1928
- Built by: T.J. Weatherford
- Architect: Lescher & Mahoney
- Architectural style: Mission/Spanish Revival
- MPS: Phoenix Commercial MRA
- NRHP reference No.: 85002063
- Added to NRHP: September 4, 1985

The Knights of Pythias Building in Phoenix, Arizona, United States, was built in 1928. It has served as a clubhouse and as a specialty store. It was listed on the National Register of Historic Places in 1985.

It was designed by local architects Lescher & Mahoney.

== Images ==
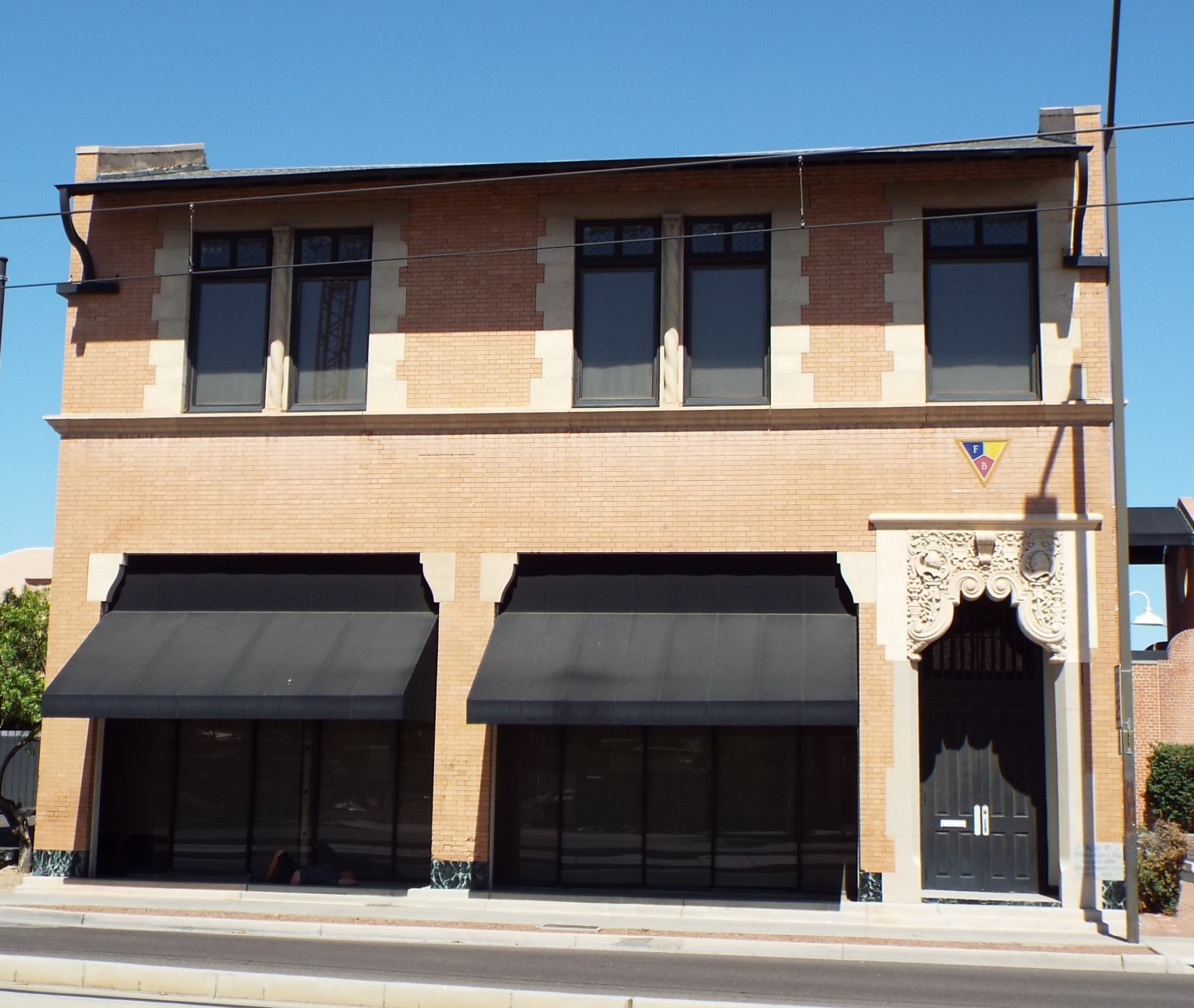
The Knights of Pythias Building was built in 1928 and is located at 849 N. 1st Ave. It is listed in the National Register of Historic Places, reference: #85002063.

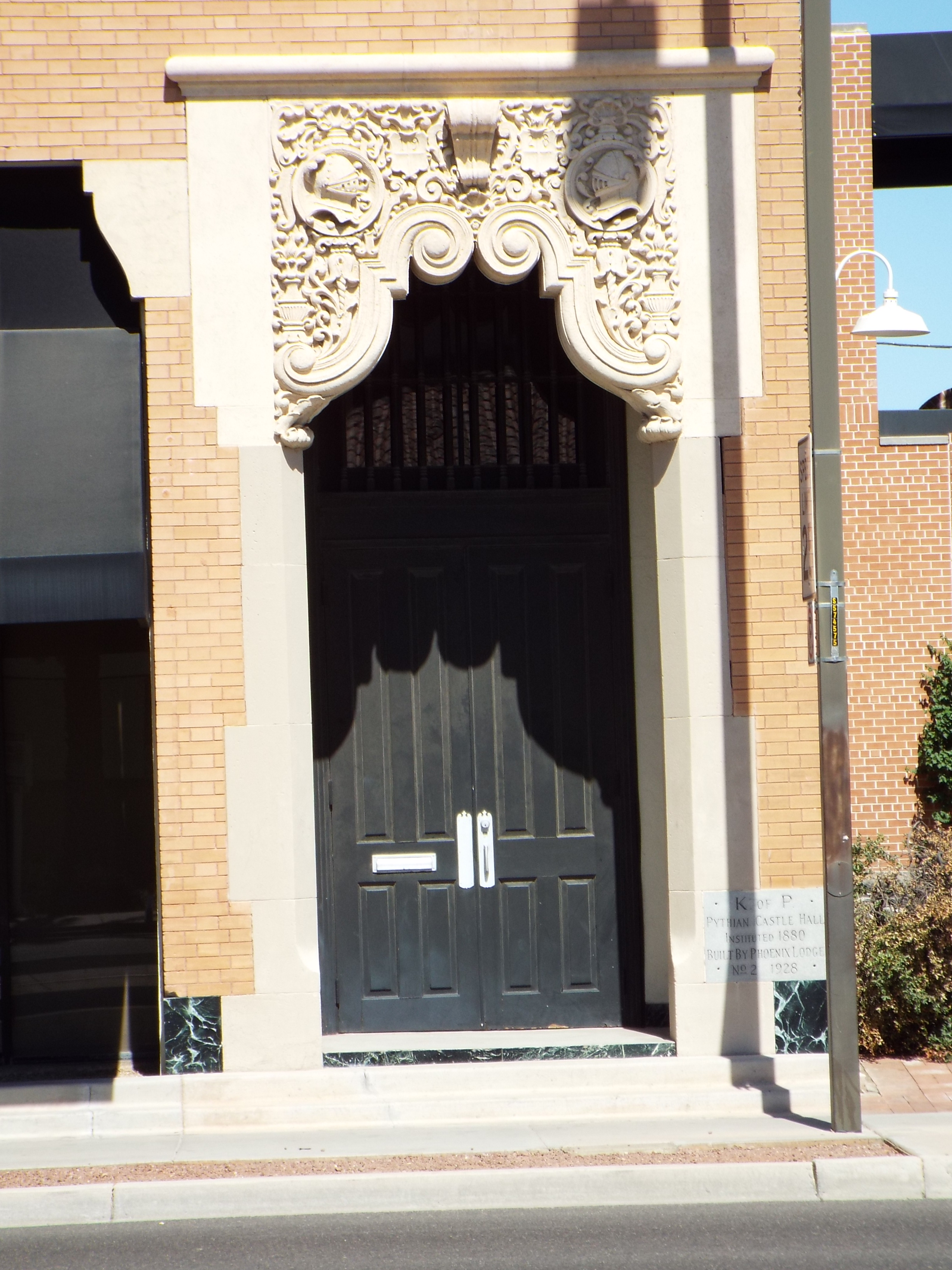
Front entrance of the Knights of Pythias Building.
