= Knights of Pythias Building (Fort Worth, Texas) =

Historic place in Fort Worth, Tarrant County, Texas

- U.S. National Register of Historic Places
- Recorded Texas Historic Landmark
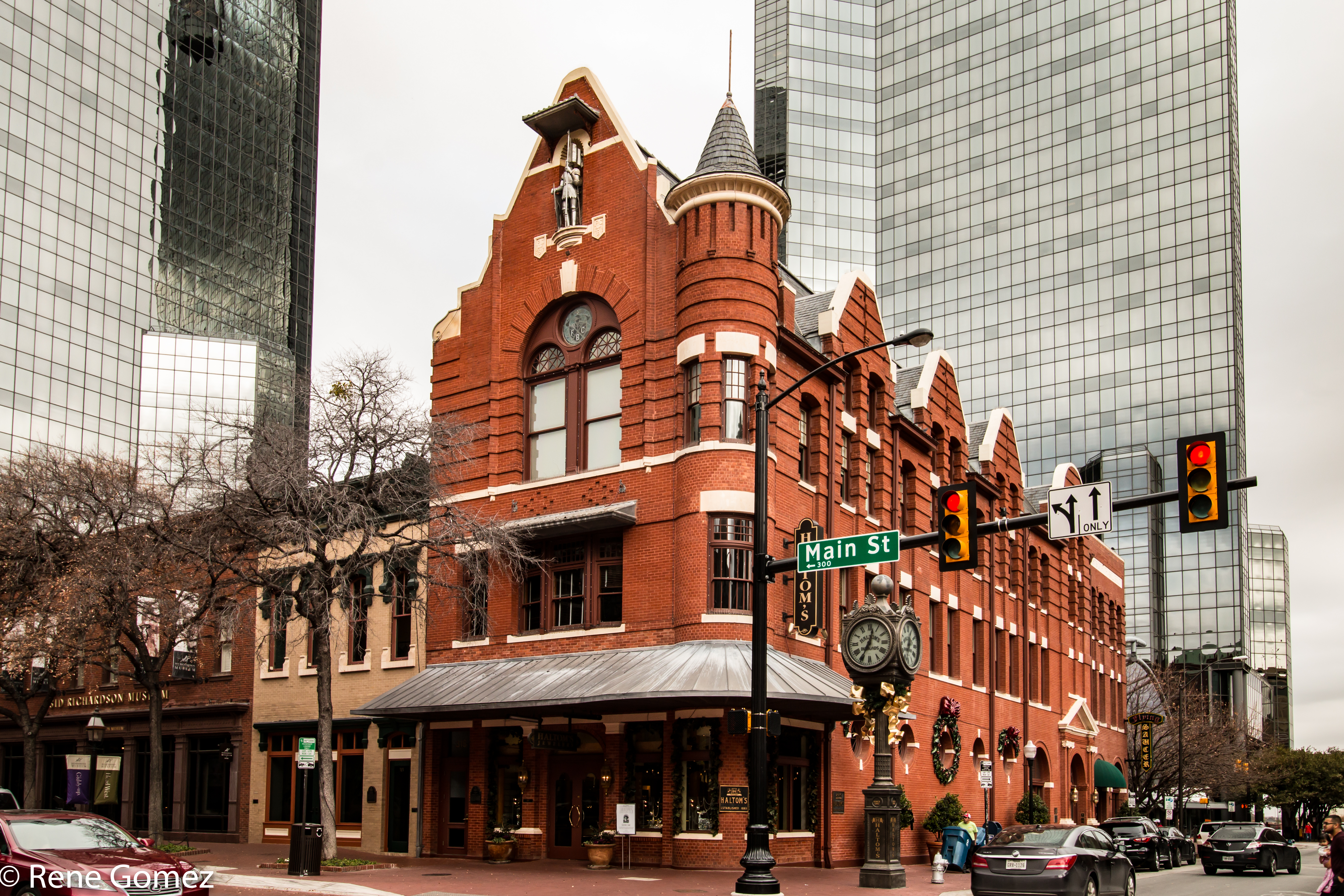
- Knights of Pythias Building in 2016

- Location within Texas Location within the United States
- Location: 315 Main St.; Fort Worth, Texas
- Coordinates: 32°45′19″N 97°19′52″W
- Area: 0.2 acres (0.081 ha)
- Built: 1901
- Architect: Sanguinet & Staats
- Architectural style: Medieval
- NRHP reference No.: 70000761
- RTHL No.: 2967

Significant dates
- Added to NRHP: 28 April 1970
- Designated RTHL: 1962

The Knights of Pythias Building is an historic three-story redbrick Knights of Pythias building located at 315 Main Street in Fort Worth, Texas. Also known as the Knights of Pythias Castle Hall, it was built in 1901 on the site of an 1881 structure, the first Pythian Castle Hall ever built, which had burned earlier the same year. The building housed the city's first offset printing press and coin-operated laundry. On April 28, 1970, it was added to the National Register of Historic Places. The building is also a Recorded Texas Historic Landmark (RTHL). In 1981, it was restored and is now part of the Sundance Square area of downtown Fort Worth. The lead tenant in the building today is Haltom's Jewelers. (Note: Roberts, John. "Knights of Pythias Castle Hall". Architecture in Fort Worth. Archived from the original on 2022-06-08.)

== See also ==
- National Register of Historic Places listings in Tarrant County, Texas
- Recorded Texas Historic Landmarks in Tarrant County
