= Pythian Temple (Tacoma, Washington) =

- U.S. National Register of Historic Places
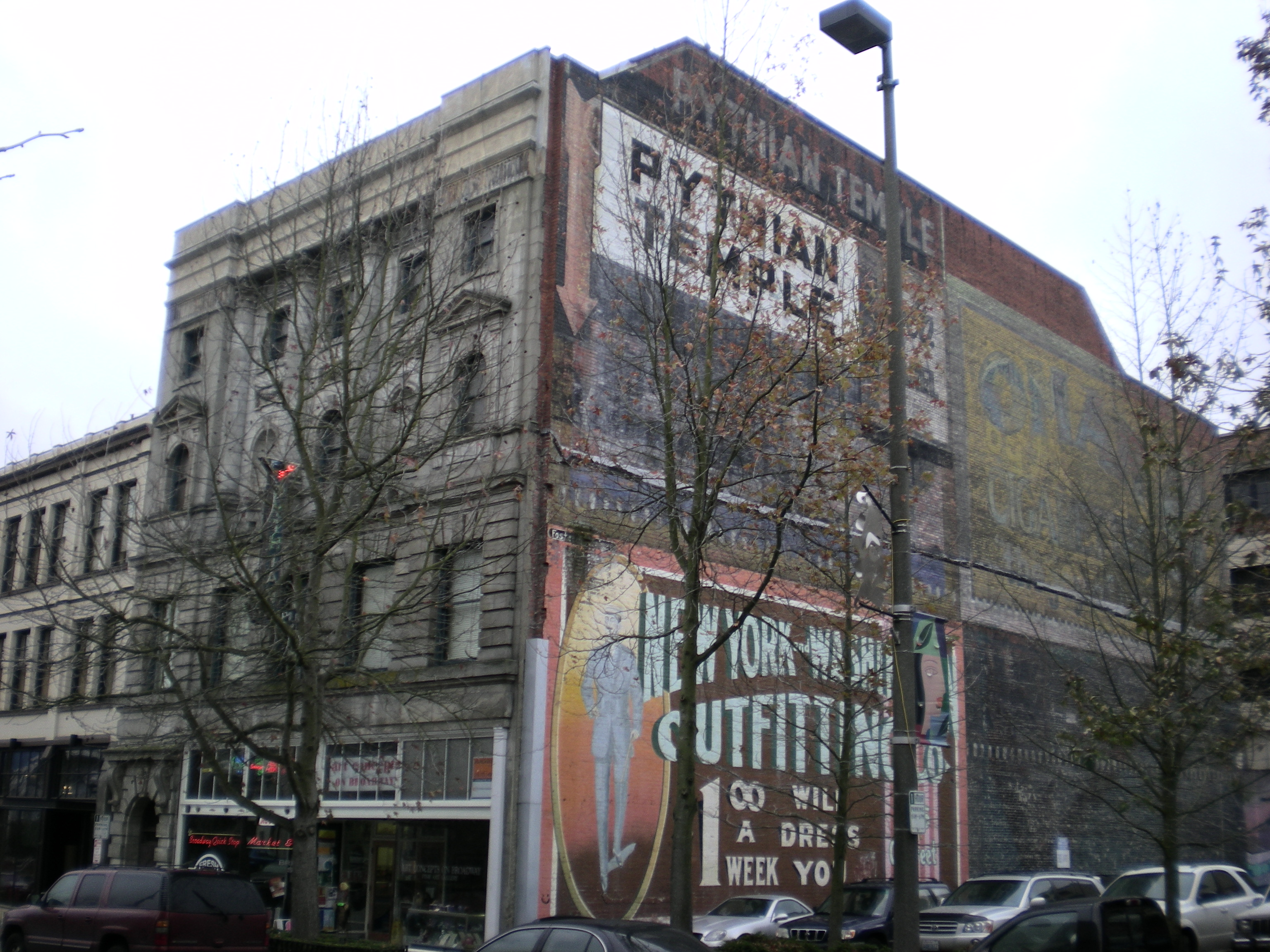
- Pythian Temple, February 6, 2008

- Location within Washington (state)
- Location: 924-926 1/2 Broadway, Tacoma, Washington
- Coordinates: 47°15′17″N 122°26′23″W
- Area: less than one acre
- Built: 1906
- Architect: Frederick Heath (architect); Cowan & Black
- Architectural style: Late 19th and 20th Century Revivals, Second Renaissance Revival
- NRHP reference No.: 85001811
- Added to NRHP: August 23, 1985

The Pythian Temple, built in 1906 for Commencement Lodge Number 7 of the Knights of Pythias, is an historic building located on Broadway in the Theater District of Tacoma, Washington. It was designed by noted Tacoma architect Frederick Heath.

Like many multistory urban fraternal buildings built in the late 19th and early 20th centuries, its lower floors were rented out for retail and office spaces while the upper floors were reserved for lodge use. This pattern of usage continues into the 21st century for this building, although Commencement Lodge plans to renovate the building to permit the rental of its hall for cultural events.

On August 23, 1985, Pythian Temple was added to the National Register of Historic Places.

The building was featured in the summer 2008 newsletter of the Marian Dean Ross Pacific Northwest Chapter of the Society of Architectural Historians. The group reported that the Pythian order remains active and is working to preserve its 1906 building and has received grants for work on the Knights of Pythias Castle Hall. "This two-story hall, completely hidden within the building's interior, is a rich confection of early 20th Century woodwork, plaster, lighting, murals and carpeting."

For a short period in the mid-1990s, the Pythian Temple hosted a local theater company, and its ornate auditorium was the setting for productions of such plays as Rosencrantz And Guildenstern Are Dead, Inherit the Wind, 12 Angry Men, and Talk Radio.

In addition to the Knights of Pythias, the building houses the Tacoma Youth Theater and Seabury Middle School.

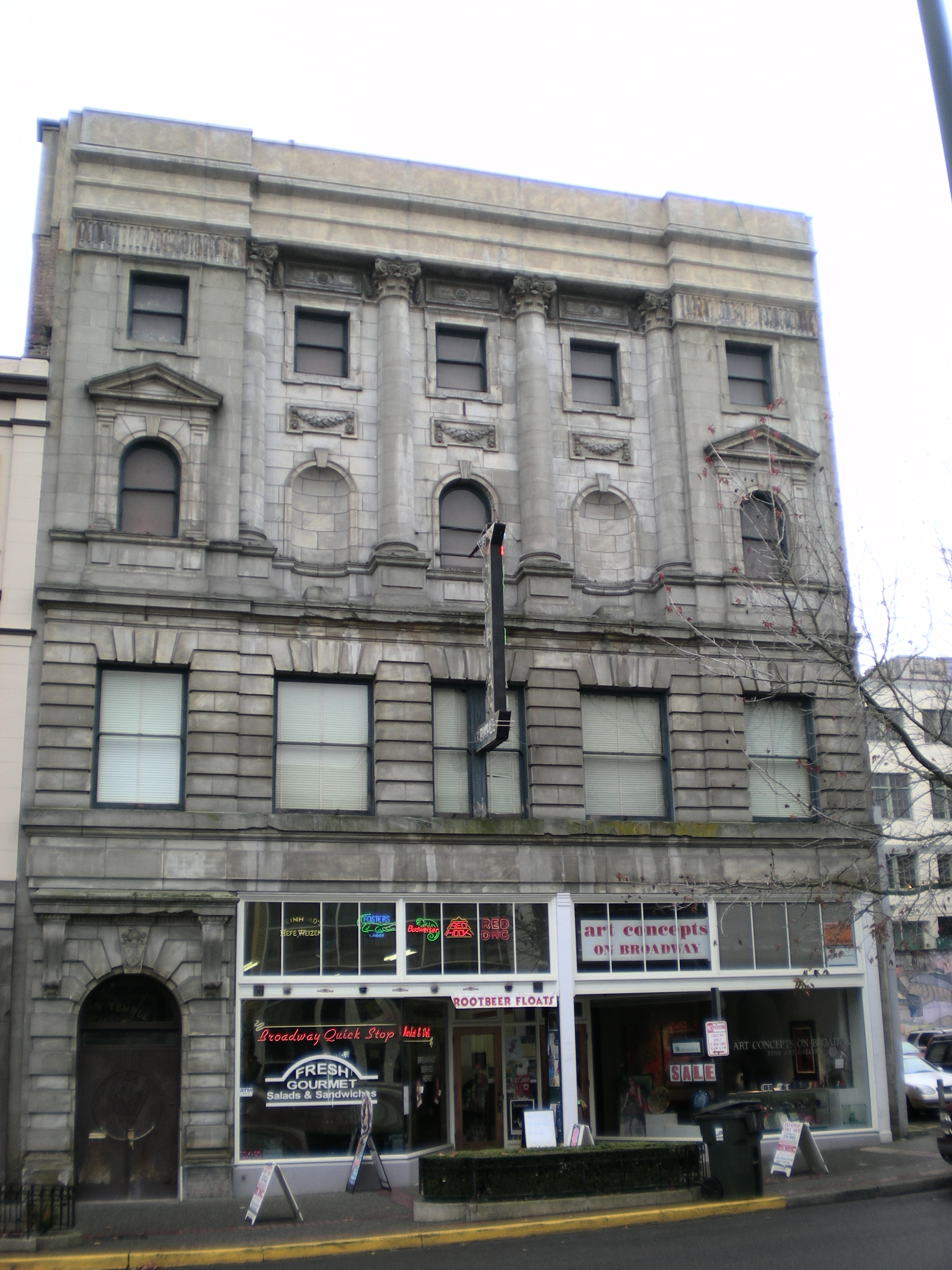

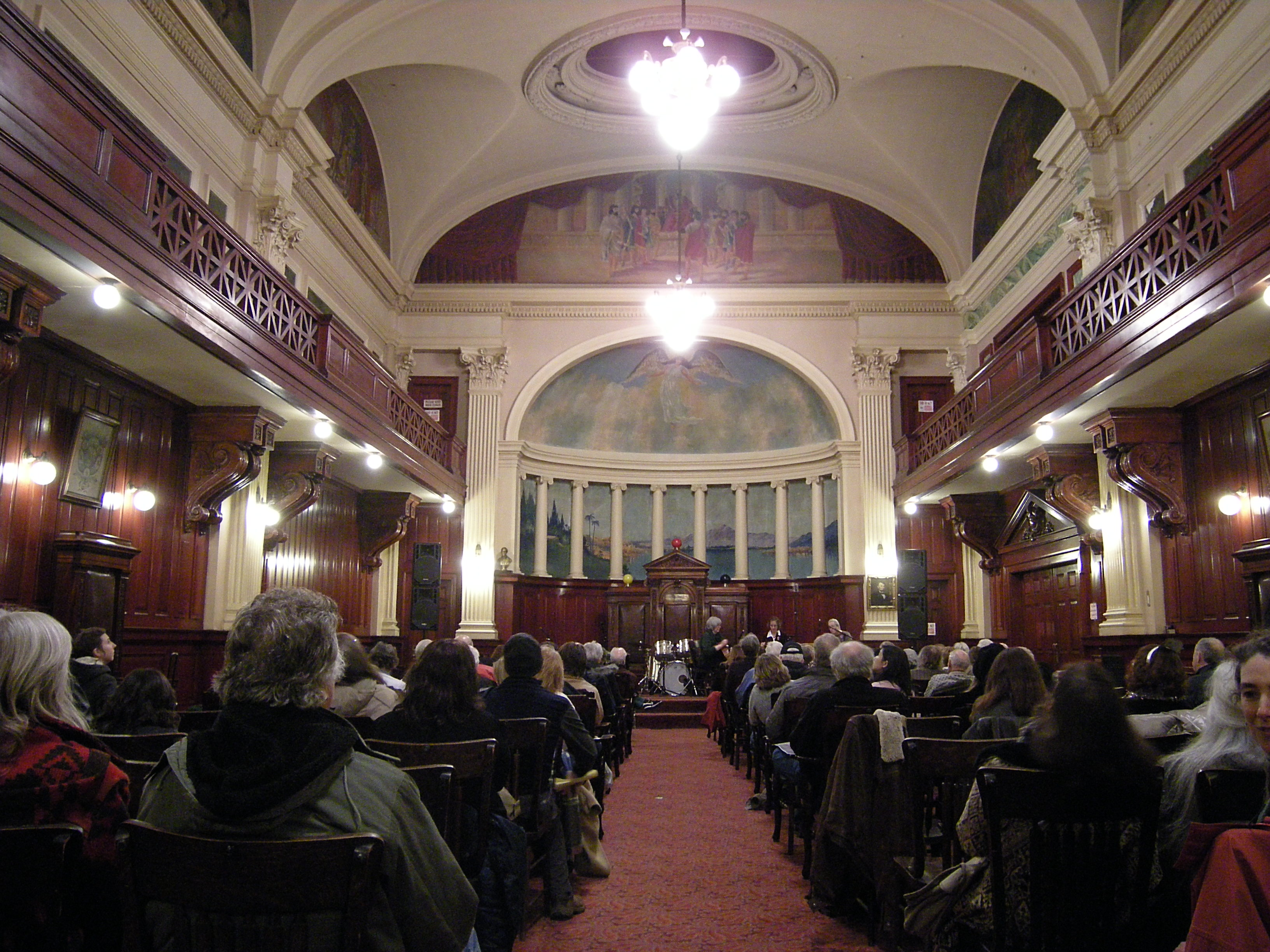
Interior of Castle Hall, Pythian Temple, Tacoma
