= King Arts Complex =

Arts center in Columbus, Ohio

- Pythian Temple and James Pythian Theater
- U.S. National Register of Historic Places
- Columbus Register of Historic Properties
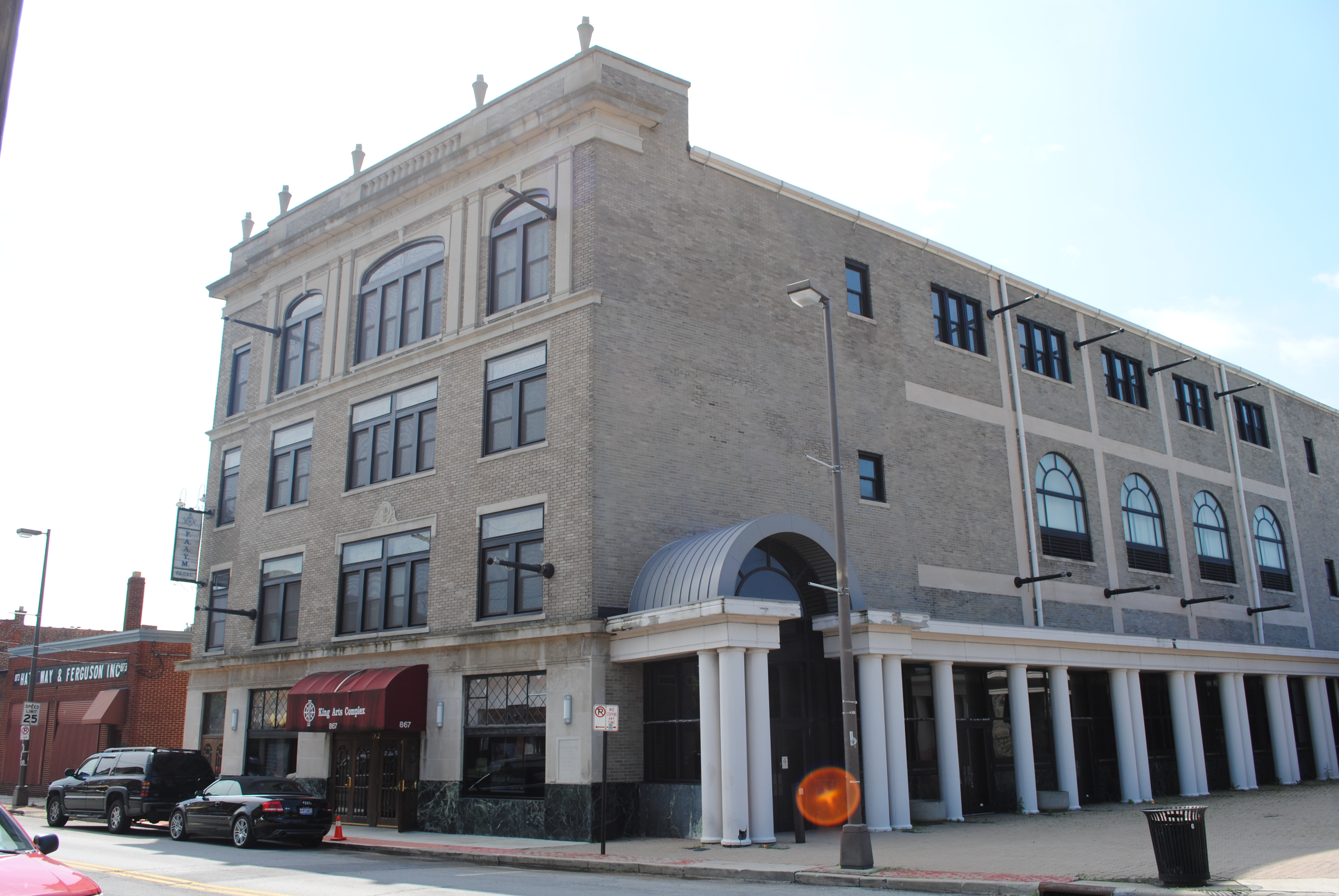
- Interactive map highlighting the building's location
- Location: 835 Mt. Vernon Ave., Columbus, Ohio
- Coordinates: 39°58′16″N 82°58′44″W
- Area: less than one acre
- Built: 1925
- Architect: Evans & Plato; LeVeque, L.L.
- Architectural style: Colonial Revival
- NRHP reference No.: 83004295
- CRHP No.: CR-18

Significant dates
- Added to NRHP: November 25, 1983
- Designated CRHP: April 4, 1983

The Martin Luther King Jr. Performing and Cultural Arts Complex is a historic building in the King-Lincoln Bronzeville neighborhood of Columbus, Ohio. It was built in 1925 as the Pythian Temple and James Pythian Theater, and was added to the National Register of Historic Places and Columbus Register of Historic Properties in 1983. The building was renovated into the King Arts Complex in 1987, and was vacated in 2019. Community leaders restored the building's use as an arts center in 2021.

== History ==
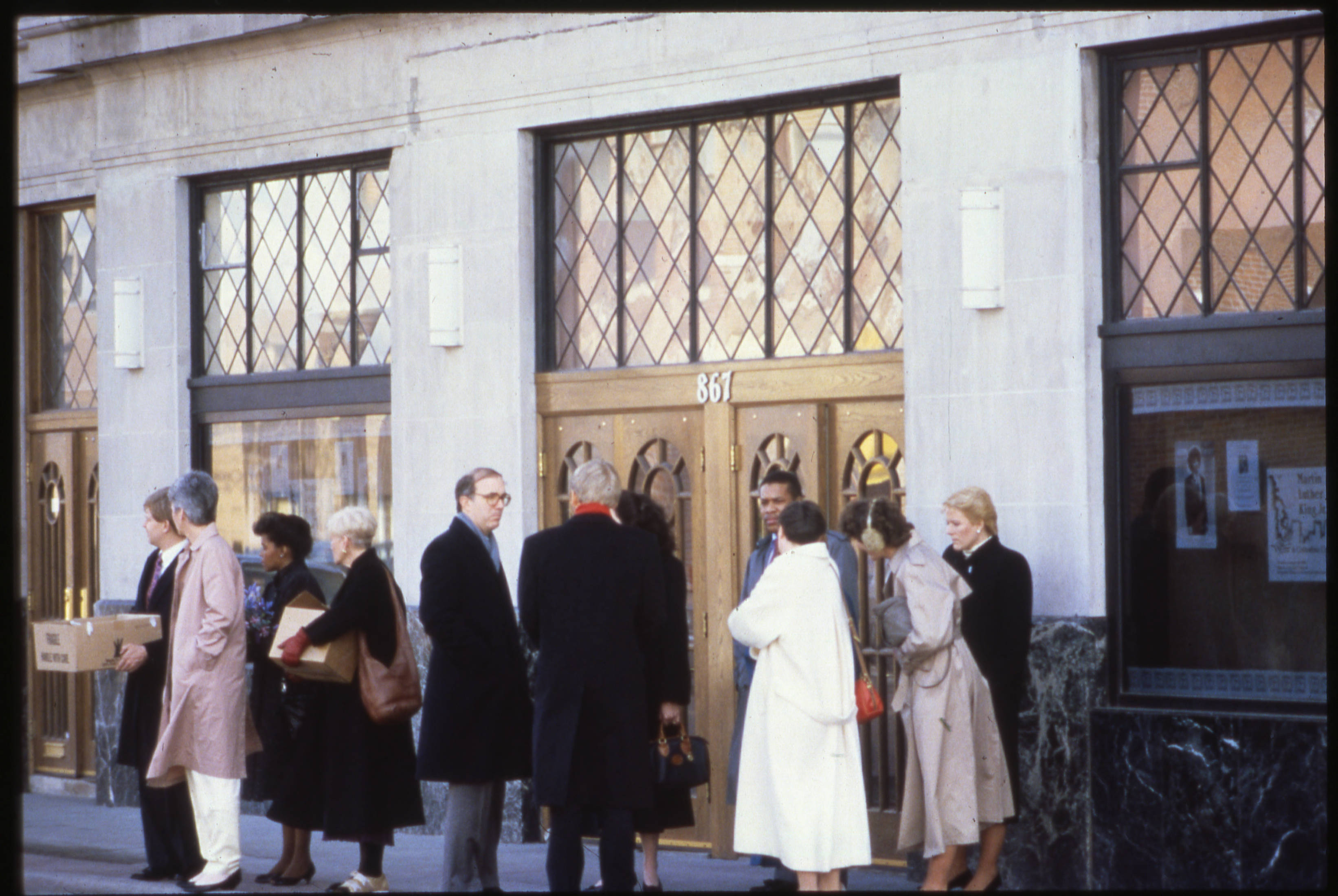
King Arts Complex entrance, 1987

The Pythian Temple was designed in the Colonial Revival architectural style by Samuel Plato, an African-American architect, and is his only work in Columbus. It was financed by the Knights of Pythias, a Black fraternal organization, and opened in 1926 and could accommodate roughly 1,000 people with a theatre, retail, offices, and lodge rooms. It quickly became the center of entertainment in the neighborhood, hosting performers including Cab Calloway, Count Basie, Duke Ellington and the Cotton Club Dancers.

It was added to the National Register of Historic Places on November 25, 1983.

In 1987, the temple was renovated by African-American owned architecture firm Moody Nolan to combine with Garfield Elementary School. The complex was renamed as the Martin Luther King Jr. Performing and Cultural Arts Complex, in memory of Dr. Martin Luther King Jr.

The building was listed as one of the most endangered sites in the city, in Columbus Landmarks' 2021 list. The King Arts Complex vacated the building in 2019, and a portion of it was listed for sale in 2020. In July 2021, the temple was entered a purchase agreement with the owners by Maroon Arts Group, a Black-led nonprofit based in the neighborhood. The group entered the agreement after the community expressed a desire to save the building.

== See also ==
- National Register of Historic Places listings in Columbus, Ohio
