= Pythian Castle (Portsmouth, Virginia) =

- U.S. National Register of Historic Places
- U.S. Historic district – Contributing property
- Virginia Landmarks Register
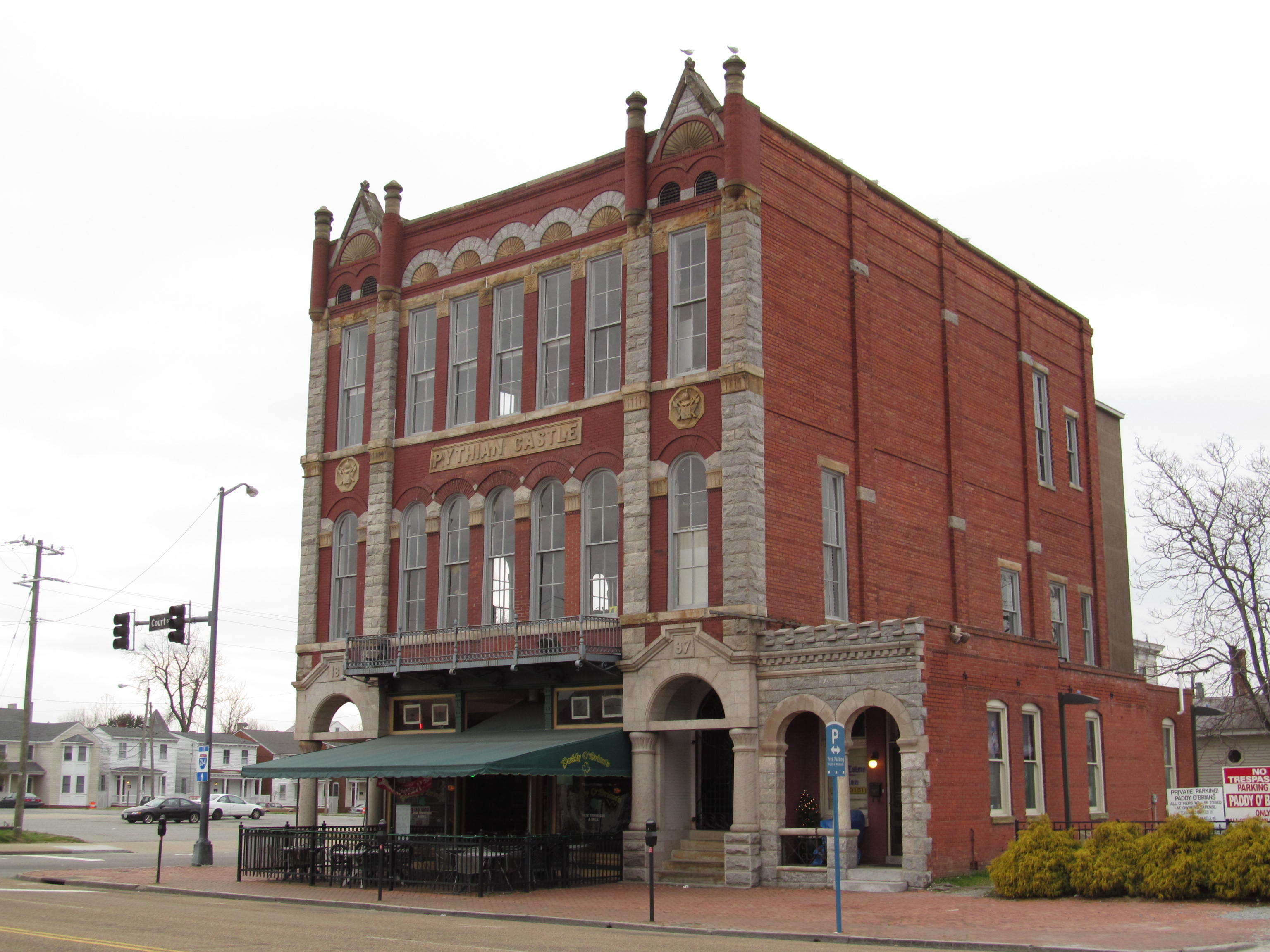
- Pythian Castle

- Location within Virginia Location within the United States
- Location: 610-612 Court St., Portsmouth, Virginia
- Coordinates: 36°50′1″N 76°18′5″W
- Area: 0.1 acres (0.040 ha)
- Built: 1897-1898
- Architect: Edward Overman
- Architectural style: Romanesque Revival
- NRHP reference No.: 80004316
- VLR No.: 124-0046

Significant dates
- Added to NRHP: October 30, 1980
- Designated VLR: July 31, 1980

The Pythian Castle is a historic three-story brick-and-stone Knights of Pythias building located at 610-612 Court Street in Portsmouth, Virginia. Built between 1897 and 1898 for the Atlantic Lodge, Knights of Pythias, it was designed by architect Edward Overman in the Romanesque Revival style of architecture. Like many multistory urban fraternal buildings built in the late 19th and early 20th centuries, its street floor was rented out for retail and office spaces while the upper floors were reserved for lodge use. In 1908 a single-story brick-and-stone Romanesque Revival addition was built to the north of the original building. In 1979 the Pythian Castle was sold by the knights. On October 30, 1980, it was added to the National Register of Historic Places. Today the ground floor is a Mexican eatery.

It is located in the Downtown Portsmouth Historic District.
