= St. Peter's Church (Tacoma, Washington) =

Historic church in Washington, United States

- U.S. National Register of Historic Places
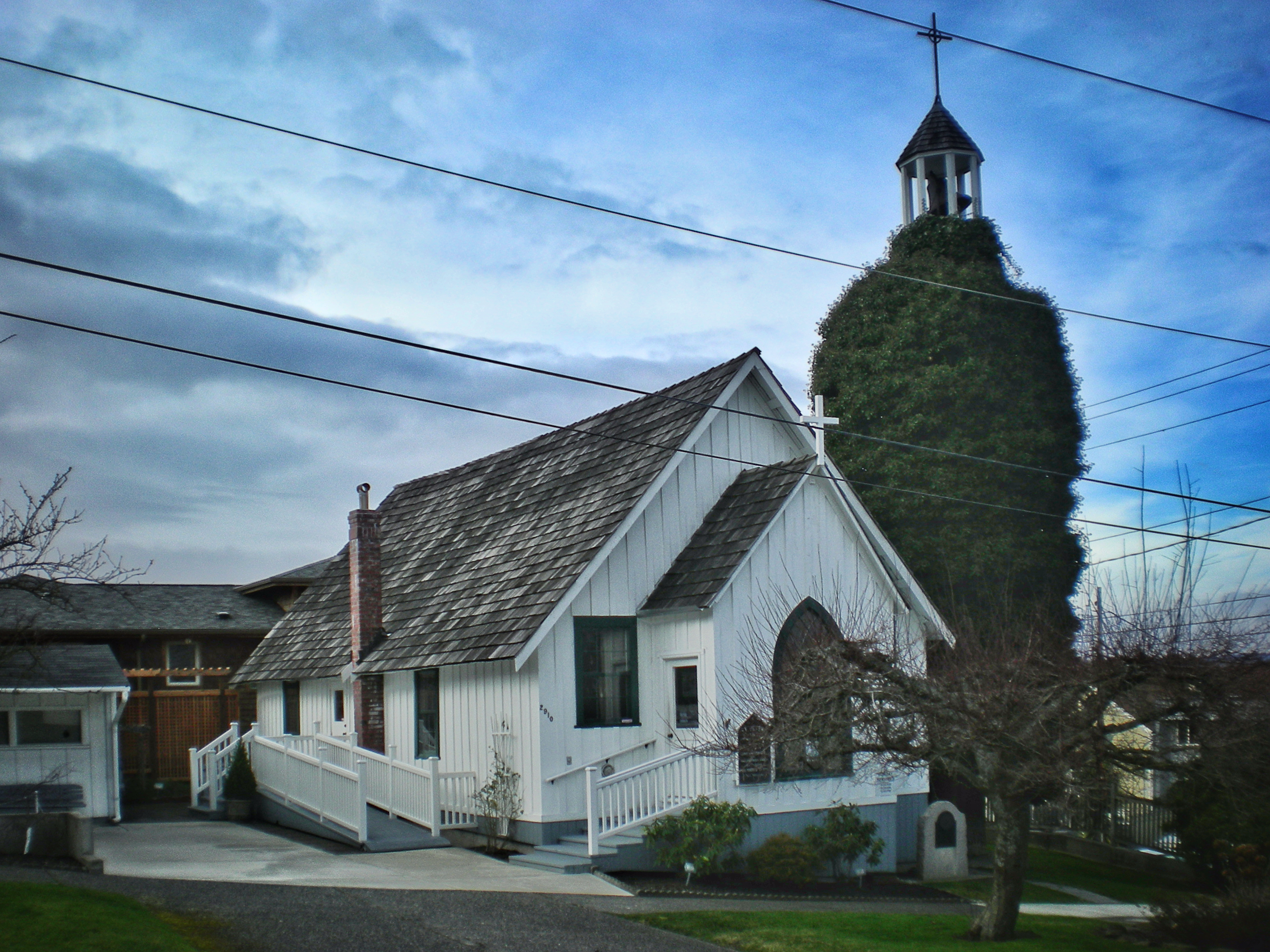

- Location within Washington (state)
- Location: Starr between 29th and 30th Sts., Tacoma, Washington
- Coordinates: 47°16′28″N 122°27′45″W
- Area: less than one acre
- Built: 1873
- Architect: Bonnell, Rev. C.R.
- NRHP reference No.: 74001974
- Added to NRHP: November 5, 1974

St. Peter's Church is a historic Episcopal church on Starr between 29th and 30th Streets in the Old Tacoma neighborhood of Tacoma, Washington, United States.

It was built in 1873 and added to the National Register in 1974. Old St. Peter's Church was the first church built in Tacoma and is now Tacoma's oldest existing building. The first services were held on August 10, 1873.

St. Peter's bell tower is unique. The bell was a gift from the Sunday school children at St. Peter's Church in Philadelphia. It arrived in October 1874, but the church in Tacoma had no belfry. Loggers cut off the top of a tree growing next to the church and a crew of sailors used the ship's rigging to hoist it up on the stump. The rings of the tree were counted when the tree was cut, revealing that it was over 300 years old. The tree claimed fame as "the oldest bell tower in America". The original tree stump was damaged by a windstorm in 1935 and had to be replaced.
