= Jewish Princess (song) =

Song by Frank Zappa

from the album Sheik Yerbouti
- Released: March 3, 1979
- Recorded: October 30, 1977
- Venue: The Palladium (New York City)
- Genre: Pop
- Length: 3:16
- Label: Zappa
- Songwriter: Frank Zappa
- Producer: Frank Zappa

Official audio
- "Jewish Princess" on YouTube

"Jewish Princess" is a song by American musician Frank Zappa, released on his double album Sheik Yerbouti (1979). This polemic song is about a man looking for a "nasty little Jewish Princess" with "long phony nails", "a garlic aroma that could level Tacoma", "a Yemenite hole", "a hair-do that rinses", "a couple of sisters that can raise a few blisters", "titanic tits", and "sand-blasted zits".

It attracted attention from the Anti-Defamation League (ADL), and Zappa stood by the song, arguing: "Unlike the unicorn, such creatures do exist—and deserve to be 'commemorated' with their own special opus". He said that the ADL's concerns were "as if to say there is no such thing as a Jewish Princess. Like I invented this?"

Biographer Barry Miles wrote that the ADL asked the Federal Communications Commission (FCC) to ban the record from being played on the air – a symbolic effort given that the song was not being played anyway. This led to the rumor that a legal action had been filed against Zappa, an accusation Zappa denied.

Zappa said that songs which offend people such as "Jewish Princess" are why Sheik Yerbouti became one of his best-selling albums. The song was rarely performed in concert. It was later included on his posthumous compilation album Have I Offended Someone? (1997).

== See also ==
- Aroma of Tacoma (referenced in the song)
