= Aroma of Tacoma =

Odor associated with Tacoma, Washington, US

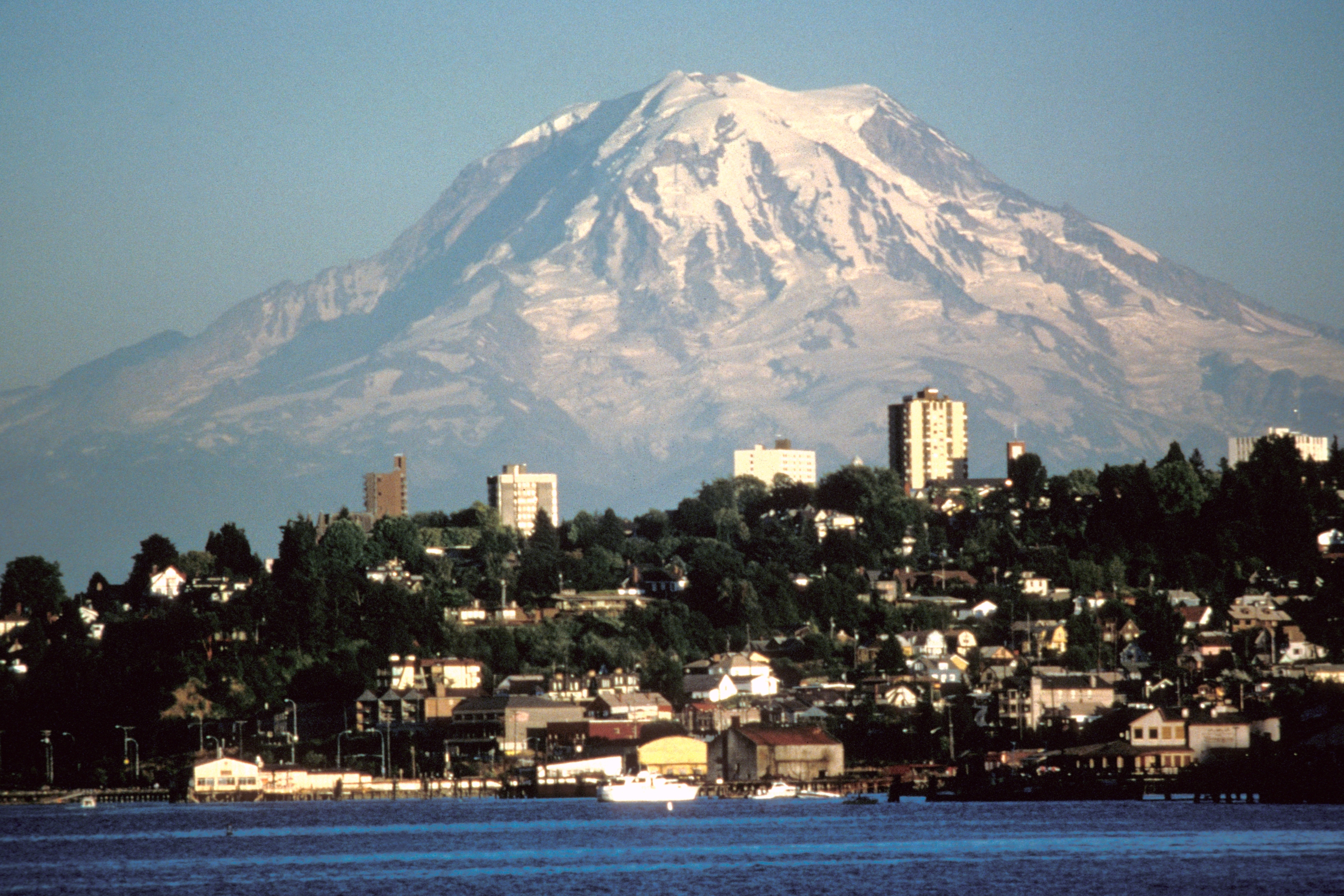
The city of Tacoma is known for its putrid smell, dubbed the "Aroma of Tacoma".

The Aroma of Tacoma, also known as the Tacoma Aroma, is a putrid and unpleasant odor associated with Tacoma, Washington, United States. The smell has been described as similar to the odor of rotten eggs. The odor is not noticeable throughout the city, but is rather concentrated in the Tacoma tideflats and is frequently smelled by motorists traveling that section of Interstate 5.

== History and origins ==
The odor has been commonly known as the "Aroma of Tacoma" since at least the early 1940s. However, there are instances of the word "aroma" being associated with Tacoma dating back to 1901 when resident George Francis Train penned a civic cheer:

Seattle! Seattle! Death Rattle, Death Rattle; Tacoma! Tacoma! Aroma, Aroma!

A variety of causes have been attributed to the Aroma of Tacoma, including sediment in Commencement Bay, sulfur released from the Simpson Tacoma Kraft pulp and paper mill, a rendering plant, the U.S. Oil refinery, or a combination of all of these factors. In 1997, the odor was exacerbated for several weeks after municipal officials unsealed a sewage tank that had not been opened in 15 years during the height of a stretch of humid weather. By the early 2000s, the odor had been lessened, but not eliminated, after the Tacoma Kraft pulp and paper mill installed new combustion technologies. The WestRock paper mill closed in September 2023.

== Local impact ==
The Aroma of Tacoma has been cited as the reason behind jokes about Tacoma, once frequently made by residents elsewhere in Western Washington. Research in 2003 suggested the Aroma of Tacoma had contributed to a long-term depression of housing prices in the city. Journalist and author Timothy Egan called it "one of the longest lasting nicknames in the Pacific Northwest" and used it in his book The Good Rain as an example of the many consequences of environmental destruction along Puget Sound.

During a concert stop at the Tacoma Dome in the mid-1980s, Bruce Springsteen reported the odor was so overwhelming that he was forced to leave town early. A local doctor said the noxious fumes were unhealthful. The EPA said the smell was due to total reduced sulfur emitted by the downtown paper mill, 1.5 miles (2.4 km) from the Tacoma Dome.

== Popular culture and public science ==
In the 1960s, Jim Torrence and Don Lemon with Diamond Jim and the Jazzmasters released a 45 rpm novelty single titled "The Aroma of Tacoma."

A rugby tournament held since the 1970s is called the "Tacoma Aroma", as well as a hip-hop band from the Tacoma area.

The Pacific Science Center held a symposium called "The science behind Tacoma's Aroma" in 2011.

The 1979 Frank Zappa song "Jewish Princess" mentions a "garlic aroma that could level Tacoma".
