= Tacoma Arts Live =

Theater in Tacoma, Washington

Coordinates: 47°15′18″N 122°26′30″W

Tacoma Arts Live is a 501(c)(3) non-profit organization located at the Tacoma Armory in downtown Tacoma, Washington. Tacoma Arts Live Conservatory and Education Department provide one of the largest performing arts education programs in Washington state.

Tacoma Arts Live hosted many famous figures and world-class artists such as Hal Holbrook, Debbie Reynolds, Martin Short, Queen Latifah, Joan Rivers, Wanda Sykes and Colleen Ballinger/Miranda Sings.

Tacoma Arts Live previously managed the Pantages Theater, Rialto Theater, and the Theatre on the Square from 1979-2021.

On January 28, 2026, the organization announced they would be closing on June 30, 2026 at the end of the 2025-26 season. Upon further decision by the board of directors, Tacoma Arts Live elected to enter receivership. Receivership is a court-supervised process for addressing the debts of an organization. The former board elected to enter receivership through an assignment for the benefit of creditors voluntarily, and Shelly Crocker LLC was appointed by the Pierce County Superior Court in mid-March. Now run by their receiver, the organization has announced continued programming through 2026 and into 2027.

== Artists, performers and premieres ==
=== 1980s ===
- Victor Borge
- Diane Schuur
- Marcel Marceau
- Dizzie Gillespie
- Hal Holbrook
- Mark Russell
- Myron Floren
- Itzhak Perlman
- Nikolai Arnoldovich Petrov
- Glenn Miller Orchestra

=== 1990s ===
- Alvin Ailey
- Bill Maher
- Dave Barry
- Marvin Hamlisch
- Victor Borge
- Wynton Marsalis
- Chick Corea
- Gregory Peck
- Debbie Reynolds

=== 2000s ===
- Bob Newhart
- Blind Boys of Alabama
- David Sedaris
- Garrison Keillor
- Martin Short
- Omara Portuondo
- Queen Latifah
- Doc Watson
- Randy Newman
- Treasure Island
- Sleeping Beauty
- My Fair Lady
- Caution: Men at Work
- RENT
- Grease
- Ricky Skaggs
- Fiddler on the Roof
- Spectrum Dance Co
- Joan Baez
- The Spencer's Theatre of Illusion
- Josh Blue
- Rush Limbaugh in Night School
- Billy Joel and Twyla Tharp's Movin' Out
- An Evening with Randy Cohen
- Young King Arthur
- Magic School Bus
- Doyle's Cabaret
- Footloose
- James & Giant Peach
- Chicago
- PHANTOM
- Ballet Folklorico
- Mick Maloney
- Newport Jazz 2002
- Forbidden Broadway
- Cinderella
- Sleeping Beauty
- Capitol Steps
- South Sound Slam
- Peking Acrobats
- Yesterday: Beatles
- Les Ballet Africains
- The Sound of Music
- Ballet Folklorico de Mexico
- Seattle Men's Chorus
- Ira Glass
- Dave Barry
- Guess How Much I Love You
- Big Bad Voodoo Daddy
- Tap Dogs
- Hawaiian Slack Key
- Soweto Gospel Choir
- Urban Cowboy: The Musical
- Out of Mist…A Dragon
- Shanghai Acrobats
- Gilbert & Sullivan's The Pirates of Penzance
- If You Give a Mouse a Cookie
- Sophisticated Ladies
- Lee Greenwood
- Pink Floyd Experience
- Nobodies of Comedy
- Mad Science: Newton's Revenge
- Operation Homecoming
- Peter Yarrow with Bethany and Rufus
- Lavay Smith and Her Red Hot Skillet Lickers
- Defending the Caveman
- Strut Your Mutt
- Sierra Leone's Refugee All Stars
- Peter Pan: The High Flying Musical
- Pine Leaf Boys
- Highland Heath & Holler
- The Wonder Bread Years
- Four Slices of Wry
- Cirqueworks Birdhouse Factory
- Ragamala Music & Dance Theater
- Dying To Be Thin
- The Acting Company (The Tempest/Moby Dick "Rehearsed")
- Not a Genuine Black Man
- Garrison Keillor
- Acia Gray & Tapestry Dance Company's Souls of Our Feet
- Show Way
- Woven Harmony
- 3 Redneck Tenors: A New Musical Adventure
- An Afternoon of Classic Lily Tomlin
- Wilson's Joe Turner's Come and Gone
- Do Jump!: Aerial Dance
- Altar Boyz
- Judy Collins with Tacoma Symphony Orchestra & Jonatha Brooke
- Book-It Repertory Theatre's Even Cowgirls Get the Blues
- An Evening with David Sedaris
- An Evening with Martin Short
- Scrooge: The Movie Musical

=== 2010s ===
- Joan Rivers
- Wanda Sykes
- Ira Glass
- Ladysmith Black Mambazo
- Gaelic Storm
- Smothers Brothers
- Jo Dee Messina
- Margaret Cho
- August Wilson's Seven Guitars
- Nanci Griffith
- Sweeney Todd: A Musical Thriller in Concert
- Oregon Shakespeare Festival
- Wayne Brady
- Video Games Live
- Colleen Ballinger/Miranda Sings
