= Don Pugnetti Park =

Public park in Tacoma, Washington, U.S.

- Interactive map of Don Pugnetti Park
- Location: Tacoma, Washington, U.S.
- Coordinates: 47°14′36″N 122°26′9″W
- Area: .5 acres (0.20 ha)

Don Pugnetti Park is a 0.5-acre (0.20 ha) public park in Tacoma, Washington, in the United States. Located at the intersection of Pacific Avenue and South 21st Street in downtown Tacoma, the park is named after Donald A. Pugnetti and is owned by the Washington State Department of Transportation. It has landscaping and seating, and is maintained by the City of Tacoma.

The park has been the site of an Occupy Wall Street encampment (2011 to 2012) and other demonstrations. In 2020, protesters gathered there to protest the murder of George Floyd.
