= Old Tacoma, Tacoma, Washington =

Coordinates: 47°16′29.1″N 122°28′0.9″W

Old Tacoma is a neighborhood of the north end of Tacoma, Washington, more commonly known as Old Town.

== History ==
Old Town owes its name to the fact that it was the location of the original settlement called "Tacoma". In 1865, Job Carr built a cabin near the shore in anticipation of future land speculation due to the construction of the Transcontinental Railroad. The original cabin location is marked by a plaque at the base of Carr Street. Job Carr Cabin Museum is a replica of the original, and is situated in Old Town Park. Old Town was sustained in its early days by fishing and lumber mills.

== Geography ==
Old Town was originally a separate community from what is now downtown Tacoma, which was at first called "New Tacoma" before the two communities merged into one.

Today the area features an historical park and a range of restaurants and shops. It is also home to two buildings on the National Historic Registry: St. Peter's Church, the first church built in Tacoma and now Tacoma's oldest existing building, and Slavonian Hall. The area is sometimes called Ruston Way, although the Ruston Way waterside walk spans far beyond the accepted bounds of Old Tacoma.
