= Frost Park =

Park in Tacoma, Washington, U.S.

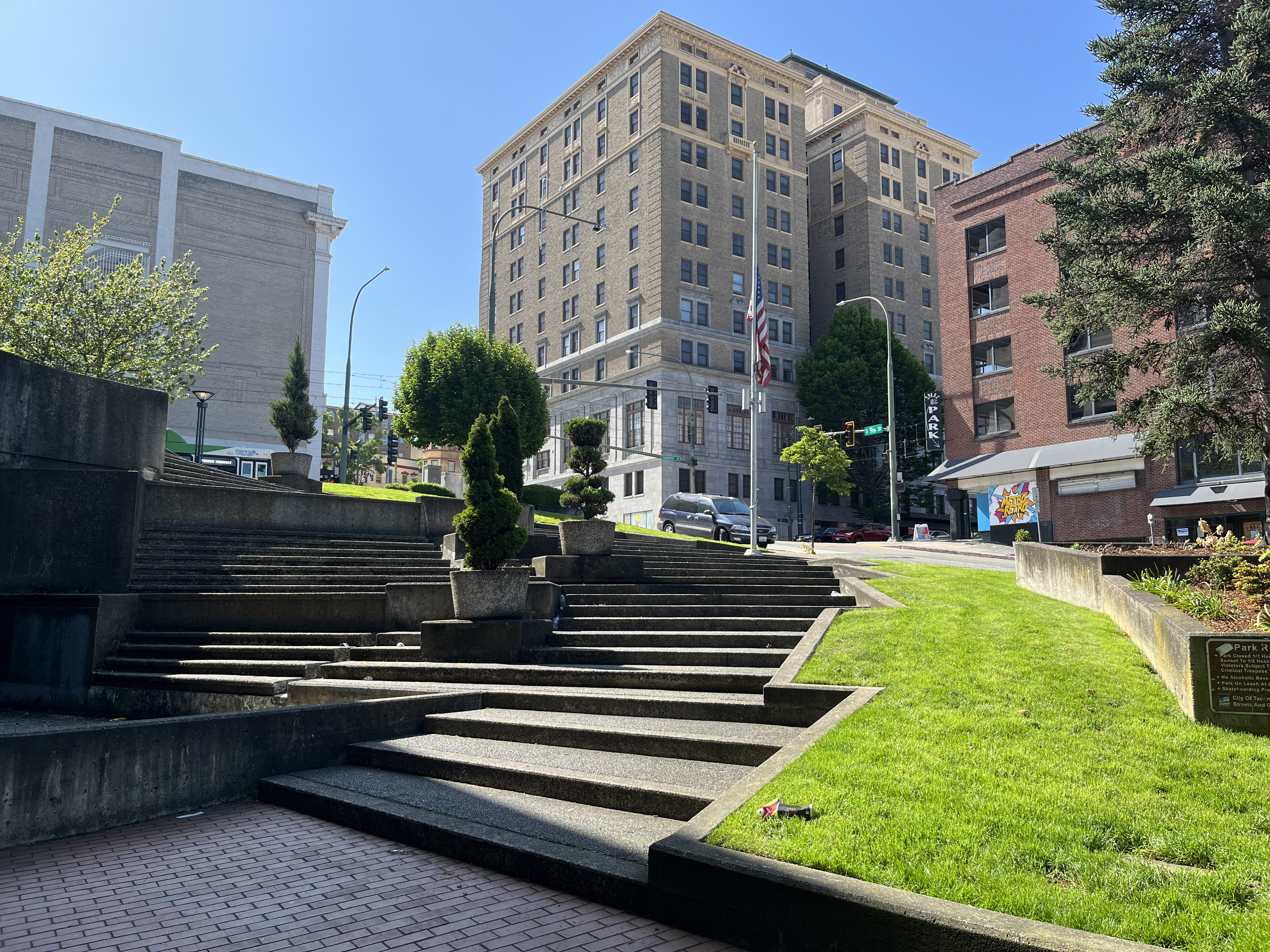
- Interactive map of Frost Park
- Location: Tacoma, Washington, United States
- Coordinates: 47°15′19″N 122°26′22″W

Frost Park (officially Larry L. Frost Memorial Park) is a public park in Tacoma, Washington. Named after police officer Larry Frost, the park is located at the intersection of South Ninth Street and Pacific Avenue in downtown Tacoma. Frost Park has a fountain and hosts chalk art competitions.

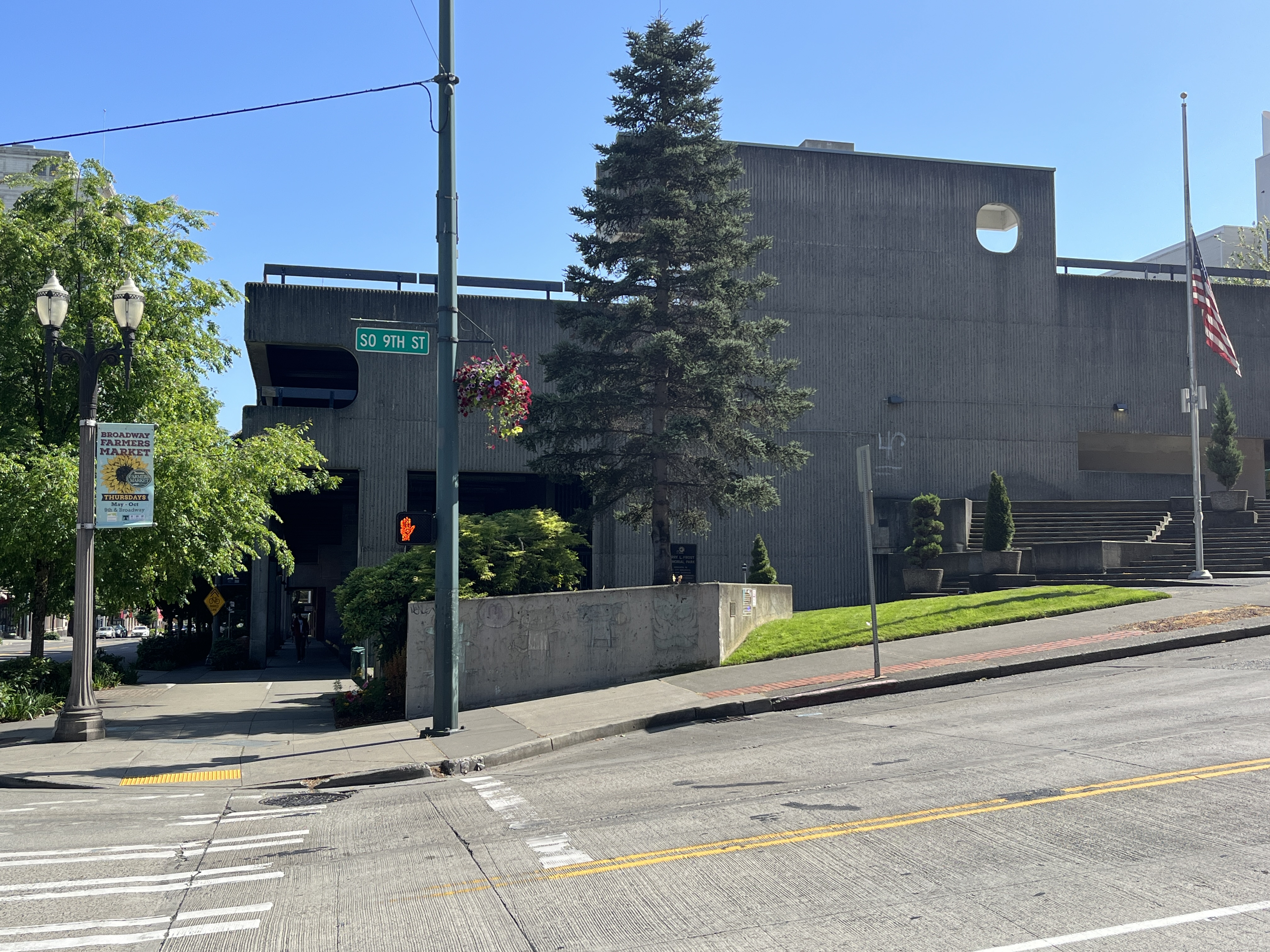

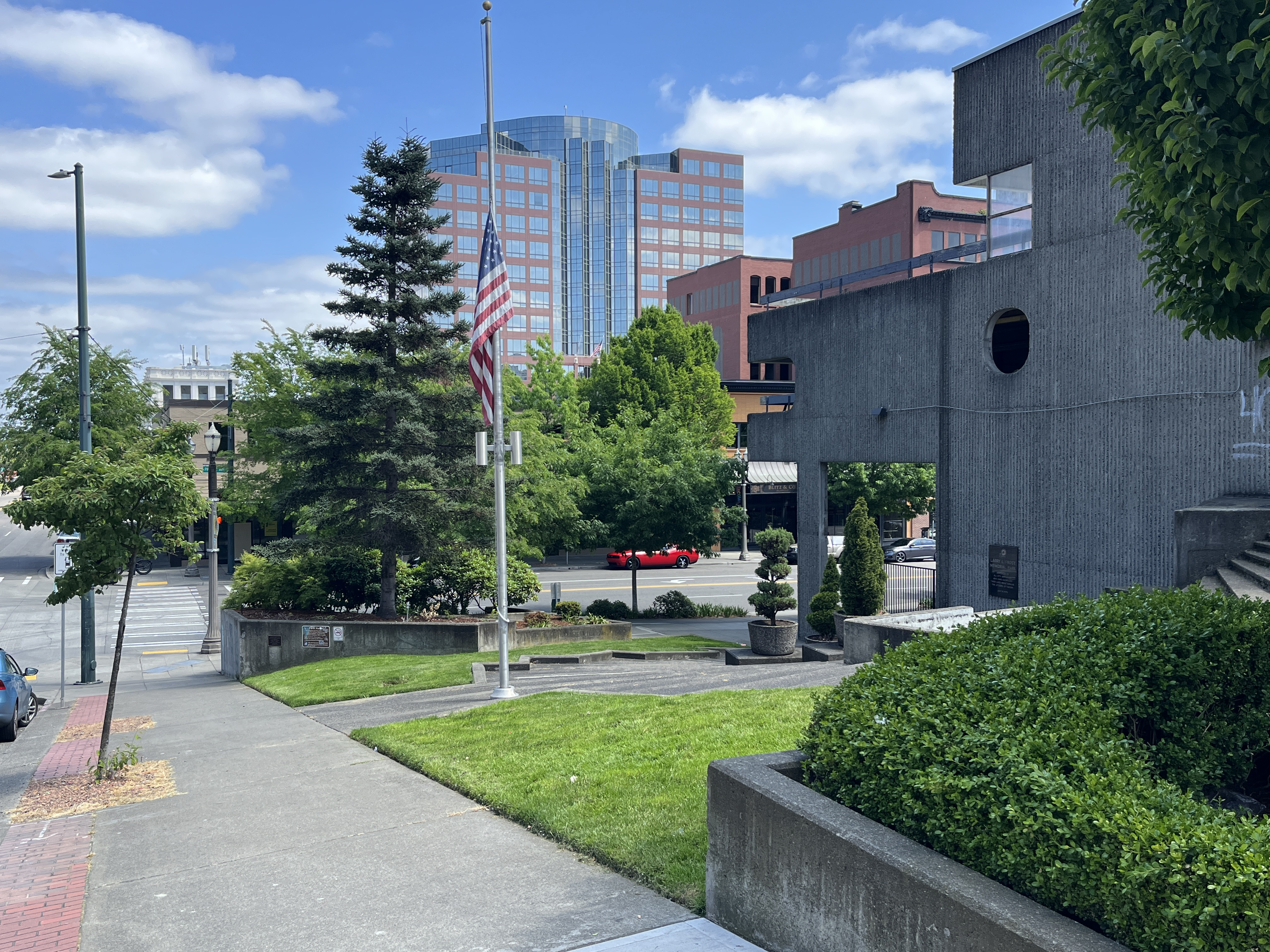
