= J. W. Cloes =

American politician

Dr. J. W. Cloes
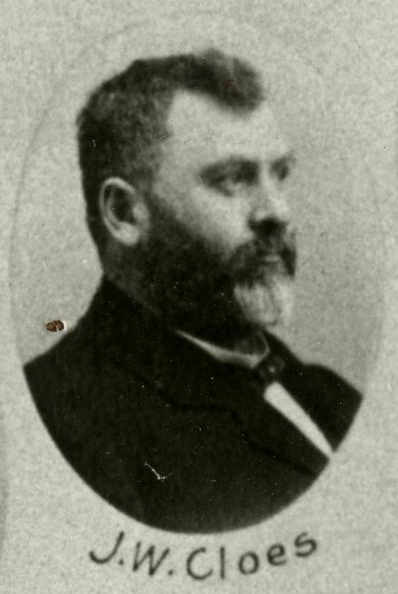
- Cloes in 1895

Member of the Washington House of Representatives for the 37th district
- In office 1907–1909

Member of the Washington House of Representatives for the 35th district
- In office 1895–1897

Personal details
- Born: July 26, 1850 Cleveland, Ohio, United States
- Died: April 7, 1919 (aged 68) Tacoma, Washington, United States
- Party: Republican

James W. Cloes (July 26, 1850 – April 7, 1919) was an American politician in the state of Washington. He served in the Washington House of Representatives.
