= Ruston Way, Tacoma, Washington =

Ruston Way is a neighborhood on the west shore of Commencement Bay in the north end of Tacoma, Washington. The two-mile long shoreline paralleling the BNSF tracks and Ruston Way is the focal point. It comprises several parks, public docks (Old Town Dock, Les Davis Pier), and numerous restaurants and office buildings. The Tacoma Fallen Firefighters Memorial, a 9/11 memorial, and the historic Fireboat No. 1 are all near the center of the long Ruston Way waterfront. A popular paved multi-use trail extends from Chinese Reconciliation Park on the south end (where Schuster Parkway transfers to Ruston Way at Old Town) to the 97-acre Point Ruston residential and commercial development to the north. The city boundary between Tacoma and Ruston cuts through Point Ruston, but the trail continues north toward the Tacoma Yacht Club.

== Parks ==
- Chinese Reconciliation Park. A 4-acre waterfront park that features traditional Chinese gardens and the Fuzhou Ting (pagoda). It memorializes the forced expulsion of Chinese residents from Tacoma in 1885. The Ting was completed in 2011.
- Jack Hyde Park. Old Town Dock was owned by the City of Tacoma before World War I. The city bought much of the land within the current park from the Tacoma Boatbuilding Company in 1972, and purchased two additional adjacent land parcels in 1973 and 1976.
- Hamilton Park. A small park with a grassy strip, a few tables, a narrow beach, and access to a public dock adjacent to a waterfront hotel.
- Dickman Mill Park. Metro Parks acquired the site of the former Dickman Lumber Mill (which closed in 1974 after about 80 years of operation). The land was redeveloped as a city park but retained several concrete foundations from the old mill.
- Marine Park. The park includes several long grassy fields, picnic tables, and water access for scuba divers.
