= Tacoma, Washington =

Tacoma
- City
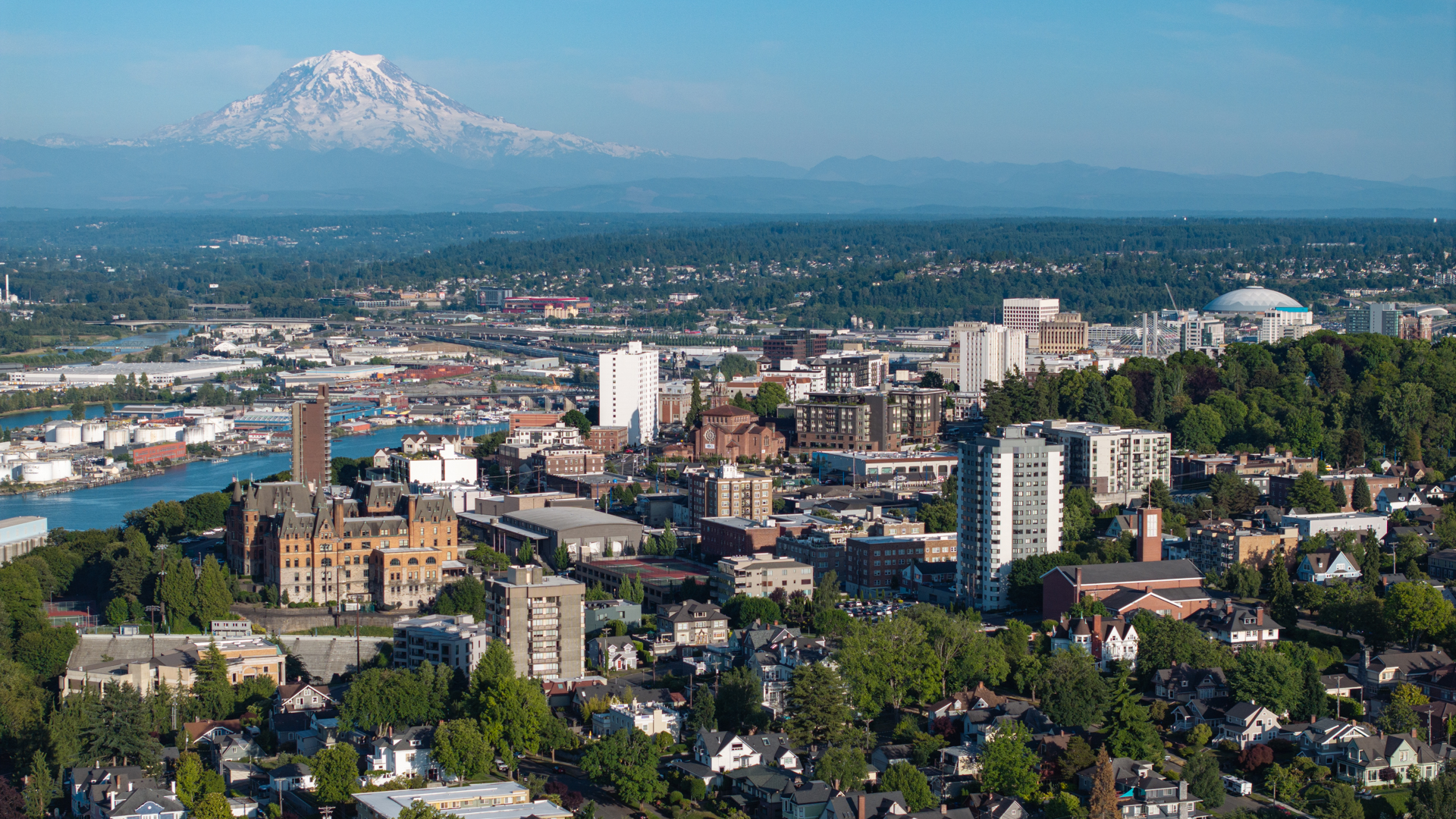
- Aerial view of Downtown Tacoma with Mount Rainier in the background

- Flag Seal
- Nicknames: City of Destiny, Grit City
- Interactive map of Tacoma
- Location within Washington (state) Location within the United States
- Coordinates: 47°14′45″N 122°27′34″W
- Country: United States
- State: Washington
- County: Pierce
- Adopted: 1868
- Founded: 1872
- Incorporated: November 12, 1875
- Named for: Tahoma

Government
  - Type: Council–manager
  - Mayor: Anders Ibsen (D)

Area
  - City: 62.42 sq mi (161.68 km^{2})
  - Land: 49.71 sq mi (128.76 km^{2})
  - Water: 12.71 sq mi (32.92 km^{2})
- Elevation: 387 ft (118 m)

Population (2020)
  - City: 219,346
  - Estimate (2025): 229,816
  - Rank: US: 104th WA: 3rd
  - Density: 4,412.1/sq mi (1,703.53/km^{2})
  - Urban: 3,544,011 (Seattle urban area) (US: 13th)
  - Metro: 4,034,248 (Seattle metropolitan area) (US: 15th)
- Demonym: Tacoman (plural: Tacomans)
- Time zone: UTC–8 (Pacific (PST))
  - Summer (DST): UTC–7 (PDT)
- ZIP codes: Zip codes: 98401–98409, 98411–98413, 98415–98419, 98421–98422, 98424, 98430–98431, 98433, 98438–98439, 98443–98448, 98464–98467, 98471, 98481, 98490, 98493, 98496–98499
- Area code: 253
- FIPS code: 53-70000
- GNIS feature ID: 2412025
- Website: tacoma.gov

Tacoma (/təˈkoʊmə/ tə-KOH-mə) is a city in and the county seat of Pierce County, Washington, United States. A port city, it is situated along Puget Sound roughly 30 miles (48 km) from Seattle and Olympia, and 58 miles (93 km) northwest of Mount Rainier National Park. Tacoma is the second-largest city in the Puget Sound area and the third-most populous city in the state with a population of 219,346 at the 2020 census. Tacoma is the economic and cultural center of the South Sound region, which has a population of about 1 million.

Tacoma adopted its name after the nearby Mount Rainier, called təˡqʷuʔbəʔ in the Puget Sound Salish dialect, and "Takhoma" in an anglicized version. It is locally known as the "City of Destiny" because the area was chosen to be the western terminus of the Northern Pacific Railroad in the late 19th century. The decision of the railroad was influenced by Tacoma's neighboring deep-water harbor, Commencement Bay. By connecting the bay with the railroad, Tacoma's motto became "When rails meet sails". Commencement Bay serves the Port of Tacoma, a center of international trade on the Pacific Coast and Washington's largest port. The city gained notoriety in 1940 for the collapse of the Tacoma Narrows Bridge, which earned the nickname "Galloping Gertie" due to the vertical movement of the deck during windy conditions.

Like most industrial cities, Tacoma suffered a prolonged decline in the mid-20th century as a result of suburbanization and divestment. Since the 1990s, downtown Tacoma has experienced a period of revitalization. Developments in the downtown include the University of Washington Tacoma; the T Line (formerly Tacoma Link), the first modern electric light rail service in the state; the state's highest density of art and history museums; and a restored urban waterfront, the Thea Foss Waterway.

== History ==
=== Early history ===
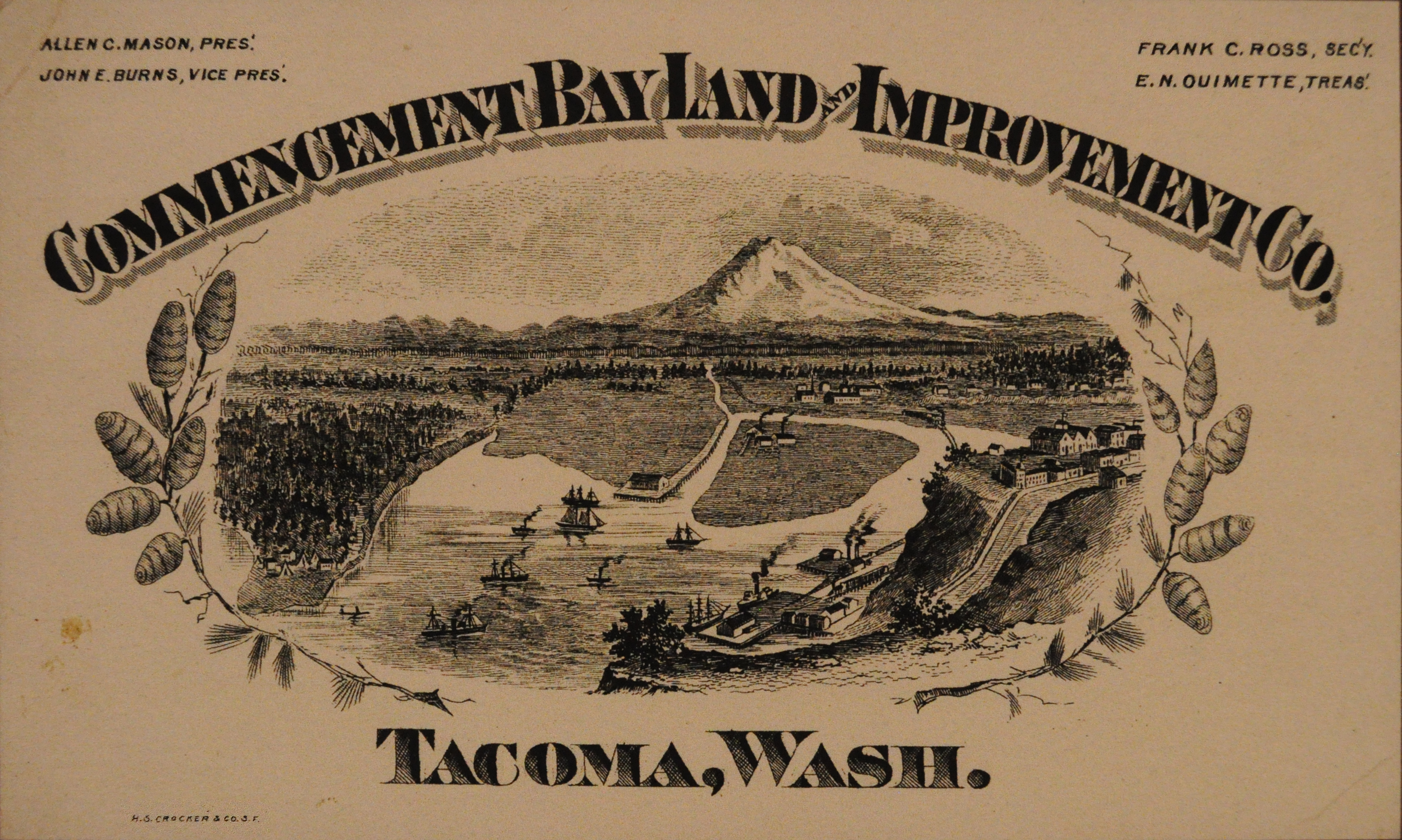
The Commencement Bay Land and Improvement Co. played a major role in the city's early growth.

The area was inhabited for thousands of years by Native Americans, most recently the Puyallup people, who lived in settlements on the delta. In 1852, Swedish immigrant Nicolas Delin built a water-powered sawmill on a creek near the head of Commencement Bay, but the small settlement that grew around it was abandoned during the Indian War of 1855–56. In 1864, pioneer and postmaster Job Carr, a Civil War veteran and land speculator, built a cabin (which also served as Tacoma's first post office; a replica was built in 2000 near the original site in "Old Town"). Carr hoped to profit from the selection of Commencement Bay as the terminus of the Transcontinental Railroad, and sold most of his claim to developer Morton M. McCarver (1807–1875), who named his project Tacoma City, derived from the indigenous name for the mountain.

Tacoma was incorporated on November 12, 1875, following its selection in 1873 as the western terminus of the Northern Pacific Railroad due to lobbying by McCarver, future mayor John Wilson Sprague, and others. However, the railroad built its depot in New Tacoma, two miles (3 km) south of the Carr–McCarver development. The two communities grew together and joined, merging on January 7, 1884. The transcontinental link was effected in 1887, and the population grew from 1,098 in 1880 to 36,006 in 1890. Rudyard Kipling visited Tacoma in 1889 and said it was "literally staggering under a boom of the boomiest".

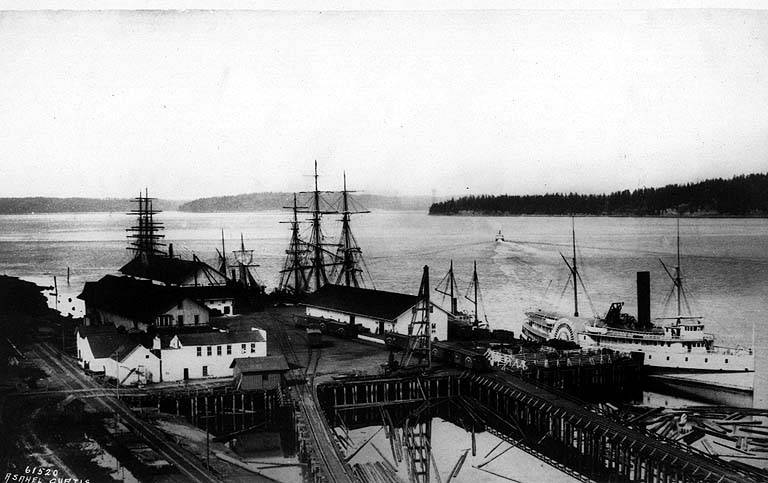
Sidewheel steamer Alaskan at the Northern Pacific Dock c. 1880

In November 1885, white citizens led by then-mayor Jacob Weisbach expelled several hundred Chinese residents peacefully living in the city. As described by the account prepared by the Chinese Reconciliation Project Foundation, on the morning of November 3, "several hundred men, led by the mayor and other city officials, evicted the Chinese from their homes, corralled them at 7th Street and Pacific Avenue, marched them to the railway station at Lakeview and forced them aboard the morning train to Portland, Oregon. The next day two Chinese settlements were burned to the ground."

George Francis Train was a resident for a few years in the late 19th century. In 1890, he staged a global circumnavigation starting and ending in Tacoma to promote the city. A plaque in downtown Tacoma marks the start and finish line. The discovery of gold in the Klondike in 1898 led to Tacoma's prominence in the region being eclipsed by the development of Seattle. A major tragedy marred the end of the 19th century, when a streetcar accident resulted in significant loss of life on July 4, 1900.

=== Early 20th century ===
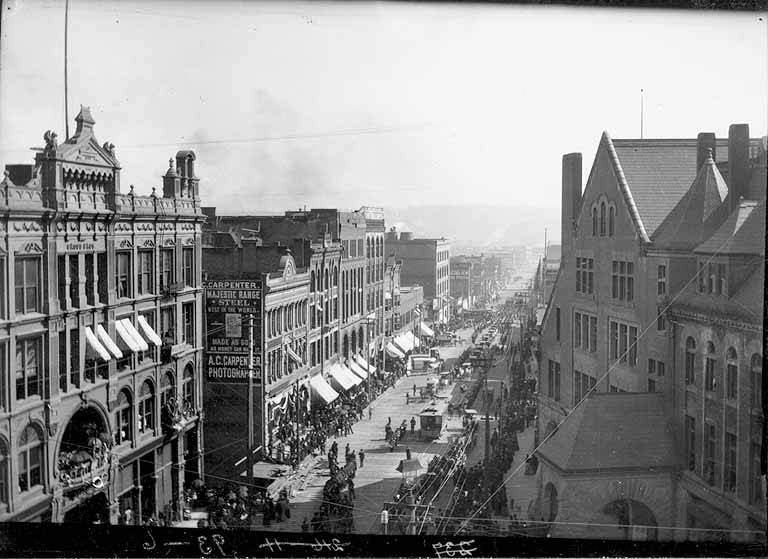
Odd Fellows Parade at C Street and 9th Street, 1893

From May to August 1907, the city was the site of a smelter workers' strike organized by Local 545 of the Industrial Workers of the World (IWW), with the goal of a fifty-cent per day pay raise. The strike was strongly opposed by the local business community, and the smelter owners threatened to blacklist organizers and union officials. The IWW opposed this move by trying to persuade inbound workers to avoid Tacoma during the strike. By August, the strike had ended without meeting its demands.

Tacoma was briefly (1915–1922) a major destination for big-time automobile racing, with one of the nation's top-rated racing venues just outside the city limits, at the site of today's Clover Park Technical College.

In 1924, Tacoma's first movie studio, H. C. Weaver Studio, was sited at present-day Titlow Beach. At the time, it was the third-largest freestanding film production space in America, with the two larger facilities being located in Hollywood. The production studio was also the first of its kind in the Pacific Northwest The first film produced in Tacoma was Hearts and Fists, which starred John Bowers and premiered at Tacoma's Rialto Theater. The studio's importance has undergone a revival with the discovery of one of its most famous lost films, Eyes of the Totem. In 1932, the studios burned to the ground in a mysterious fire, and the production facility was never rebuilt. Several films were destroyed in the fire as old nitrate-based film did not survive.

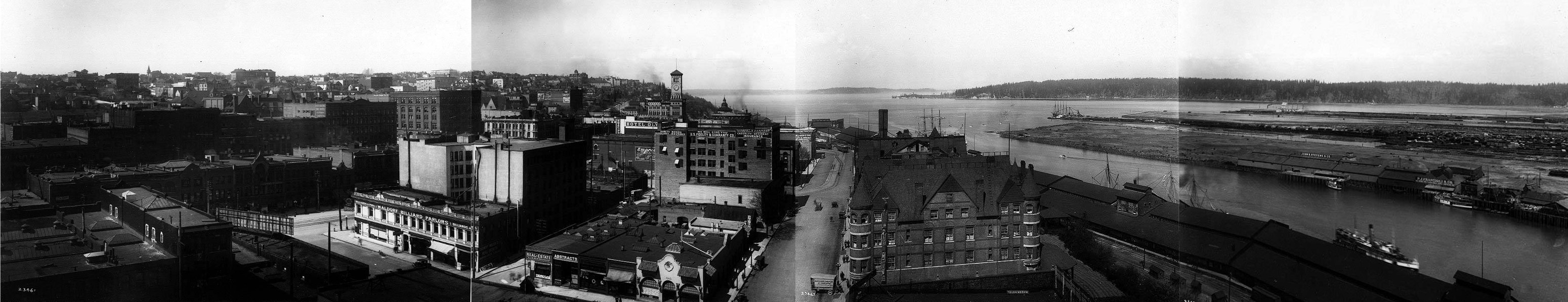
Tacoma manufacturing district and tide flats, 1912.

=== Great Depression ===
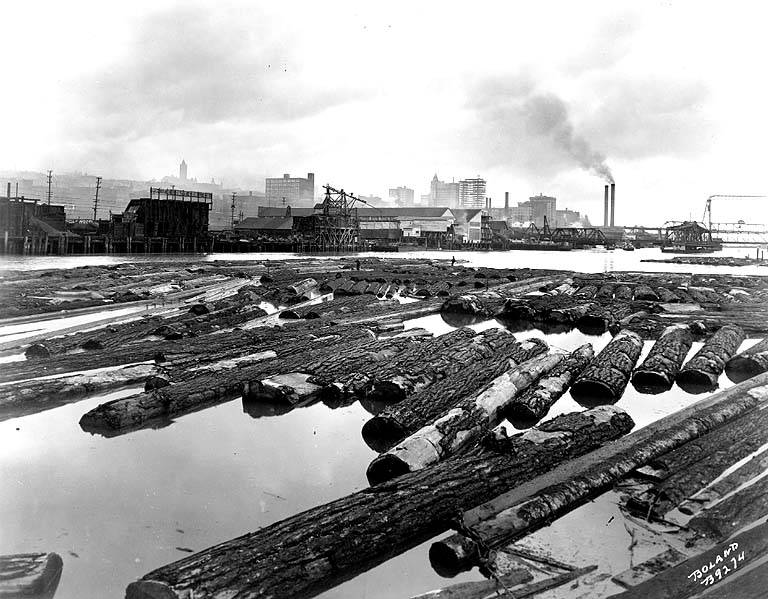
Tacoma harbor pictured in 1925

The 1929 crash of the stock market, resulting in the Great Depression, was only the first event in a series of misfortunes to hit Tacoma in the winter of 1929–30. In one of the coldest winters on record, Tacoma experienced mass power outages and eventually the shutdown of major power supply dams, leaving the city without sufficient power and heat. During the 30-day power shortage in the winter of 1929 and 1930, the engines of the aircraft carrier USS Lexington provided Tacoma with electricity.

A power grid failure paired with a newly rewritten city constitution – put into place to keep political power away from a single entity such as the railroad – created a standstill in the ability to further the local economy. Local businesses were affected as the sudden stop of loans limited progression of expansion and renewal funds for maintenance, leading to foreclosures. Families across the city experienced the fallout of economic depression as breadwinners sought to provide for their families. Shanty-town politics began to develop as the destitute needed some form of leadership to keep the peace.

==== Hooverville ====
At the intersection of Dock Street EXD and East D Street in the train yard, a shanty town became the solution to the growing scar of the depression. Tacoma's Hooverville grew in 1924 as the homeless community settled on the waterfront. The population boomed in November 1930 through early 1931 as families from the neighboring McKinley and Hilltop areas were evicted.

Collecting scraps of metal and wood from local lumber stores and recycling centers, families began building shanties (shacks) for shelter. By 1934, alcoholism and suicide were a common event in the Hooverville that eventually led to its nickname of "Hollywood on the Tide Flats", because of the Hollywood-style crimes and events taking place in the camp.

In 1935, Tacoma received national attention when George Weyerhaeuser, the nine-year-old son of prominent lumber industry executive J.P. Weyerhaeuser, was kidnapped while walking home from school. FBI agents from Portland handled the case, in which a ransom of $200,000 secured the release of the victim. Four persons were apprehended and convicted; the last to be released was paroled from McNeil Island in 1963. George Weyerhaeuser went on to become chairman of the board of the Weyerhaeuser Company.

In 1940, after eviction notices failed, the police department attempted to burn down Hooverville. In 1956, the last occupant of "Hollywood" was evicted and the police used fire to level the grounds and make room for industrial growth.

=== Postwar era ===
In 1951, an investigation by a state legislative committee revealed widespread corruption in Tacoma's government, which had been organized commission-style since 1910. Voters approved a mayor and city-manager system in 1952.

Tacoma was featured prominently in the garage rock sound of the mid-1960s with bands including The Wailers and The Sonics. The surf rock band The Ventures were also from Tacoma.

Downtown Tacoma experienced a long decline through the mid-20th century. Harold Moss, later the city's mayor, characterized late-1970s Tacoma as looking "bombed out" like "downtown Beirut" (a reference to the Lebanese Civil War that occurred at that time); "Streets were abandoned, storefronts were abandoned and City Hall was the headstone and Union Station the footstone" on the grave of downtown.

The first local referendums in the U.S. on computerized voting occurred in Tacoma in 1982 and 1987. On both occasions, voters rejected the computer voting systems that local officials sought to purchase. The campaigns, organized by Eleanora Ballasiotes, a conservative Republican, focused on the vulnerabilities of computers to fraud.

In 1998, Tacoma installed Click! Network, a high-speed fiber optic network throughout the community. The municipally owned power company, Tacoma Power, wired the city. In response, the State of Washington passed RCW 54.16.330 in 2000, effectively preventing further research and development of Click! Network until its repeal in 2021 during the COVID-19 pandemic, a period of over 20 years.

=== Downtown revival ===
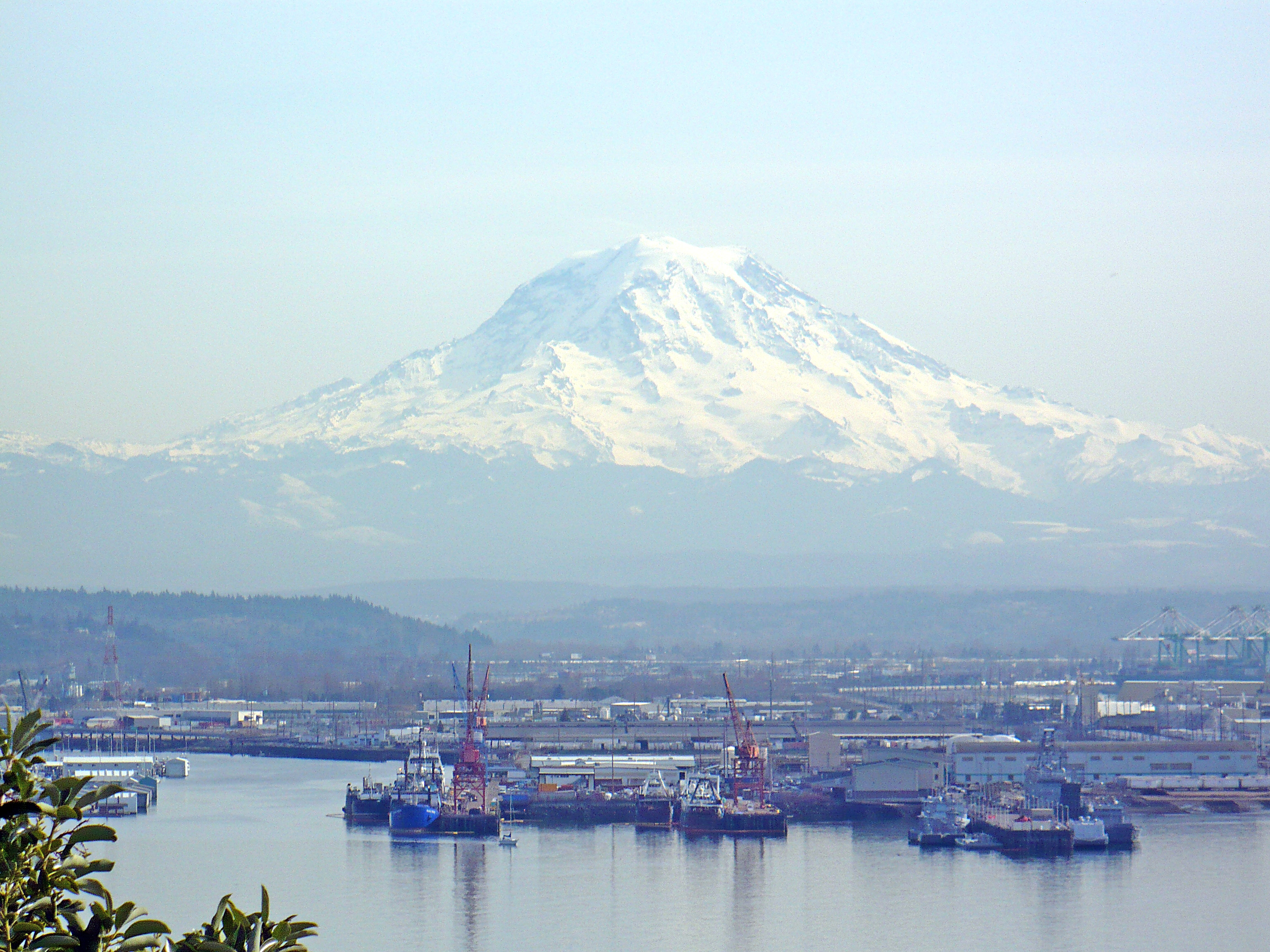
View of Mount Rainier and the Port of Tacoma from Browns Point

Beginning in the early 1990s, city residents and planners took steps to revitalize Tacoma, particularly its downtown. Among the projects were the federal courthouse in the former Union Station (1991); Save Our Station community group; Merritt+Pardini Architect (1991); Reed & Stem Architects (1911); the adaptation of a group of century-old brick warehouses into a branch campus of the University of Washington; the numerous privately financed renovation projects near the campus; the Washington State History Museum (1996), echoing the architecture of Union Station; the Museum of Glass (2002); the Tacoma Art Museum (2003); and the region's first light-rail line (2003). The glass and steel Greater Tacoma Convention Center opened in November 2004. America's Car Museum was completed in late 2011 near the Tacoma Dome.

The Pantages Theater (first opened in 1918) anchors downtown Tacoma's Theatre District. Tacoma Arts Live manages the Pantages, the Rialto Theater, and the Theatre on the Square. Tacoma Little Theatre (opened in 1918) is northwest of downtown in the Stadium District. Other attractions include the Grand Cinema, McMenamins Elks Temple, and the Landmark Temple Theatre.

== Geography ==
Tacoma has an official elevation of 381 feet (116 m), varying between sea level and about 500 feet (150 m).

According to the United States Census Bureau, the city has an area of 62.34 square miles (161.46 km^{2}), of which 49.72 square miles (128.77 km^{2}) is land and 12.62 square miles (32.69 km^{2}) is water.

Tacoma straddles the neighboring Commencement Bay with several smaller cities surrounding it. Large areas of Tacoma have views of Mount Rainier. In the event of a major eruption of Mount Rainier, the low-lying areas of Tacoma near the Port of Tacoma are at risk from a lahar flowing down the Puyallup River.

The city is several miles north of Joint Base Lewis–McChord, formerly known separately as Fort Lewis and McChord Air Force Base.

=== Architecture ===
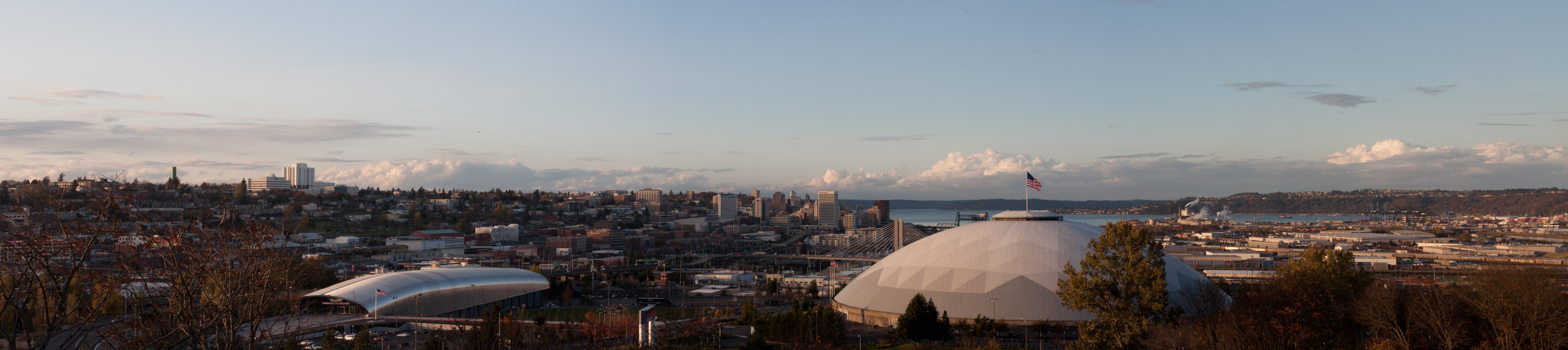
Panorama of Tacoma from the McKinley neighborhood with the Tacoma Dome in the foreground and Puget Sound in the background

Tacoma is home to numerous architectural landmarks and was shaped by prominent architects such as Everett Phipps Babcock, Frederick Heath, Ambrose J. Russell, and Silas E. Nelsen. The city features two suspension bridges, the Tacoma Narrows Bridge, that connect Tacoma to Gig Harbor and the Kitsap Peninsula. The collapse of the original bridge in 1940 remains a well-known case study in engineering and design. Tacoma's historic preservation program oversees 165 city landmarks and more than 1,000 historic properties within five overlay zones. Several structures are listed on local, state, and national historic registers, including Engine House No. 9 (now a pub and microbrewery), Fireboat No. 1, and the William Ross Rust House.

Other notable sites include the Murray Morgan Bridge, a 1911 steel lift bridge across the Thea Foss Waterway, the National Realty Building, Lincoln High School, Rhodes House, Pythian Temple, Perkins Building, Tacoma Dome, and Rhodesleigh. The Luzon Building and Nihon Go Gakko school house have been demolished, and the MV Kalakala was scrapped in early 2015. University of Puget Sound, Cushman Dam No. 1, Cushman Dam No. 2, Rialto Theater, and Union Station are also noteworthy.

=== Neighborhoods ===
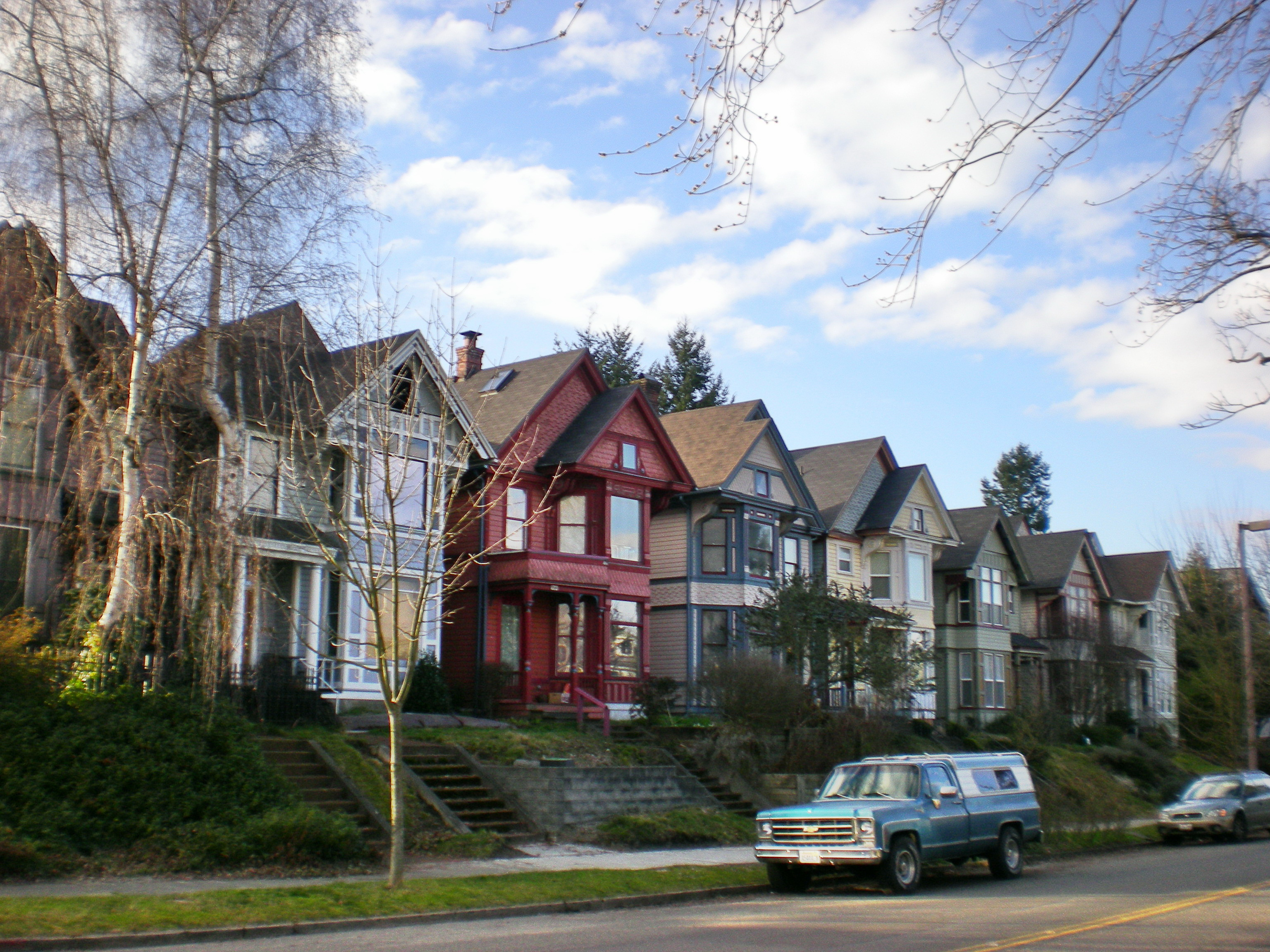
Houses on South J Street in the Hilltop neighborhood

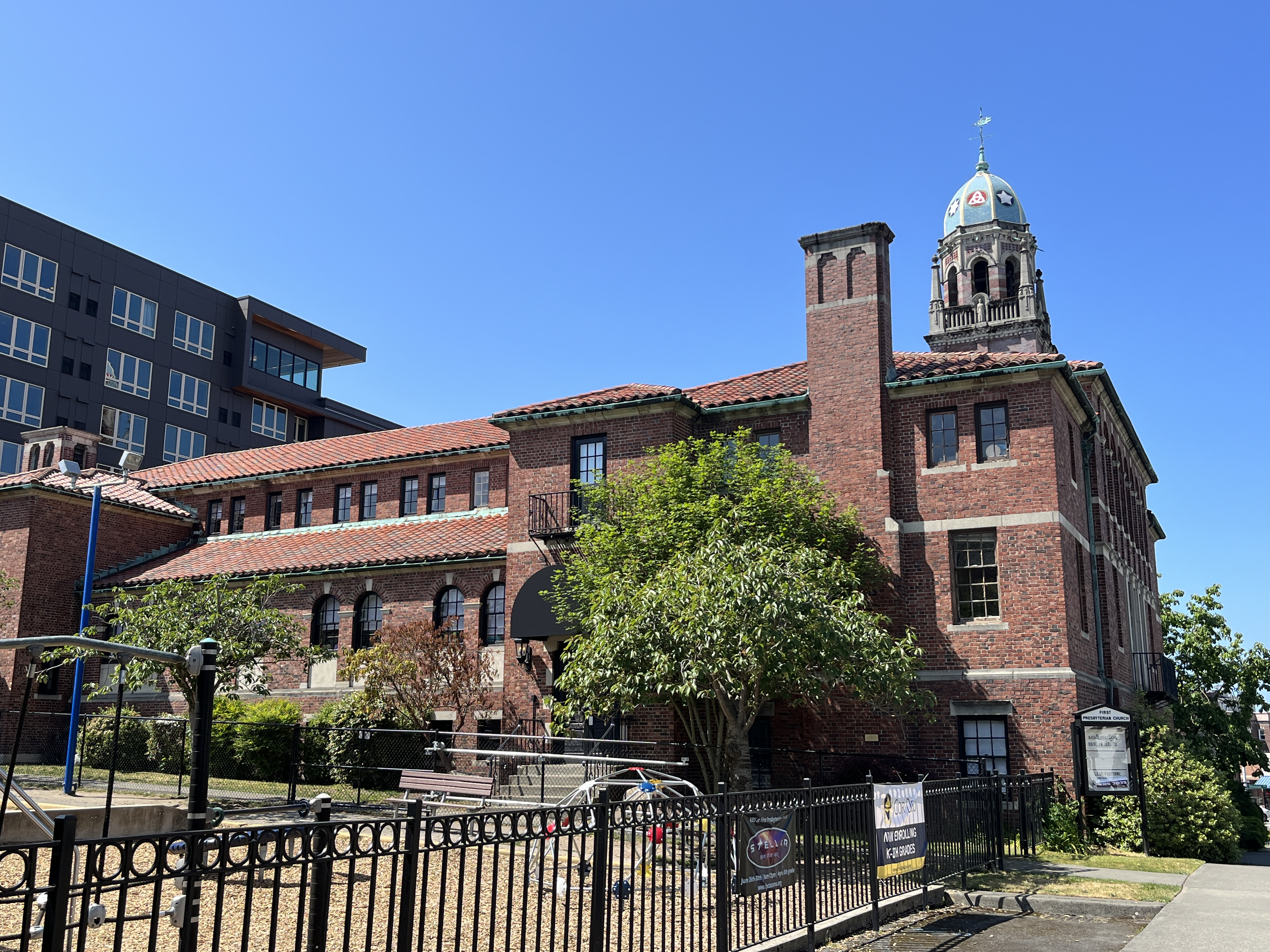
The First Presbyterian Church in the Stadium District

- Central Tacoma
  - Hilltop (shared with Downtown)
  - Delong Park
  - The Wedge
  - McCarver (shared with New Tacoma/Downtown)
  - Bryant
  - College Heights
- New Tacoma
  - Downtown Tacoma
    - St. Helens Neighborhood
    - Theater District
    - Central Business District
    - Warehouse/Brewery District
    - Thea Foss Waterway
    - The McCarver Neighborhood (shared with Central Tacoma/Hilltop)
    - Stadium District (shared with North Tacoma)
    - Dome District
- Nalley Valley
- Port of Tacoma
- East Tacoma
  - McKinley Hill
  - Salishan
  - Hillsdale
  - Swan Creek
  - Strawberry Hill
- North Tacoma
  - College Park
  - North Slope
  - Old Tacoma
  - Proctor District
  - Ruston (separately incorporated)
  - Ruston Way
  - Sixth Ave District Tacoma, Washington
  - Skyline
  - Stadium District (shared with Downtown)
  - Westgate (shared with West Tacoma)
  - Yakima Hill
- Northeast Tacoma
  - Browns Point (unincorporated)
  - Crescent Heights
- South End
  - Fern Hill
  - Lincoln International District
  - Wapato
  - Excelsior
  - Stewart Heights
  - Larchmont
- South Tacoma
  - Edison
  - South Park
  - Manitou
  - Oakland/Madrona
  - Tacoma Mall
- West Tacoma
  - Highlands
  - Narrows
  - Titlow
  - Salmon Beach
  - Westgate (shared with North Tacoma)

=== Climate ===
According to the Köppen climate classification, Tacoma has a warm-summer Mediterranean climate (Köppen Csb). The warmest months are July and August; the coldest month is December.

Climate data for Tacoma, Washington (1991–2020 normals, extremes 1982–present)
Month	Jan	Feb	Mar	Apr	May	Jun	Jul	Aug	Sep	Oct	Nov	Dec	Year
Record high °F (°C)	66 (19)	68 (20)	77 (25)	83 (28)	92 (33)	105 (41)	94 (34)	96 (36)	89 (32)	82 (28)	70 (21)	68 (20)	105 (41)
Mean maximum °F (°C)	58.2 (14.6)	58.8 (14.9)	66.1 (18.9)	72.6 (22.6)	79.8 (26.6)	83.0 (28.3)	86.7 (30.4)	87.4 (30.8)	80.6 (27.0)	70.8 (21.6)	62.6 (17.0)	58.2 (14.6)	89.4 (31.9)
Mean daily maximum °F (°C)	48.1 (8.9)	50.3 (10.2)	54.7 (12.6)	59.8 (15.4)	66.5 (19.2)	71.1 (21.7)	76.8 (24.9)	76.9 (24.9)	70.7 (21.5)	60.7 (15.9)	52.4 (11.3)	47.3 (8.5)	61.3 (16.3)
Daily mean °F (°C)	42.8 (6.0)	43.9 (6.6)	47.4 (8.6)	51.8 (11.0)	57.8 (14.3)	62.2 (16.8)	67.0 (19.4)	66.9 (19.4)	61.9 (16.6)	53.7 (12.1)	46.5 (8.1)	42.1 (5.6)	53.7 (12.1)
Mean daily minimum °F (°C)	37.4 (3.0)	37.4 (3.0)	40.1 (4.5)	43.7 (6.5)	49.1 (9.5)	53.4 (11.9)	57.2 (14.0)	57.0 (13.9)	53.0 (11.7)	46.6 (8.1)	40.5 (4.7)	36.9 (2.7)	46.0 (7.8)
Mean minimum °F (°C)	25.6 (−3.6)	27.2 (−2.7)	31.2 (−0.4)	35.4 (1.9)	41.3 (5.2)	47.0 (8.3)	50.9 (10.5)	50.1 (10.1)	44.6 (7.0)	35.7 (2.1)	28.2 (−2.1)	25.7 (−3.5)	21.9 (−5.6)
Record low °F (°C)	17 (−8)	11 (−12)	15 (−9)	29 (−2)	34 (1)	37 (3)	46 (8)	41 (5)	34 (1)	26 (−3)	5 (−15)	6 (−14)	5 (−15)
Average precipitation inches (mm)	6.03 (153)	4.03 (102)	4.38 (111)	3.39 (86)	2.00 (51)	1.42 (36)	0.55 (14)	0.83 (21)	1.57 (40)	4.09 (104)	6.50 (165)	6.02 (153)	40.81 (1,037)
Average precipitation days (≥ 0.01 in)	19.5	15.9	17.4	14.7	10.6	8.3	3.4	3.9	7.0	14.3	19.5	20.4	154.9
Mean monthly sunshine hours	64	113	186	210	248	270	310	279	210	155	60	62	2,167
Mean daily sunshine hours	2	4	6	7	8	9	10	9	7	5	2	2	6
Percentage possible sunshine	22	39	50	51	53	57	65	63	56	46	22	23	46
Source: NOAA, The Weather Channel, and Weather Atlas (sun and uv)

== Demographics ==
Historical population
Census	Pop.	Note	%±
1870	73		—
1880	1,098		1,404.1%
1890	36,006		3,179.2%
1900	37,714		4.7%
1910	83,743		122.0%
1920	96,965		15.8%
1930	106,817		10.2%
1940	109,408		2.4%
1950	143,673		31.3%
1960	147,979		3.0%
1970	154,407		4.3%
1980	158,501		2.7%
1990	176,664		11.5%
2000	193,556		9.6%
2010	198,397		2.5%
2020	219,346		10.6%
2024 (est.)	229,816		4.8%
source: U.S. Decennial Census; 2020 Census

=== Racial and ethnic composition ===
Tacoma, Washington – Racial and ethnic composition Note: the US Census treats Hispanic/Latino as an ethnic category. This table excludes Latinos from the racial categories and assigns them to a separate category. Hispanics/Latinos may be of any race.
Race / Ethnicity (NH = Non-Hispanic)	Pop 2000	Pop 2010	Pop 2020	% 2000	% 2010	% 2020
White alone (NH)	128,696	119,981	120,118	66.49%	60.48%	54.76%
Black or African American alone (NH)	21,187	21,222	21,708	10.95%	10.70%	9.90%
Native American or Alaska Native alone (NH)	3,398	2,988	2,910	1.76%	1.51%	1.33%
Asian alone (NH)	14,508	16,013	19,932	7.50%	8.07%	9.09%
Pacific Islander alone (NH)	1,740	2,358	4,174	0.90%	1.19%	1.90%
Other race alone (NH)	504	394	1,399	0.26%	0.20%	0.64%
Mixed Race or Multi-Racial (NH)	10,261	13,051	20,090	5.30%	6.58%	9.16%
Hispanic or Latino (any race)	13,262	22,390	29,015	6.85%	11.29%	13.23%
Total	193,556	198,397	219,346	100.00%	100.00%	100.00%

=== 2020 census ===
As of the 2020 census, Tacoma had a population of 219,346. The median age was 36.9 years. 20.1% of residents were under the age of 18 and 14.5% of residents were 65 years of age or older. For every 100 females there were 96.9 males, and for every 100 females age 18 and over there were 95.2 males age 18 and over.

100.0% of residents lived in urban areas, while 0.0% lived in rural areas.

There were 87,221 households in Tacoma, of which 26.8% had children under the age of 18 living in them. Of all households, 38.0% were married-couple households, 21.8% were households with a male householder and no spouse or partner present, and 30.5% were households with a female householder and no spouse or partner present. About 32.0% of all households were made up of individuals and 10.8% had someone living alone who was 65 years of age or older.

There were 92,309 housing units, of which 5.5% were vacant. The homeowner vacancy rate was 1.2% and the rental vacancy rate was 5.7%.

Racial composition as of the 2020 census
Race	Number	Percent
White	125,980	57.4%
Black or African American	22,666	10.3%
American Indian and Alaska Native	3,942	1.8%
Asian	20,268	9.2%
Native Hawaiian and Other Pacific Islander	4,301	2.0%
Some other race	13,776	6.3%
Two or more races	28,413	13.0%
Hispanic or Latino (of any race)	29,015	13.2%

=== 2010 census ===
As of the 2010 census, there were 198,397 people, 78,541 households, and 45,716 families residing in the city. The population density was 3,864.9 inhabitants per square mile (1,492.2/km^{2}). There were 81,102 housing units at an average density of 1,619.4 per square mile (625.3/km^{2}). The racial makeup of the city was 64.9% White (60.5% Non-Hispanic White), 12.2% African American, 8.2% Asian (2.1% Vietnamese, 1.6% Cambodian, 1.3% Korean, 1.3% Filipino, 0.4% Chinese, 0.4% Japanese, 0.2% Indian, 0.2% Laotian, 0.1% Thai), 1.8% Native American, 1.2% Pacific Islander (0.7% Samoan, 0.2% Guamanian, 0.1% Native Hawaiian), and 8.1% were from two or more races. Hispanic or Latino residents of any race were 11.3% of the population (8.1% Mexican, 1.1% Puerto Rican).

There were 78,541 households, of which 31.0% had children under the age of 18 living with them, 37.8% were married couples living together, 14.8% had a female householder with no spouse present, 5.6% had a male householder with no spouse present, and 41.8% were other families. 32.3% of all households were made up of individuals, and 9.6% had someone living alone who was 65 years of age or older. The average household size was 2.44 and the average family size was 3.10.

The median age in the city was 35.1 years. 23% of residents were under the age of 18; 10.9% were between the ages of 18 and 24; 29.6% were from 25 to 44; 25.3% were from 45 to 64; and 11.3% were 65 years of age or older. The gender makeup of the city was 49.4% male and 50.6% female.

=== 2000 census ===
As of the 2000 census, there were 193,556 people, 76,152 households, and 45,919 families residing in the city. The median income for a household in the city was $37,879, and the median income for a family was $45,567. Males had a median income of $35,820, versus $27,697 for females. The per capita income for the city was $19,130. About 11.4% of families and 15.9% of the population were below the poverty line, including 20.6% of those under the age of 18 and 10.9% of those 65 and older.

=== Crime ===
Tacoma
- Crime rates* (2022)

Violent crimes
- Homicide: 41
- Rape: 147
- Robbery: 752
- Aggravated assault: 2,661
- Total violent crime: 3,601

Property crimes
- Burglary: 2,365
- Larceny-theft: 11,027
- Motor vehicle theft: 5,582
- Arson: 243
- Total property crime: 19,217
- Note: Reported crimes per 100,000 population Source: 2022 FBI UCR Data

According to Uniform Crime Report statistics compiled by the Federal Bureau of Investigation (FBI) in 2022, there were 3,601 violent crimes and 19,217 property crimes, for 221,776 residents. Of these, the violent crimes consisted of 147 forcible rapes, 41 murders, 752 robberies and 2,661 aggravated assaults, while 2,365 burglaries, 11,027 larceny-thefts, 5,582 motor vehicle thefts and 243 instances of arson defined the property offenses.

Tacoma's Hilltop neighborhood struggled with crime in the 1980s and early 1990s. The beginning of the 21st century has seen a marked reduction in crime, while neighborhoods have enacted community policing and other policies.

Bill Baarsma (mayor, 2002–2010) was a member of the Mayors Against Illegal Guns Coalition, a bi-partisan group with the goal of "making the public safer by getting illegal guns off the streets".

Starting in 2020, during the pandemic, Tacoma's crime started to rise again. In 2022, the city of Tacoma had the highest number of murders in its recorded history, at 45 murders, which dropped to 34 in 2023.

== Economy ==
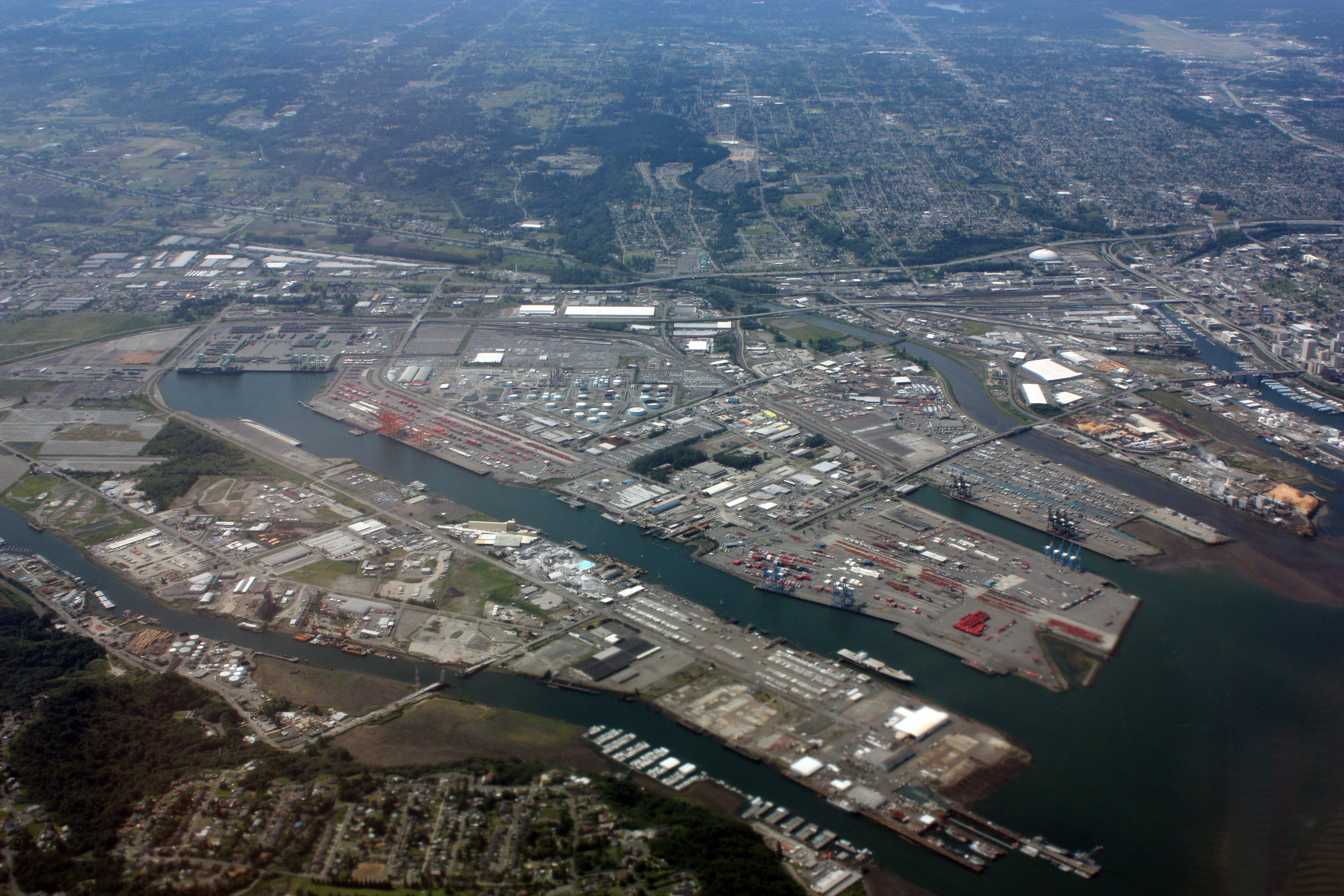
The Port of Tacoma on Commencement Bay is one of the largest seaports in the Pacific Northwest.

Tacoma is the home of several international companies, including staffing company True Blue Inc., lumber company Simpson, and the food companies Roman Meal and Brown and Haley. Frank C. Mars founded Mars, Incorporated, in 1911 in Tacoma.

Beginning in the 1930s, the city became known for the "Tacoma Aroma", a distinctive, acrid odor produced by pulp and paper manufacturing on the industrial tide flats. In the late 1990s, Simpson Tacoma Kraft reduced total sulfur emissions by 90%. This aroma is now eliminated following the mill's September 2023 closure.

U.S. Oil and Refining operates an oil refinery on the tide flats in the Port of Tacoma. Built 74 years ago in Tacoma in 1952, it refines 39,000 barrels of petroleum per day.

The Tacoma Mall is the largest shopping center in Tacoma. It is owned by Simon Property Group. Anchor tenants include JC Penney, Macy's, and Nordstrom.

An economic setback for the city occurred in September 2009 when Russell Investments, which had been in downtown Tacoma since its inception in 1936, announced it was moving its headquarters to Seattle along with several hundred white-collar jobs. A large regional office for State Farm occupied the building until 2018 when the building was purchased by the 909 Destiny Fund LLC. The building reopened as a multi-tenant Class A property. The anchor tenant is TOTE Alaska, which announced in 2019 that it would be relocating its Federal Way headquarters to the 909 A Street building's top two floors.

Hospitals in Tacoma are operated by MultiCare Health System and Franciscan Health System. Hospitals include MultiCare Tacoma General Hospital, Mary Bridge Children's Hospital, MultiCare Allenmore Hospital and St. Joseph Medical Center. The Tacoma–Pierce County Health Department manages public health initiatives across the city and county.

=== Top employers ===
According to the city's 2020 Comprehensive Annual Financial Report, the largest employers in the city are:

#	Employer	Type of Business	# of Employees	Percentage
1	Joint Base Lewis–McChord	Military	54,000	5.7%
2	MultiCare Health System	Health Care	8,264	0.9%
3	State of Washington	Government	7,859	0.8%
4	CHI Franciscan Health	Health Care	5,682	0.6%
5	Tacoma Public Schools	Education	3,649	0.4%
6	City of Tacoma	Government	3,623	0.4%
7	Pierce County	Government	3,304	0.3%
8	Puyallup School District	Education	2,711	0.3%
9	Bethel School District	Education	2,689	0.3%
10	Safeway and Albertsons	Retail Grocery	2,153	0.2%
—	Total employers	—	93,934	9.9%

== Arts and culture ==
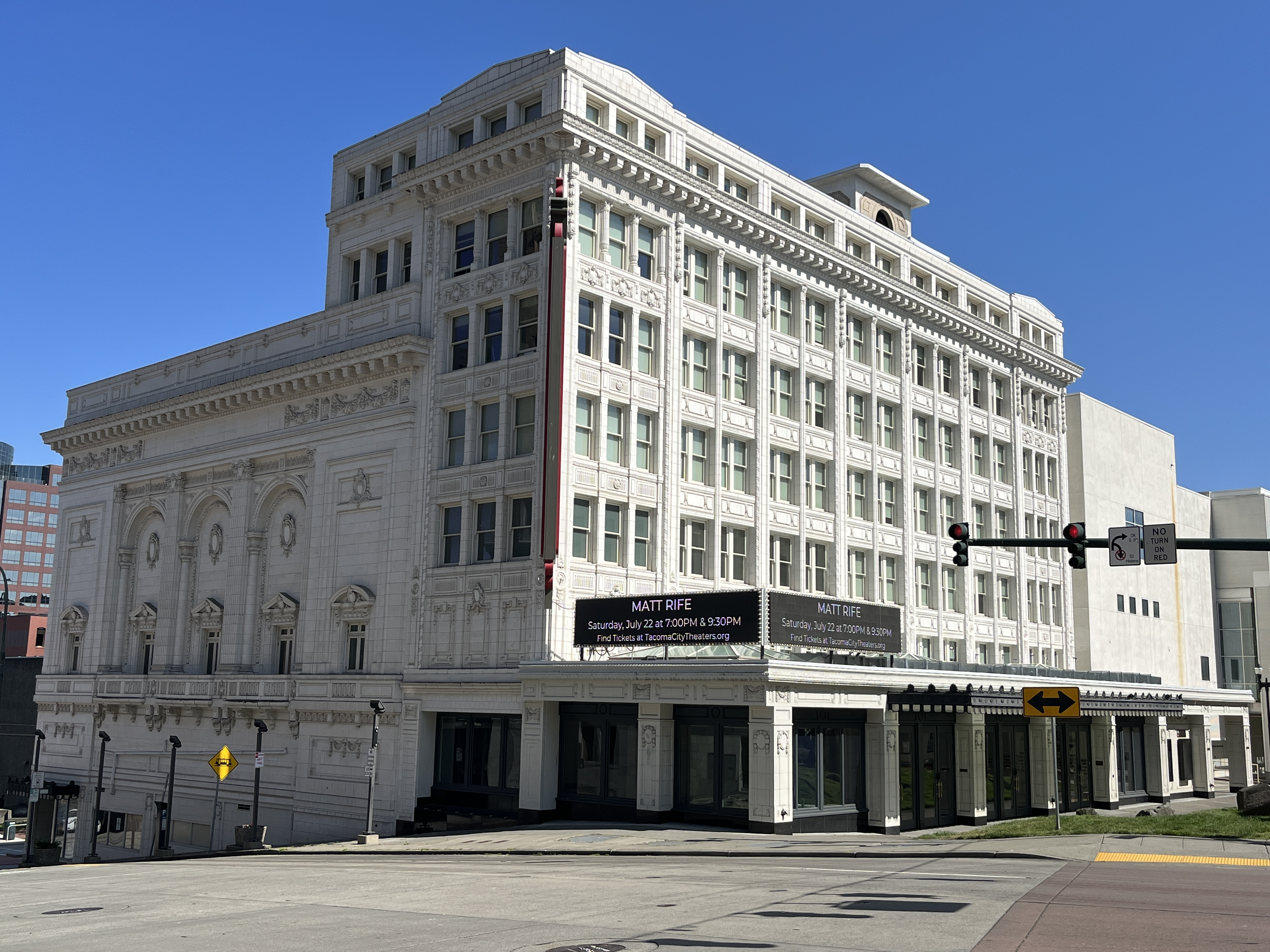
Tacoma's Pantages Theater, a remnant of the vaudeville circuit founded by Alexander Pantages

Tacoma adopted a percent for art ordinance in 1975, allocating one percent of construction costs from major public projects to public art. Though initially managed by the Tacoma Arts Commission, the program was repealed in 1985 following controversy over the use of neon art in the Tacoma Dome. It remained largely unenforced for years, despite the city acquiring 136 public artworks by 1986. The program was reinstated in March 2000.

A hub for arts and heritage, Tacoma's Museum District includes the Museum of Glass, known for its steel cone hot shop and pedestrian Bridge of Glass featuring works by local glass artist Dale Chihuly. Nearby, the America's Car Museum, opened in 2012, showcases over 300 vehicles and includes "Lucky's Garage," a tribute to Harold LeMay's extensive collection. Founded in 1935, the Tacoma Art Museum moved into a new Pacific Avenue building in 2003, forming a core part of the Museum District alongside the Museum of Glass and the Washington State History Museum. The Foss Waterway Seaport offers hands-on exhibits, a working boat shop, moorage, and the region's largest maritime collection.

Fort Nisqually, originally a Hudson's Bay Company fur trading post established in 1833, was reconstructed in the 1930s and now offers a living history experience at its new site in Point Defiance Park. Two original structures, the Factor's House and Granary, were preserved and donated by local citizens. The Buffalo Soldiers Museum highlights the stories of African American soldiers who served in the American West. It is one of only two museums in the U.S. dedicated solely to the Buffalo Soldiers, the other being in Houston. The Washington State History Museum, operated by the Washington State Historical Society, partners with communities to explore state history. Nearby, the Point Defiance Zoo & Aquarium, the only combined zoo and aquarium in the Pacific Northwest, is accredited by the Association of Zoos & Aquariums and sits within Point Defiance Park, offering views of Mount Rainier and Puget Sound.

Tacoma Arts Live operates three theaters, two listed on the National Register of Historic Places. These venues host local institutions including the Tacoma Opera, Symphony Orchestra, City Ballet, Northwest Sinfonietta, and Youth Symphony, among others. Annual events include the Tacoma Film Festival at the Grand Cinema, the Daffodil Parade, and seasonal farmers' markets in the Theatre District and Proctor District. Tacoma also made history as the site of the first modern legal marijuana farmers' market and one of the nation's first needle and syringe programmes. Shakespeare in the Parking Lot performs the works of William Shakespeare in non-traditional venues and provides theatre education

== Sports ==
Team	Sport	League	Founded	Venue
Tacoma Rainiers	Baseball	Pacific Coast League	1960	Cheney Stadium
Tacoma Defiance	Soccer	MLS Next Pro	2014	Cheney Stadium
Tacoma Stars	Indoor Soccer	Major Arena Soccer League	2003	ShoWare Center (Kent)

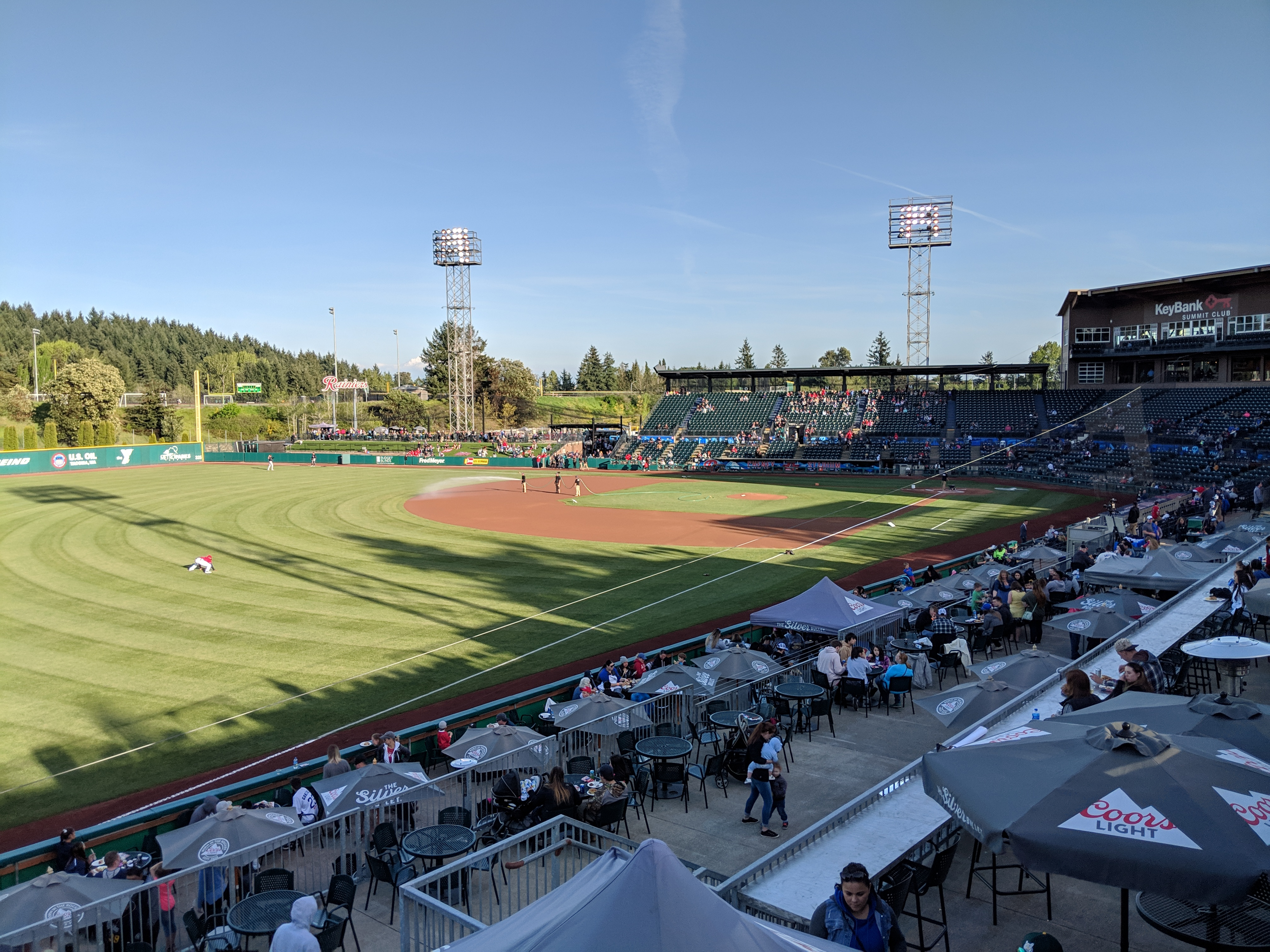
Cheney Stadium is home to the Tacoma Rainiers minor league baseball team.

The Tacoma Dome is the city's main sports venue and opened in 1983. It hosts traveling sports and other events, such as pro-wrestling, figure-skating tours, and tours by the Harlem Globetrotters. For the 1994–95 season, the Tacoma Dome hosted home games of both the National Basketball Association's Seattle SuperSonics (as the Seattle Center Coliseum was under renovation) and the American Professional Soccer League's Seattle Sounders. The Tacoma Dome also hosted the 1988 and 1989 Women's NCAA Final Four.

The city has hosted several now-defunct minor-league hockey franchises. The original Tacoma Rockets played in the Pacific Coast Hockey League from 1946 to 1953. The Rockets were resurrected in the Western Hockey League in 1991 at the Tacoma Dome to record crowds, before moving to Kelowna, British Columbia in 1995. Filling this void, the Tacoma Sabercats formed in the now-defunct West Coast Hockey League in 1997, winning a title in 1999, and closed their doors in 2002 for financial reasons.

Cheney Stadium is home to the Tacoma Rainiers, a AAA minor league baseball team affiliated with the nearby Seattle Mariners since 1995. Minor-league baseball in the city began with the 1903–05 Tacoma Tigers of the then-independent Pacific Coast League (PCL), who were resurrected in the Western International League and played from 1922 until 1951, winning three titles. Following the construction of Cheney Stadium, the Tacoma Giants returned to the PCL in 1960 and were later renamed to the Rainiers. Both the Tacoma Dome and Cheney Stadium hosted events during the 1990 Goodwill Games, an international multi-sport competition.

Tacoma has also had a long history with soccer. In men's outdoor soccer, the city is currently represented in the third-division MLS Next Pro by the Tacoma Defiance, reserve team of MLS's Seattle Sounders FC. The Defiance were founded in 2015 in the USL Championship in nearby Tukwila, Washington, but have been operated jointly with the Rainiers out of Cheney Stadium since 2019. The city's first professional soccer team were the Tacoma Tides, who played one season in 1976 in the American Soccer League. This team was resurrected in 2006 as the Tacoma Tide in the USL PDL, playing primarily in nearby Sumner, Washington. The Tide were folded into the Sounders organization as their U-23 team in 2012, and played until folding in 2019.

In women's outdoor soccer, Reign FC of the National Women's Soccer League played their home games at Cheney Stadium during the 2019, 2020, and 2021 seasons. The Reign considered plans to build a soccer-specific stadium in Tacoma, but ultimately returned to Seattle in 2022.

In 1983, Tacoma's entry into indoor soccer, the Tacoma Stars, began play in the Tacoma Dome as part of the Major Indoor Soccer League. The original Stars folded in 1992, but were reformed in 2003 in the Professional Arena Soccer League. Since 2015, the new Stars have played in the Major Arena Soccer League at the ShoWare Center in nearby Kent, Washington.

Tacoma is home to the all-female flat track roller derby league Dockyard Derby Dames, which fields an away team. Many golf clubs and courses are located in Tacoma including Lake Spanaway Golf Course.

== Parks and recreation ==
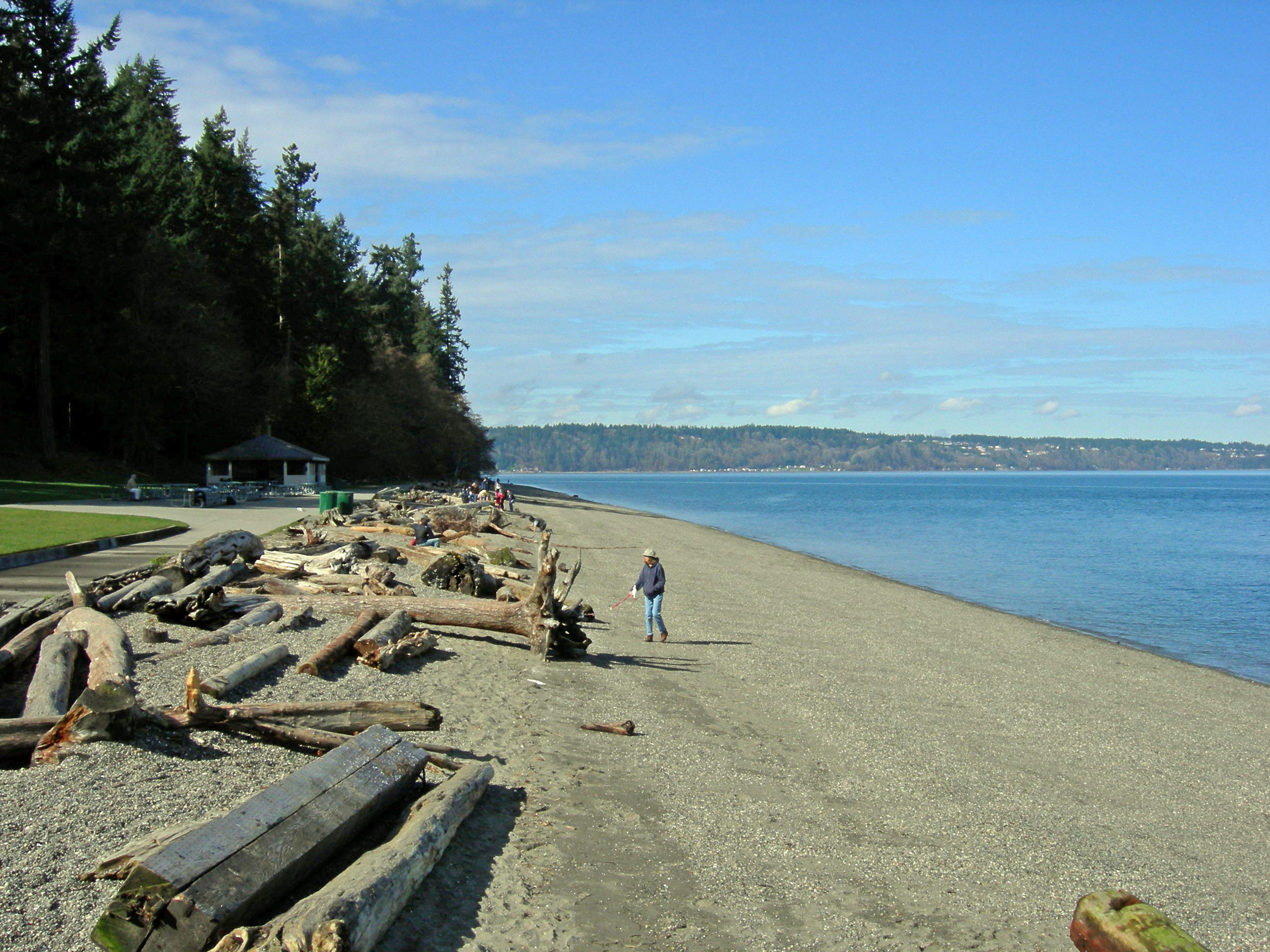
Owen Beach at Point Defiance Park

Parks and recreation services in and around Tacoma are governed by Metro Parks Tacoma, a municipal corporation established as a separate entity from the city government in 1907. Metro Parks maintains over fifty parks and open spaces in Tacoma.

Point Defiance Park, one of the largest urban parks in the country (at 700 acres), is in Tacoma. Scenic Five-Mile Drive allows access to many of the park's attractions, such as Owen Beach, Fort Nisqually, old growth forest trails, and the Point Defiance Zoo & Aquarium (PDZA). There are many historic structures within the park, including the Pagoda, which was originally built as a streetcar waiting room. It was restored in 1988 and now serves as a rental facility for weddings and private parties. The Pagoda was nearly destroyed by fire on August 15, 2011. Repair work began immediately after the fire and continued until January 2013, at which time the Pagoda was reopened for public use.

Ruston Way is a waterfront area along Commencement Bay north of downtown Tacoma that hosts several public parks connected by a multi-use trail and interspersed with restaurants and other businesses. Public parks along Ruston Way include Jack Hyde Park, Old Town Dock, Hamilton Park, Dickman Mill Park, Les Davis Pier, Marine Park, and Cummings Park. The trail is used by walkers, runners, cyclists, and other recreationalists. There are several beaches along Ruston Way with public access, some of which are also popular for scuba diving.

Another large park in Tacoma is Wapato Park, which has a lake and walking trails that circle the lake. Wapato is in Tacoma's south end, at Sheridan and 72nd St.

Titlow Beach, at the end of 6th Avenue, is also a scuba diving area.

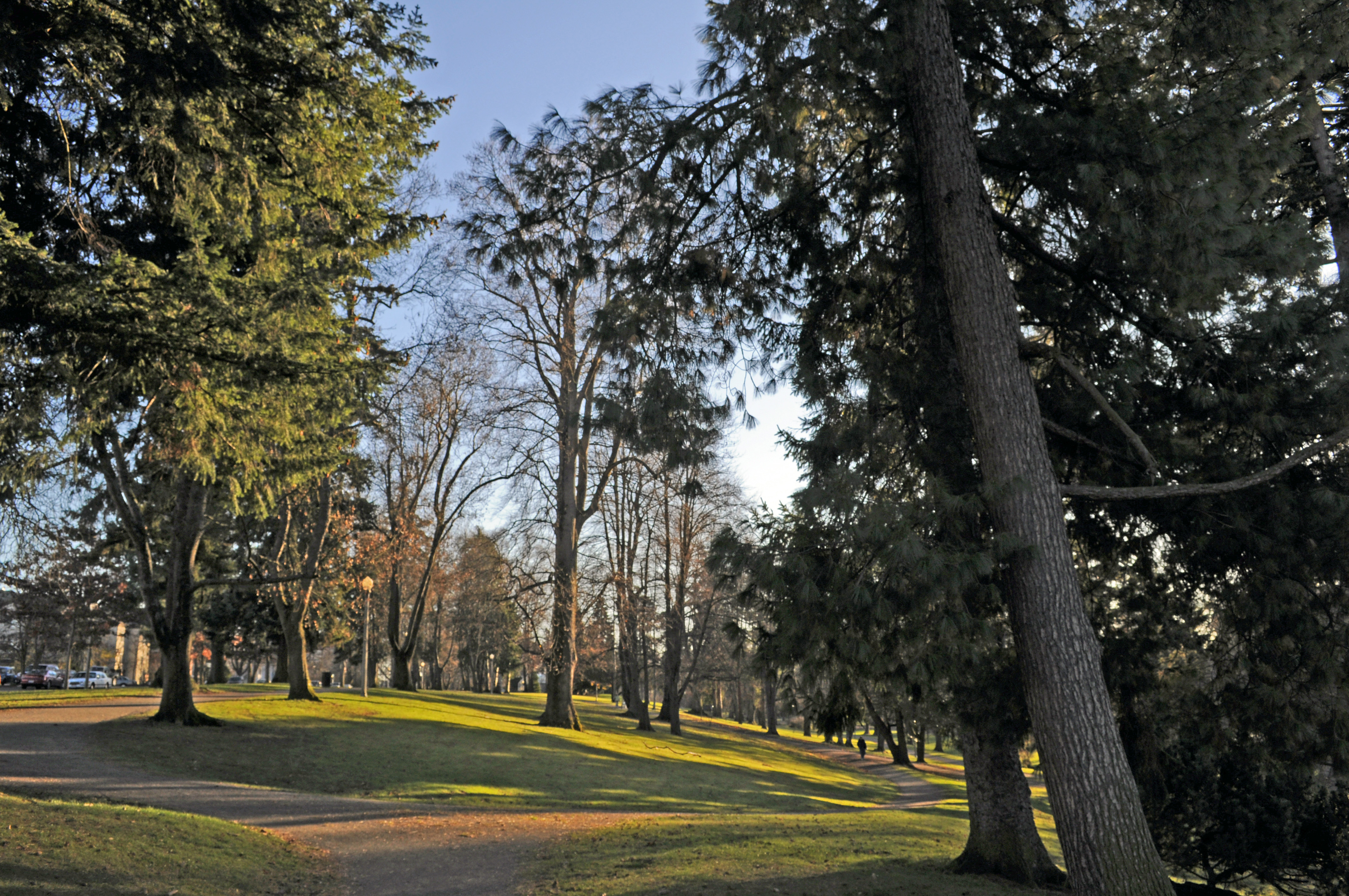
Wright Park

Wright Park, near downtown, is a large, English-style park designed in the late 19th century by Edward Otto Schwagerl and Ebenezer Rhys Roberts. It contains Wright Park Arboretum and the W. W. Seymour Botanical Conservatory. This historic park is also the home of local festivals such as Ethnic Fest, Out in the Park (Tacoma's Pride festival), and the Tacoma Hempfest (Tacoma's annual gathering advocating decriminalization of marijuana).

Jefferson Park in North Tacoma is the location of a new sprayground, an area designed to be a safe and unique play area where water is sprayed from structures or ground sprays and then drained away before it can accumulate.

Frost Park in downtown Tacoma is often utilized for sidewalk chalk contests. Don Pugnetti Park was the site of an Occupy Wall Street encampment.

In response to the Tacoma area's growing dog population and stricter leash laws in many areas, dog parks have begun to be established. Rogers Off-Leash Dog Park is a metro public park established in 1949.

== Government ==
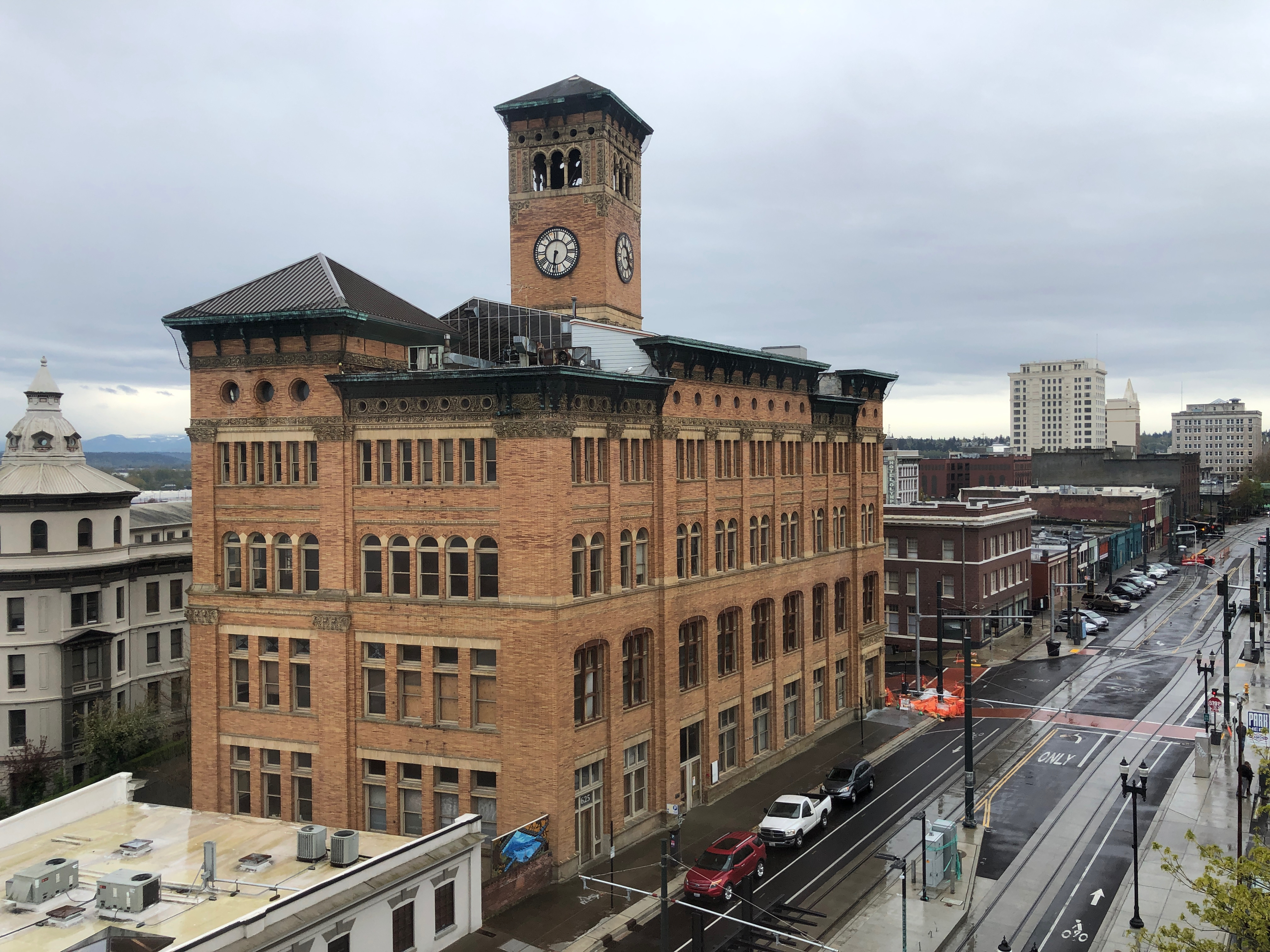
Old City Hall

The government of Tacoma operates under a council–manager government. The Tacoma City Council consists of an elected mayor and eight elected council members: five from individual city council districts and three others from the city at-large. All serve four-year terms and are elected in odd-numbered years.

As of 2023, the city had a staff of approximately 4,035 employees, including temporary employees; and a 2023–2024 biennium budget of approximately $4.3 billion, of which $1.6 billion was for Tacoma Public Utilities.

Anders Ibsen began his term as mayor of Tacoma on January 1, 2026. He previously served as a city councilmember for eight years. The council adopts and amends city laws, approves a two-year budget, establishes city policy, appoints citizens to boards and commissions, and performs other actions. The council also meets in "standing committees", which examine the council's work in more defined areas, such as "Environment & Public Works", "Neighborhoods & Housing", and "Public Safety, Human Services & Education". The council meets as a whole most Tuesdays at 5:00 p.m. in the council chambers at 747 Market St. Meetings are open to the public and provide for public input.

Normal day-to-day operations of the city government are administered by Tacoma's city manager, who is appointed by the city council. Hyun Kim was appointed Interim City Manager on April 29, 2025. He replaced former manager Elizabeth Pauli, who was appointed to the office in 2017 and retired in 2025.

At the federal level, Tacoma is part of two congressional districts. The western and northern portions of the city are part of the 6th District, represented by Emily Randall. The eastern portion is in the 10th District, represented by former Tacoma mayor Marilyn Strickland.

== Education ==
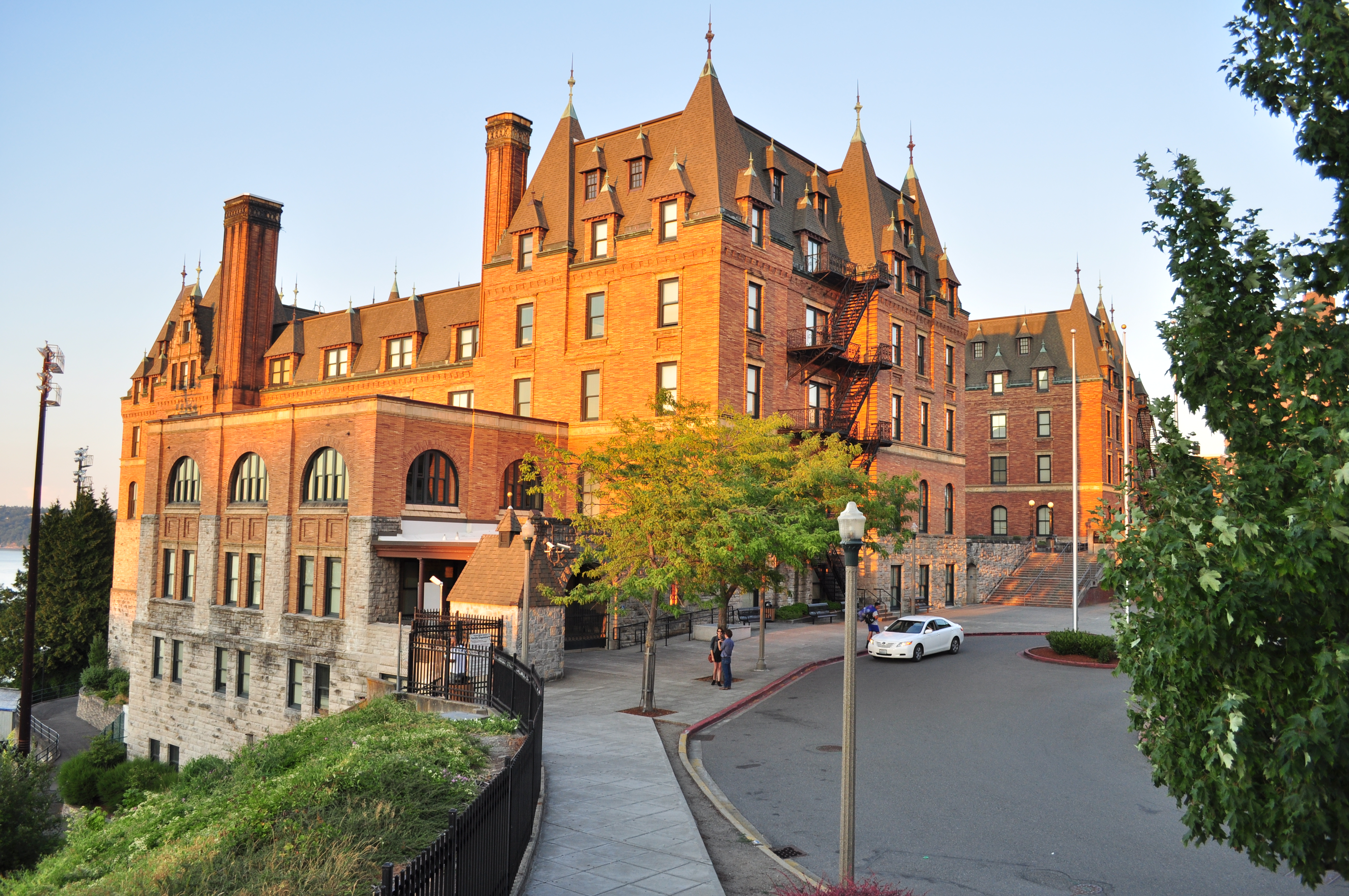
Stadium High School

The majority of Tacoma is within the boundaries of Tacoma Public Schools. The district contains 36 elementary schools, eleven middle schools, and 10 high schools, including three non-traditional high schools (SAMi, SOTA, and iDEA) and two alternative high schools (Oakland and Willie Stewart Academy). Tacoma is also home to three charter public schools: SOAR Academy (elementary), Green Dot Destiny (middle) and Summit Olympus (high) school.

Henry Foss High School operates an International Baccalaureate program. Sheridan Elementary School operated three foreign-language immersion programs (Spanish, French, and Japanese). Mount Tahoma High School opened a new building in South Tacoma in the fall of 2004. Stadium High School and Wilson High School were remodeled/refurbished and reopened in September 2006. Tacoma School of the Arts, opened in 2001 in downtown Tacoma, is a public arts-focused high school and is one of the nation's first schools to implement standards-based instruction. In 2009, SOTA's staff expanded to a second, STEM-based high school located in Point Defiance Park, the Science and Math Institute (SAMI). In 2017, the school district opened a third non-traditional high school in the same vein as SAMI and SOTA, called iDEA (Industrial Design, Engineering, and Art) in south Tacoma. Lincoln High School reopened in the fall of 2007 after a $75 million renovation and expansion.

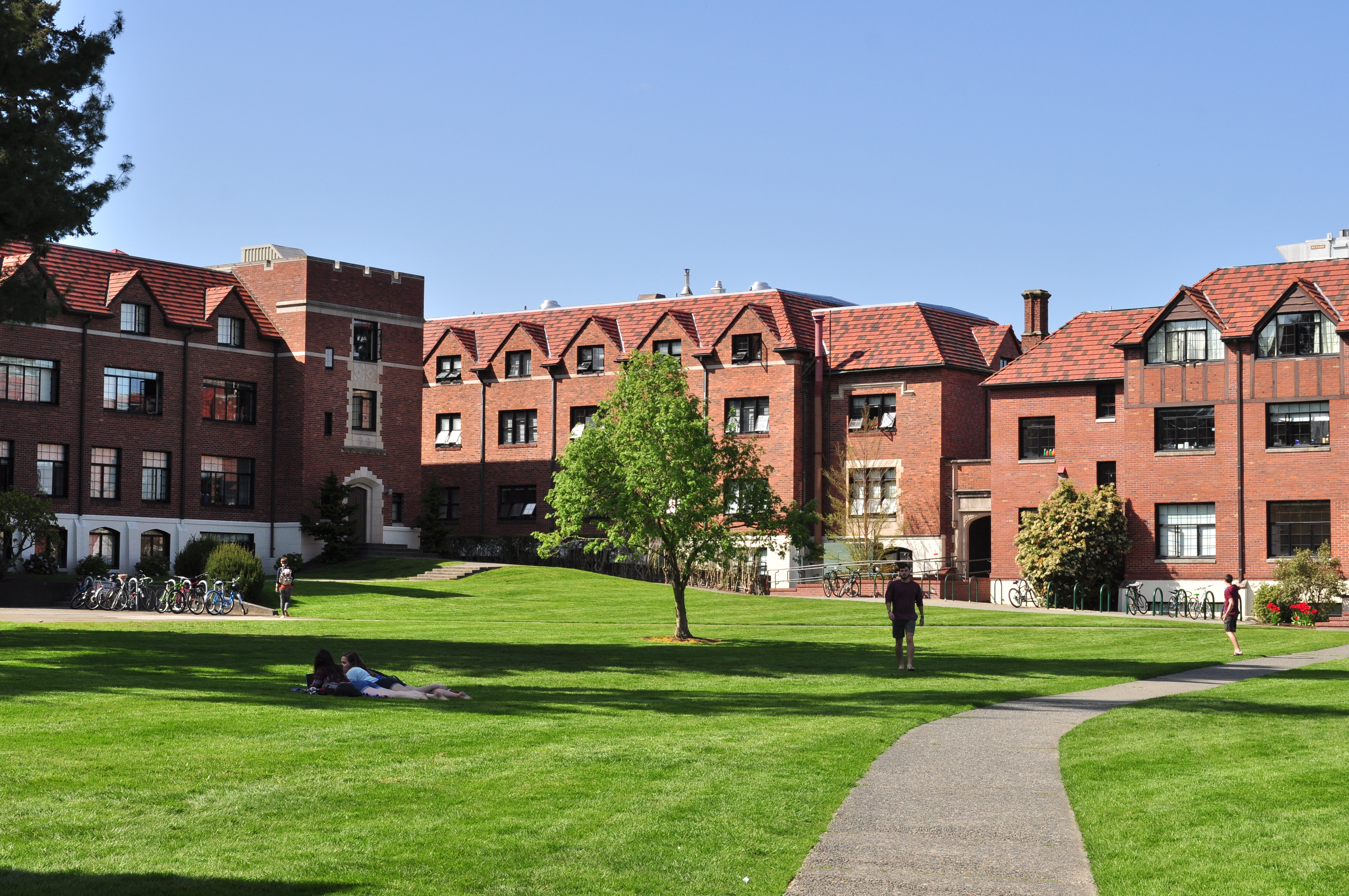
University of Puget Sound campus

Other school districts with territory covering parts of Tacoma are Clover Park School District, Fife Public Schools, Franklin Pierce School District, and University Place School District. The area also has numerous private schools, including Evergreen Lutheran High School, the Annie Wright Schools, Bellarmine Preparatory School, Life Christian Academy, Charles Wright Academy, Covenant High School, and Parkland Lutheran School.

Tacoma's institutions of higher learning include the University of Puget Sound, Tacoma Community College, City University of Seattle-Tacoma, Bates Technical College, Corban University School of Ministry/Tacoma Campus, as well as satellite campuses of The Evergreen State College and the University of Washington. Pacific Lutheran University is in Parkland, just south of the city; nearby Lakewood is the home of Clover Park Technical College and Pierce College.

== Media ==
The city's daily newspaper is The News Tribune, which has a circulation of about 85,000 (100,000 on Sundays), making it the state's third-largest newspaper. The News Tribune was first published on June 17, 1918, as the result of a merger between two competing daily newspapers: The Daily News, started in 1883; (Note: The News was first published as a weekly in 1881 and became a daily in 1883.) and The Tacoma Daily Tribune, started in 1908. The newspaper remained under local ownership until 1986, when it was sold to McClatchy Newspapers. The E. W. Scripps Company published a competing daily, The Tacoma Times, from 1903 to 1949. Other local newspapers include the Tacoma Weekly, the legal paper Tacoma Daily Index, and the alternative newsweekly Weekly Volcano. The University of Washington Tacoma is served by The Ledger, a weekly student newspaper.

Tacoma's media market is shared with Seattle. Four television stations are licensed to the city: KCPQ 13 (Fox), KSTW 11 (Independent), KTBW-TV 20 (TBN), and KWDK 56 (Daystar); with the exception of KSTW, all stations are owned-and-operated by their respective networks. Bates Technical College owns the city's PBS member station, KBTC-TV 28, which serves as the market's secondary PBS station. The city government also runs its own government-access television station, TV Tacoma, broadcasting its meetings and other local affairs.

Nine radio stations are licensed to Tacoma, with two AM stations and seven FM stations; the latter includes NPR affiliates KNKX and KVTI. KNKX was owned and operated by Pacific Lutheran University as KPLU-FM until 2016, when public outcry over a planned sale of the station to the University of Washington resulted in its transition to a community licensee instead; KVTI, owned by Clover Park Technical College, was run by college students until its operation was outsourced to Northwest Public Broadcasting of Washington State University in 2010. Another station involved in campus radio is KUPS, which is run by students at the University of Puget Sound.

== Transportation ==
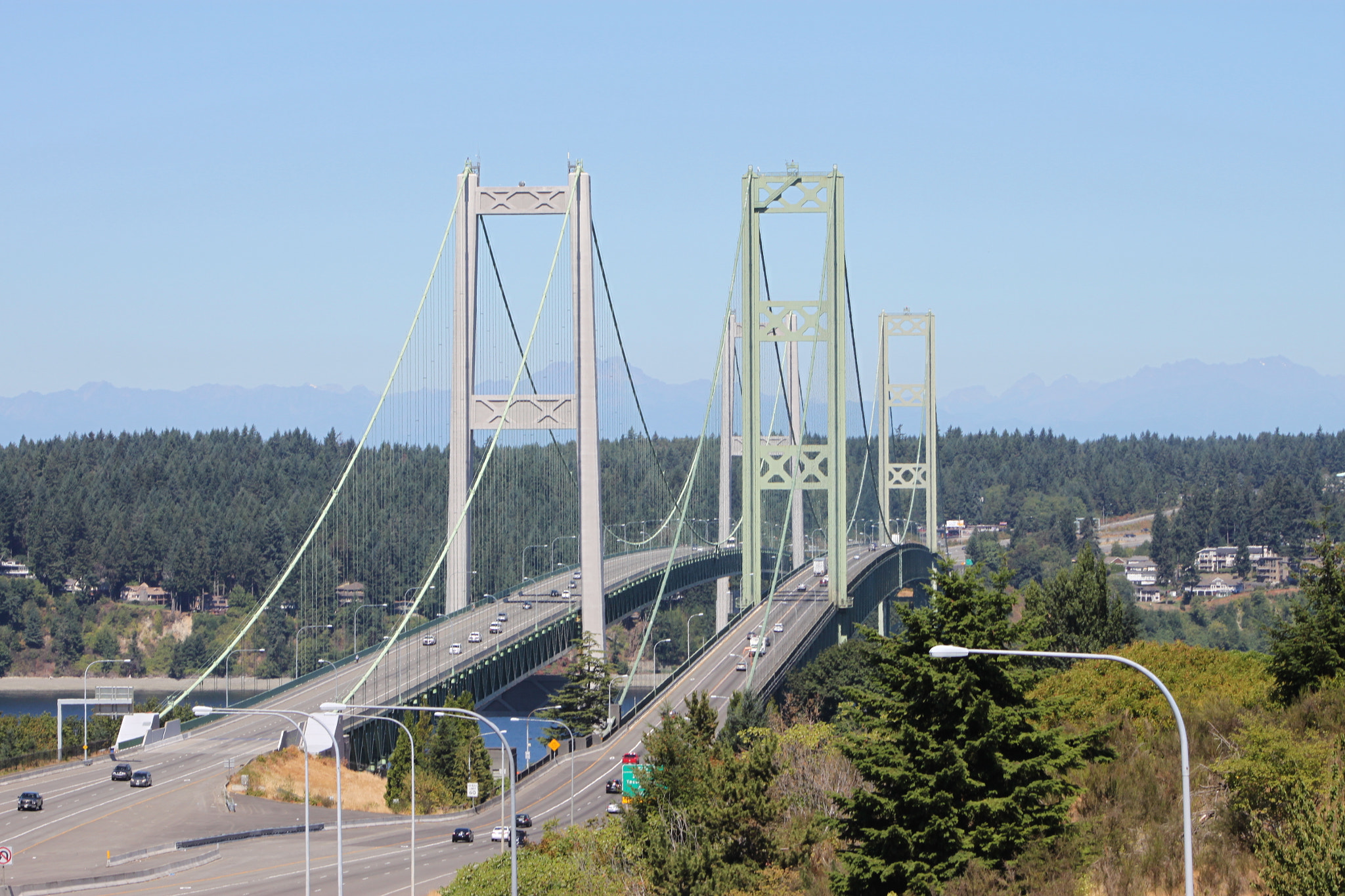
Tacoma Narrows Bridge

Tacoma's system of transportation is based primarily on the automobile. The majority of the city has a system of gridded streets oriented in relation to A Street (one block east of Pacific Avenue) and 6th Avenue or Division Avenue, both beginning in downtown Tacoma. Within the city, and with a few exceptions, east-to-west streets are numbered and north-to-south streets are given a name or a letter. Some east-to-west streets are also given names, such as S. Center St. and N. Westgate Blvd. Streets are generally labeled "North", "South", "East", or "North East" according to their relationship with 6th Avenue or Division Avenue (west of 'Division Ave', '6th Avenue' is the lowest-numbered street, making it the dividing street between "North" and "South"), 'A Street' (which is the dividing line between "East" and "South"), or 1st Street NE (which is the dividing line between "East" and "North East"). This can lead to confusion, as most named streets intersect streets of the same number in both north and south Tacoma. For example, the intersection of South 11th Street and South Union Avenue is just ten blocks south of North 11th Street and North Union Avenue.

To the east of the Thea Foss waterway and 'A Street', streets are similarly divided into "East" and "Northeast", with 1st Street NE being in-line with the Pierce–King county line. "North East" covers a small wedge of Tacoma and unincorporated Pierce County (around Browns Point and Dash Point) lying on the hill across the tideflats from downtown. Tacoma does have some major roads which do not seem to follow any naming rules. These roads include Schuster Pkwy, Pacific Ave, Puyallup Ave, Tacoma Mall Blvd, Marine View Dr (SR 509), and Northshore Pkwy. Tacoma also has some major roads which appear to change names in different areas (most notable are Tyler St/Stevens St, Oakes St/Pine St/Cedar St/Alder St, and S. 72nd St/S. 74th St). These major arterials actually shift over to align with other roads, which causes them to have the name changed.

This numeric system extends to the furthest reaches of unincorporated Pierce County (with roads outside of the city carrying "East", "West", "North West", and "South West", except on the Key Peninsula, which retains the north–south streets but chooses the Pierce–Kitsap county line as the zero point for east–west streets. Until 2018, Key Peninsula's roads also carried a "KP N" or "KP S" ("Key Peninsula North" or "Key Peninsula South") designation at the end of the street name. From 2018, these designations have switched to "NW" and "SW" respectively.

In portions of the city dating back to the Tacoma Streetcar Period (1888–1938), denser mixed-use business districts exist alongside single family homes. Twelve such districts have active, city-recognized business associations and hold "small town"-style parades and other festivals. The Proctor, Old Town, Dome, 6th Avenue, Stadium, Lincoln Business District, and South Tacoma Business Districts are some of the more prominent of these and coordinate their efforts to redevelop urban villages through the Cross District Association of Tacoma. In newer portions of the city to the west and south, residential culs-de-sac, four-lane collector roads and indoor shopping centers are more commonplace.

=== Roads and highways ===
Seven highways end in or pass through Tacoma: I-5, I-705, SR 7, SR 16, SR 163, SR 167, and SR 509.

The dominant intercity transportation link between Tacoma and other parts of Puget Sound is Interstate 5, which links Tacoma with Seattle to the north and Portland, Oregon, to the south. It bisects the city for 6.5 miles (10.5 km) and has several overpasses for pedestrians and cross-traffic. State Route 16 runs along a concrete viaduct through Tacoma's Nalley Valley, connecting Interstate 5 with Central and West Tacoma, the Tacoma Narrows Bridge, and the Kitsap Peninsula.

=== Public transportation ===
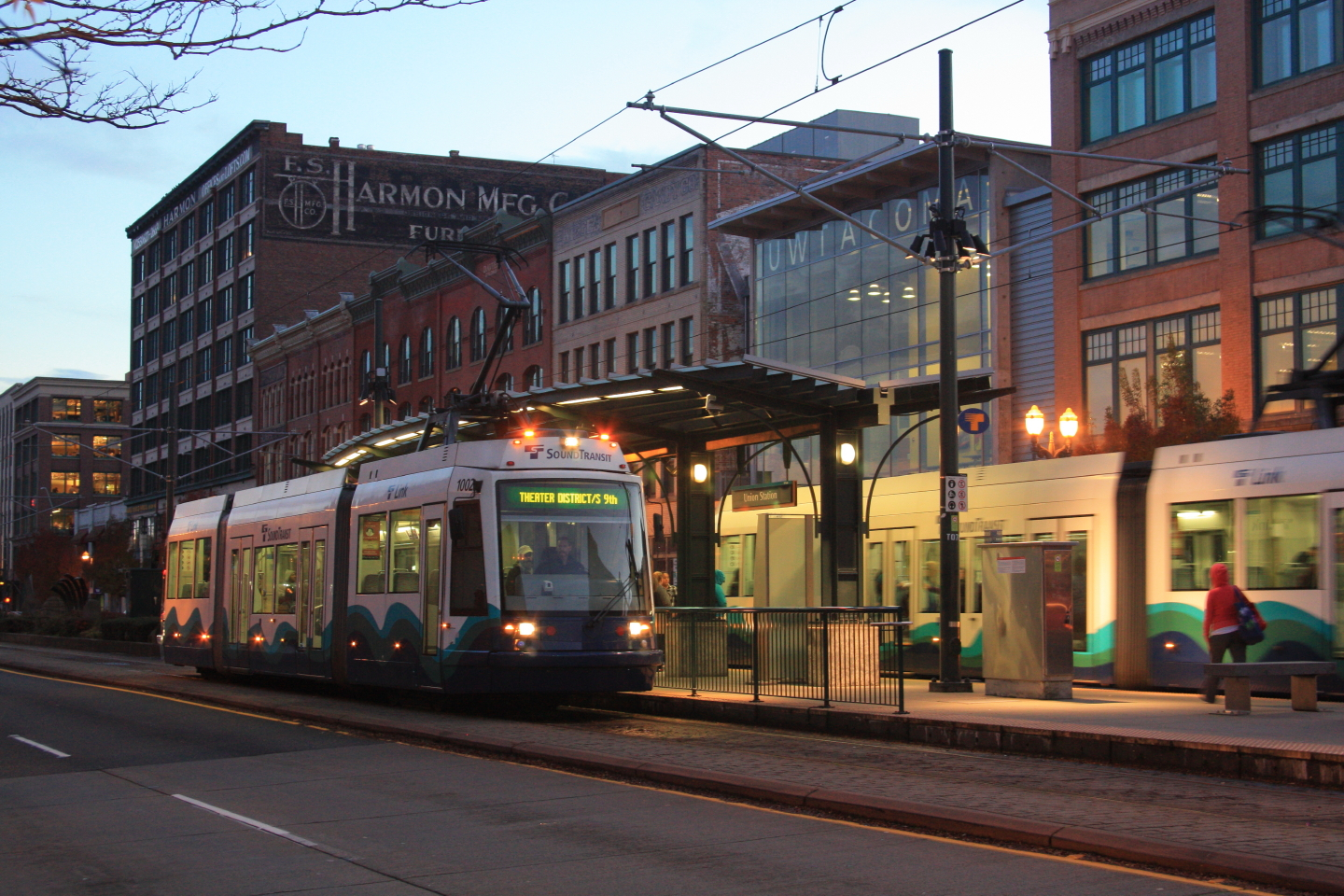
The T Line at Union Station/South 19th Street station

Tacoma has a public transportation network that includes buses, commuter rail, light rail, and ferries. Public bus service is primarily provided by Pierce Transit, which serves Tacoma and most of urban Pierce County. Pierce Transit operates 38 bus routes using a fleet of more than 200 buses powered by compressed natural gas, diesel, and electric batteries. Bus service generally operates at 30–60 minute frequencies on weekdays; prior to service cuts in 2021, several trunk routes had service every 15 to 20 minutes on weekdays. The busiest Pierce Transit bus route, serving the Pacific Avenue corridor, was planned to be upgraded into a bus rapid transit line by 2022, at a cost of $150 million. Significant cost increases during the COVID-19 pandemic caused Pierce Transit to pause the construction of the bus rapid transit line, named the Stream Community Line, and instead launch a limited-stop "enhanced bus" on the corridor in 2024.

The city's main train and bus station is Tacoma Dome Station, a multimodal hub near the Tacoma Dome southeast of downtown. The station is also served by Sounder commuter rail trains to Seattle and intercity Amtrak trains on both the Cascades and Coast Starlight. Sound Transit, the regional transit authority, operates Sounder, the T Line (part of the Link light rail system), and daily Sound Transit Express bus service to and from Seattle. The T Line connects Tacoma Dome Station to Downtown Tacoma, the University of Washington campus, and the Hilltop neighborhood. Sound Transit plans to extend the Tacoma Link light rail further west towards Tacoma Community College along South 19th Street by 2039 or 2041.

The Washington State Ferries system, which has a dock at Point Defiance, provides automobile ferry access to Tahlequah at the southern tip of Vashon Island. Proposals for a passenger-only ferry linking Downtown Tacoma to Seattle have been studied since the 2010s but remain unrealized.

=== Aviation ===
Seattle–Tacoma International Airport lies 22 miles (35 km) north, in the city of SeaTac. The city of Tacoma contributed $100,000 to the airport's construction, in return for it being constructed at Bow Lake. The other proposed location near Lake Sammamish is much further from Tacoma, while Bow Lake is halfway between Seattle and Tacoma.

A seaplane service with tours of the Tacoma area is operated by Kenmore Air from a dock near Old Town. It was started in August 2023 as part of a partnership with the Puyallup Tribe; Kenmore also plans to offer flights from the dock to other destinations in the region.

== Utilities ==
Tacoma's relationship with public utilities extends back to 1893. At that time the city was undergoing a boom in population, causing it to exceed the available amount of fresh water supplied by Charles B. Wright's Tacoma Light & Water Company. In response to both this demand and a growing desire to have local public control over the utility system, the city council put up a public vote to acquire and expand the private utility. The measure passed on July 1, 1893, with 3,195 in favor of acquiring the utility system and 1,956 voting against. Since then, Tacoma Public Utilities (TPU) has grown from a small water and light utility to be the largest department in the city's government, employing about 1,200 people.

Tacoma Power, a division of TPU, provides residents of Tacoma and several bordering municipalities with electrical power generated by eight hydroelectric dams on the Skokomish River and elsewhere. Environmentalists, fishermen, and the Skokomish Tribe have criticized TPU's operation of Cushman Dam on the North Fork of the Skokomish River; the tribe's $6 billion claim was denied by the U.S. Supreme court in January 2006. The capacity of Tacoma's hydroelectric system as of 2004 was 713,000 kilowatts, or about 50% of the demand made up by TPU's customers (the rest is purchased from other utilities). According to TPU, hydroelectricity provides about 87% of Tacoma's power; coal 3%; natural gas 1%; nuclear 9%; and biomass and wind at less than 1%. Tacoma Power also operates the Click! Network, a municipally owned cable television and internet service. The residential cost per kilowatt hour of electricity is just over 6 cents.

Tacoma Water provides customers in its service area with water from the Green River Watershed. As of 2004, Tacoma Water provided water services to 93,903 customers. The average annual cost for residential supply was $257.84.

Tacoma Rail, initially a municipally owned street railway line running to the tideflats, was converted to a common-carrier rail switching utility. Tacoma Rail is self-supporting and employs over 90 people.

In addition to municipal garbage collection, Tacoma offers commingled recycling services for paper, cardboard, plastics, and metals.

== Notable people ==
- Pat Austin, drag racer
- Zach Banner, NFL player
- Calvin S. Barlow, Tacoma pioneer
- Alice D. Engley Beek, painter
- Tucker Bone, soccer player
- Avery Bradley, NBA player
- Richard Brautigan, novelist, poet, and short story writer
- Jeff Brotman, attorney
- Brandon Brown (born 1989), basketball player for Hapoel Jerusalem of the Israeli Basketball Premier League
- Angela Warnick Buchdahl (born 1972), rabbi
- Ted Bundy, serial killer
- Jose Calugas, Medal of Honor recipient
- Dyan Cannon, actress
- Jerry Cantrell, guitarist
- Neko Case, musician
- Dale Chihuly, glass sculptor
- J. W. Cloes, state legislator
- Pat Comfort, politician
- Robert Cray, guitarist and singer
- Bing Crosby, singer and actor
- Elinor Donahue, actress
- Joseph Edward Duncan, serial killer and child molester
- Clinton P. Ferry, Tacoma pioneer and founder, known as the Duke of Tacoma
- Malachi Flynn, basketball player for the Detroit Pistons
- David Friesen, musician
- Abdul Gaddy, basketball player in the Israeli Basketball Premier League
- Kathryn O. Galbraith, writer of children's books
- Cam Gigandet, actor
- Frank Herbert, author
- Abby Williams Hill, artist
- Eleanor Janega, medieval historian, author, broadcaster
- Jo Koy, comedian
- Connie Ladenburg, politician, social worker, volunteer
- John Ladenburg, politician, attorney
- Gary Larson, cartoonist
- John Lippman, television executive and the acting director of Voice of America
- Ron Magden, historian
- Lawyer Milloy, New England Patriots/ Seattle Seahawks, Super Bowl Champion
- KC Montero, actor
- Pamela Reed, actress
- Kelee Ringo, college football player for the Georgia Bulldogs
- Darrell Robinson, track and field athlete
- John Henry Ryan, businessman, newspaperman, and state legislator
- Homer Screws, former professional soccer player, and now coach
- Marilyn Strickland, U.S. representative, former Mayor of Tacoma
- Jessica Spring American letterpress printer, book artist
- Courtney Stodden, media personality
- Swerve Strickland, Professional Wrestler
- Lucy Stedman Lamson, businesswoman, educator
- Jeff Stock, soccer player and businessman
- Michael Swango, serial killer
- Miesha Tate, MMA Champion
- Steve Thel, academic, lawyer
- Isaiah Thomas, NBA player
- Aaron Titlow, lawyer, politician, and real estate developer; the original owner of Titlow Beach
- Desmond Trufant, NFL player
- Blair Underwood, actor
- Jessica Wallenfels, actress, choreographer, and movement/theatre director

== Sister cities ==
Tacoma's sister cities are:

- Kitakyushu, Japan (1959)
- Gunsan, South Korea (1978)
- Ålesund, Norway (1986)
- Vladivostok, Russia (1992)
- Fuzhou, China (1994)
- Davao City, Philippines (1994)
- George, South Africa (1997)
- Cienfuegos, Cuba (2000)
- Taichung, Taiwan (2000)
- El Jadida, Morocco (2007)
- Biot, France (2012)
- Boca del Río, Mexico (2016)
- Brovary, Ukraine (2017)

== See also ==
- Aroma of Tacoma
- Tacoma Public Library
- Urban Grace Church
- USS Tacoma, 4 ships
