= Batchelder House =

Batchelder House may refer to:

- Batchelder House (Pasadena, California), listed on the National Register of Historic Places (NRHP)
- Batchelder House (Reading, Massachusetts), also NRHP-listed
- Alden Batchelder House, Reading, Massachusetts, NRHP-listed
- George Batchelder House, Reading, Massachusetts, NRHP-listed
- Nathaniel Batchelder House, Reading, Massachusetts, NRHP-listed

== See also ==
- Batchelder's Block, Faribault, Minnesota, NRHP-listed in Rice County, Minnesota
