= Stadium Bowl =

Stadium in Tacoma, Washington, US

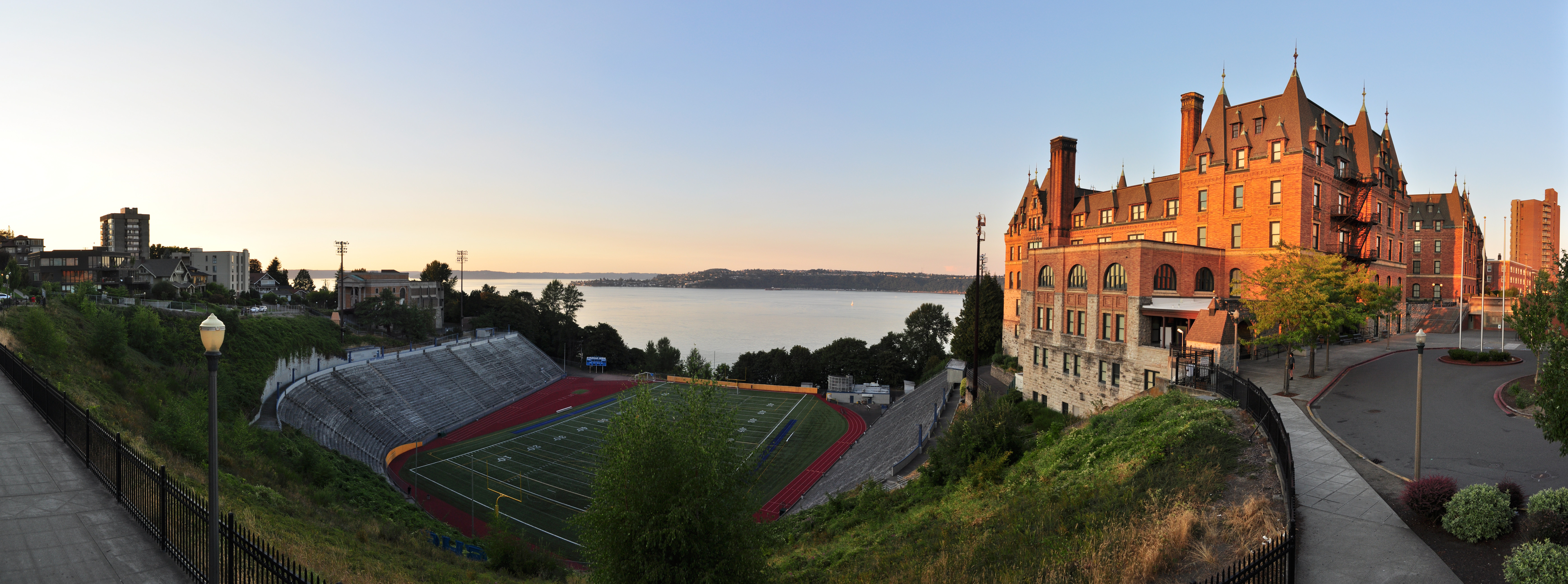
- Panoramic view from the south end in August 2014
- Interactive map of Stadium Bowl
- Former names: Tacoma Stadium
- Location: Tacoma, Washington, U.S.
- Coordinates: 47.267°N 122.449°W
- Owner: Tacoma Public Schools
- Capacity: 15,000
- Surface: FieldTurf

Construction
- Opened: June 10, 1910
- Architect: Frederick Heath

Tenants
- Stadium High School (WIAA); Silas High School (WIAA)

The Stadium Bowl (originally Tacoma Stadium) is a 15,000-seat stadium in the Stadium District of Tacoma, Washington, United States. It is adjacent to Stadium High School and has views of Commencement Bay and Puget Sound from its open north end. The stadium was designed by Frederick Heath and opened in 1910, primarily for use by the then-renamed Stadium High School.

The Stadium Bowl is designed for American football as well as track and field events. It has also hosted baseball and other sports in the past. The stadium originally seated 23,000, but was later reduced in capacity during renovations and restoration projects.

== History ==
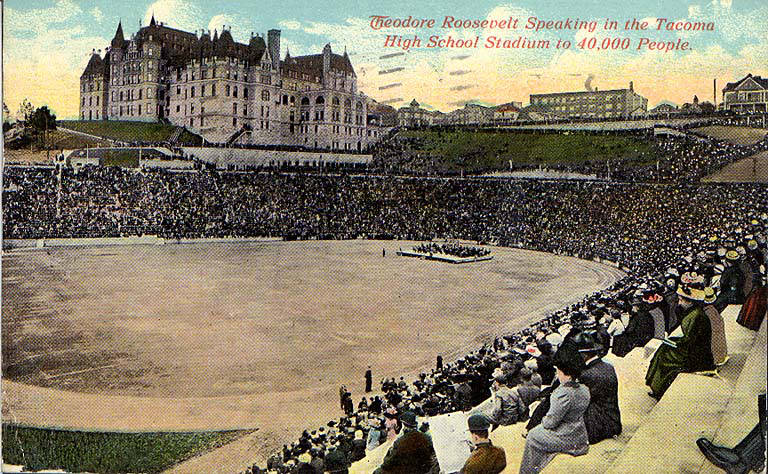
Crowd gathering at Stadium Bowl for a speech made by President Theodore Roosevelt in 1911

The stadium was proposed in 1906 at the site of Old Woman's Gulch and designed by Frederick Heath. It was originally built with a seating capacity of 23,486 and a total capacity of 32,000 that was later reduced to 17,000. The stadium is on an asymmetrical block bounded by North E Street (south); Tacoma High School and North 1st Street (east); North 3rd Street and North Stadium Way (originally Cliff Avenue) (west); and North Schuster Parkway, railroad tracks and Commencement Bay (north).

The stadium was built from 1909 to 1910 using steam shovels and sluicing to move more than 180,000 cubic yards (140,000 m^{3}) down the edges of the gulch to create a flat playing field of 2.5 acres (1.0 ha). Wooden molds were built to cast concrete for 31 rows of stadium seating (able to hold 11,000 spectators) surrounding the playfield. It was dedicated on June 10, 1910, and was originally named Tacoma Stadium. It cost $135,000 to construct (equivalent to $3.28 million in 2024 dollars). One of its first major events held at the new stadium was a military tournament in late July with 32,000 spectators on the final night.

Floodlights were temporarily installed for a 1929 football game, the first to be played at night in the Pacific Northwest. It was home to several minor league sports teams and hosted football and baseball exhibitions for college and professional teams. The stadium was flooded and buried by a mudslide in 1932 and closed until 1935. It later suffered major damaged in the April 1949 and April 1965 earthquakes that shook the Puget Sound region. The Stadium Bowl was condemned due to unsafe conditions, namely the cracked concrete, in 1949 but was later reopened in 1961 following the rebuilding of seated areas at a cost of $60,000.

Demolition of the original seating structure, which had deteriorated further and only had 6,000 usable seats, began in December 1977 ahead of a planned renovation project. The Tacoma School District received a $2 million federal grant for the renovation and initially approved a "no-frills" design with 15,000 seats and no floodlights; a state grant allowed for the floodlights to be re-added to the design plan, which also included locker rooms under the stands. The 15,000-seat stadium reopened on August 23, 1980, with a two-day arts fair, soapbox derby, and re-dedication ceremony.

In October 1981, a burst storm drain washed away the scoreboard and the north end zone of the football field. The stadium reopened on October 23, 1985, following the installation of a new artificial turf surface and track that cost $725,000. The Tacoma Express, a semi-professional American football team playing in the Minor League Football System, moved to the Stadium Bowl for the 1990 season after being unable to afford to stay at the Tacoma Dome. The team was folded by the league in September 1990 after playing without an owner for several weeks.

On October 10, 2015, Stadium bowl experienced a mass flooding due to improper drain management. Videos of the bowl flooding quickly went viral. The videos of the bowl flooding were so captivating that they were even featured on CNN. Despite having multiple drains in the streets above the stadium, the drains became too overwhelmed with water, causing the flooding. The water eroded soil under the stadium's main stairwell, soaked the field-turf with water, mud, and debris, flooded the locker rooms used by home and away teams, and also caused a small trench to form on the Northern side of the stadium. The flooding would cause all subsequent sporting events at the stadium to be postponed, canceled, or relocated to nearby fields or schools. Officials decided to keep the stadium closed until early 2016, and football games would not return until the following September.

== Notable events ==
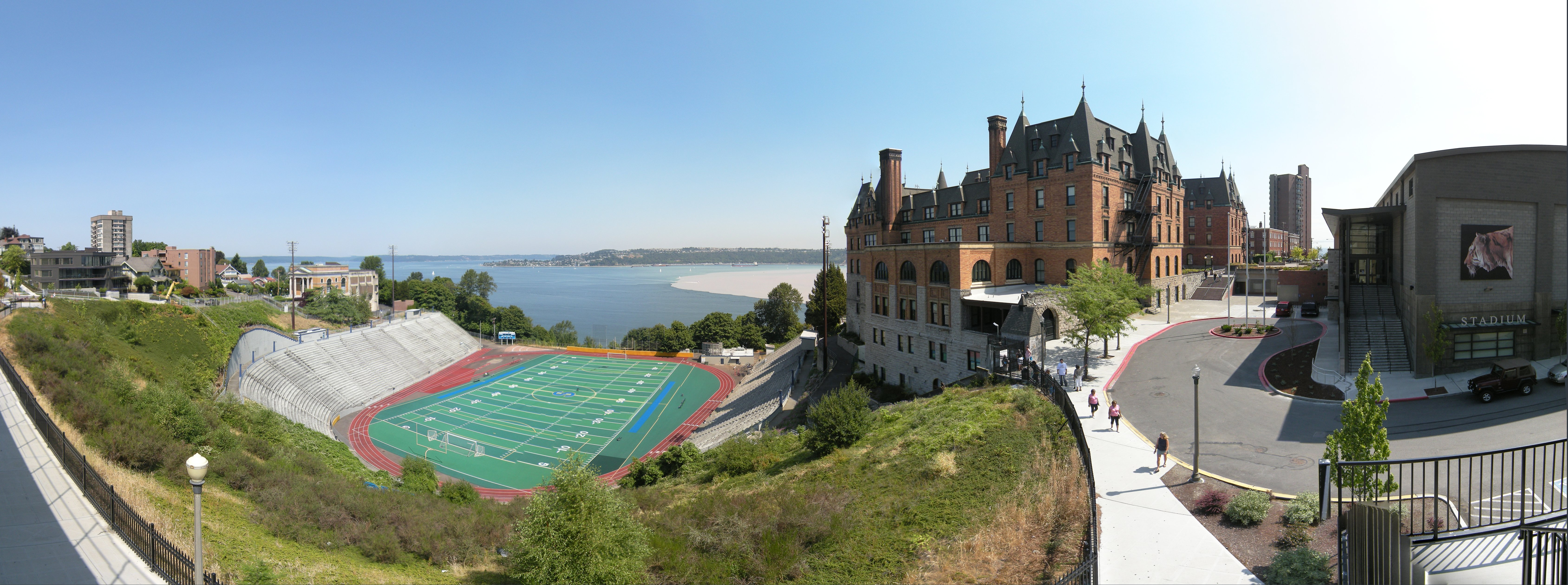
A panorama of the stadium and adjacent high school, with Commencement Bay in the background (2008)

Stadium Bowl has hosted multiple sporting events, concerts, and ceremonies including:

- Speeches held by United States Presidents Theodore Roosevelt, Woodrow Wilson, and Warren Harding and United States Secretary of State William Jennings Bryan
- Ceremonies and battle reenactments for military figures such as John Pershing and Marshal Foch
- Baseball exhibitions for players such as Babe Ruth and Billy Sunday
- The Washington State Cougars of Pullman played a football game against team from Camp Lewis at the stadium in 1917
  - The Cougars also played Texas A&M in December 1941
  - and hosted Penn State on Thanksgiving weekend in 1948
- Gasoline powered model airplane meetup in 1947

== Appearances in media ==
Stadium High School was used as a filming location in the 1999 cult classic film, 10 Things I Hate About You. Renamed "Padua High School" in the movie, many scenes were filmed at the school, including the scene that involves Heath Ledger's character serenading Julia Stiles' character while she is at soccer practice in the Stadium Bowl. While singing Frankie Valli's "Can't Take My Eyes Off You", Ledger ran up and down the stairs of the Bowl.

Stadium Bowl was chosen in 2008 as one of the best high school football stadiums in the U.S. by ESPN.

Stadium Bowl was listed on MaxPreps as one of "10 high school football stadiums to see before you die".

Sports Illustrated also listed Stadium as one of the 13 must see high school football stadiums in the United States.
