= Stadium District, Tacoma, Washington =

- Stadium-Seminary Historic District
- U.S. National Register of Historic Places
- U.S. Historic district
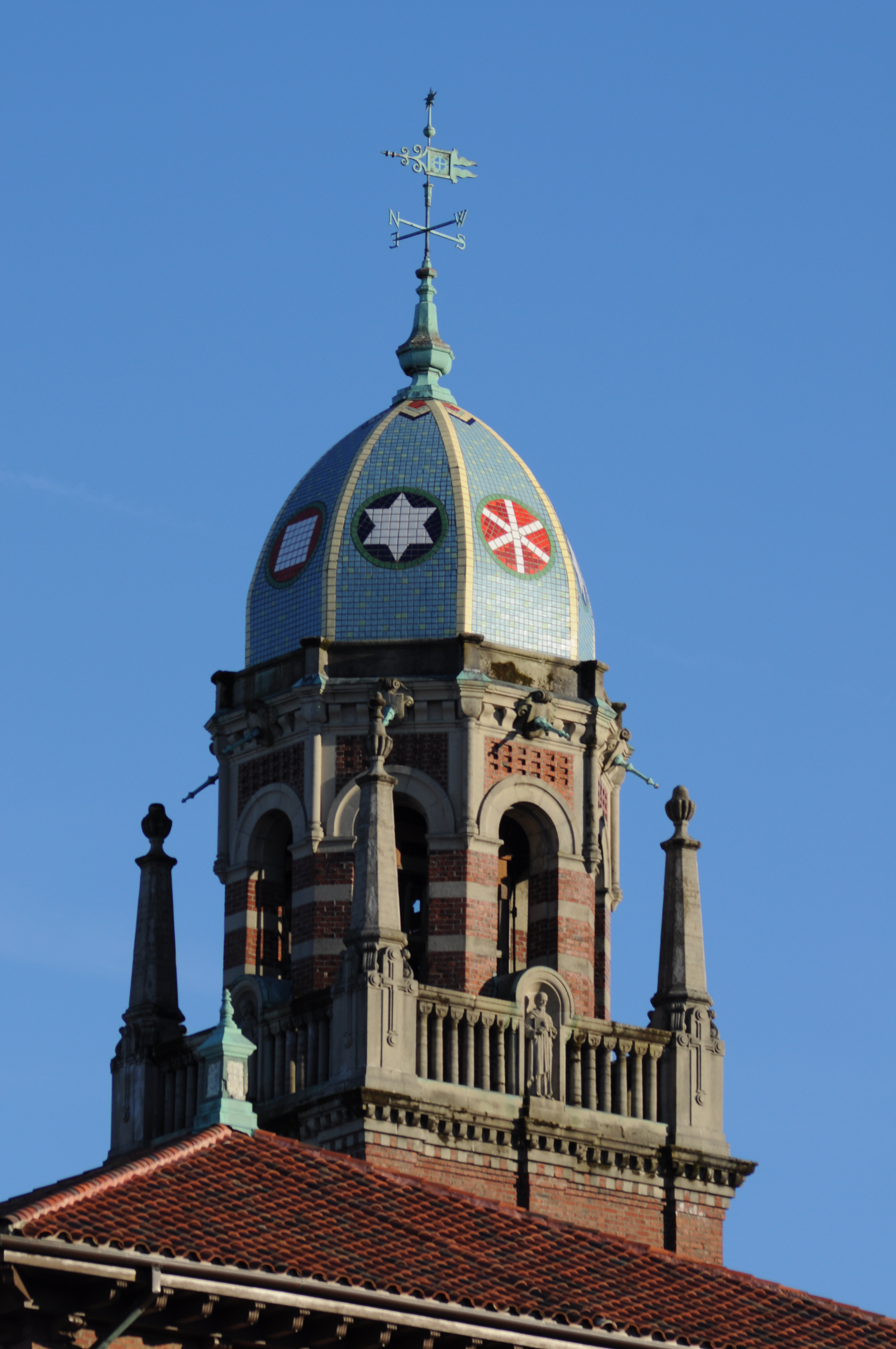
- The cupola of the First Presbyterian Church, just south of the historic district is one of many notable buildings around the Stadium District

- Location within Washington (state)
- Location: Roughly bounded by 1st, I, and 10th Streets and shoreline
- Coordinates: 47°15′53.3″N 122°26′56.8″W
- Area: approximately 200 acres (81 ha)
- Built: 1888-1930
- Architect: multiple
- Architectural style: Queen Anne, Colonial Revival, Châteauesque, Neoclassical Revival, Mission style
- NRHP reference No.: 77001353
- Added to NRHP: August 23, 1985

The Stadium District is a neighborhood of the north end of Tacoma, Washington, USA. It is named after Stadium High School, a historic landmark.

The district is located between the North Slope residential neighborhood and the Stadium Business District and the Hilltop neighborhood further to the south. The area shares more in common with Tacoma's downtown owing to its urban nature and large population of apartment-dwelling working class residents. The area consists primarily of single family homes, apartment & condominium buildings, some with views of Commencement Bay.

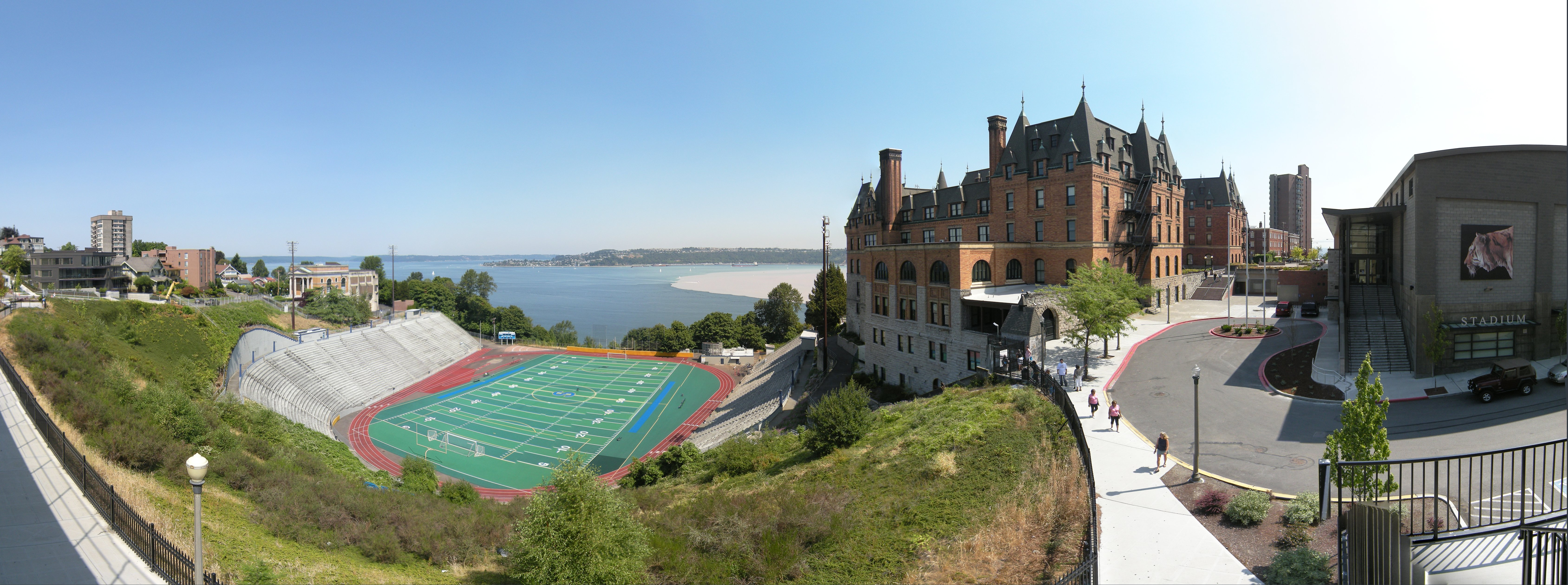
A panorama of the eponymous cliffside stadium of Stadium High School

== Old Woman's Gulch ==
Old Woman's Gulch is a ravine, or system of ravines, located in the north end of Tacoma, Washington.

Originally named after the old longshoremen's widows who were displaced during the construction of the sports field that gave Stadium High School its namesake, the original Old Woman's Gulch is located in the Stadium District. At a later date, the name "Old Woman's Gulch" was also used to describe the gulch system that runs through the entirety of the north end, including the more residential areas to the west of the Stadium District, near the Proctor District. Today, few people are aware that the ravine is known as the Old Woman's Gulch, instead referring to it simply as "the gulch" or "the ravine."
