= Charles N. Daniels (architect) =

American architect

- Born: November 26, 1828; Leon, New York, U.S.
- Died: October 15, 1892 (aged 63); Tacoma, Washington, U.S.
- Occupation: Architect
- Practice: Rice & Daniels; C. N. Daniels; Daniels & Proctor; Daniels & Cook

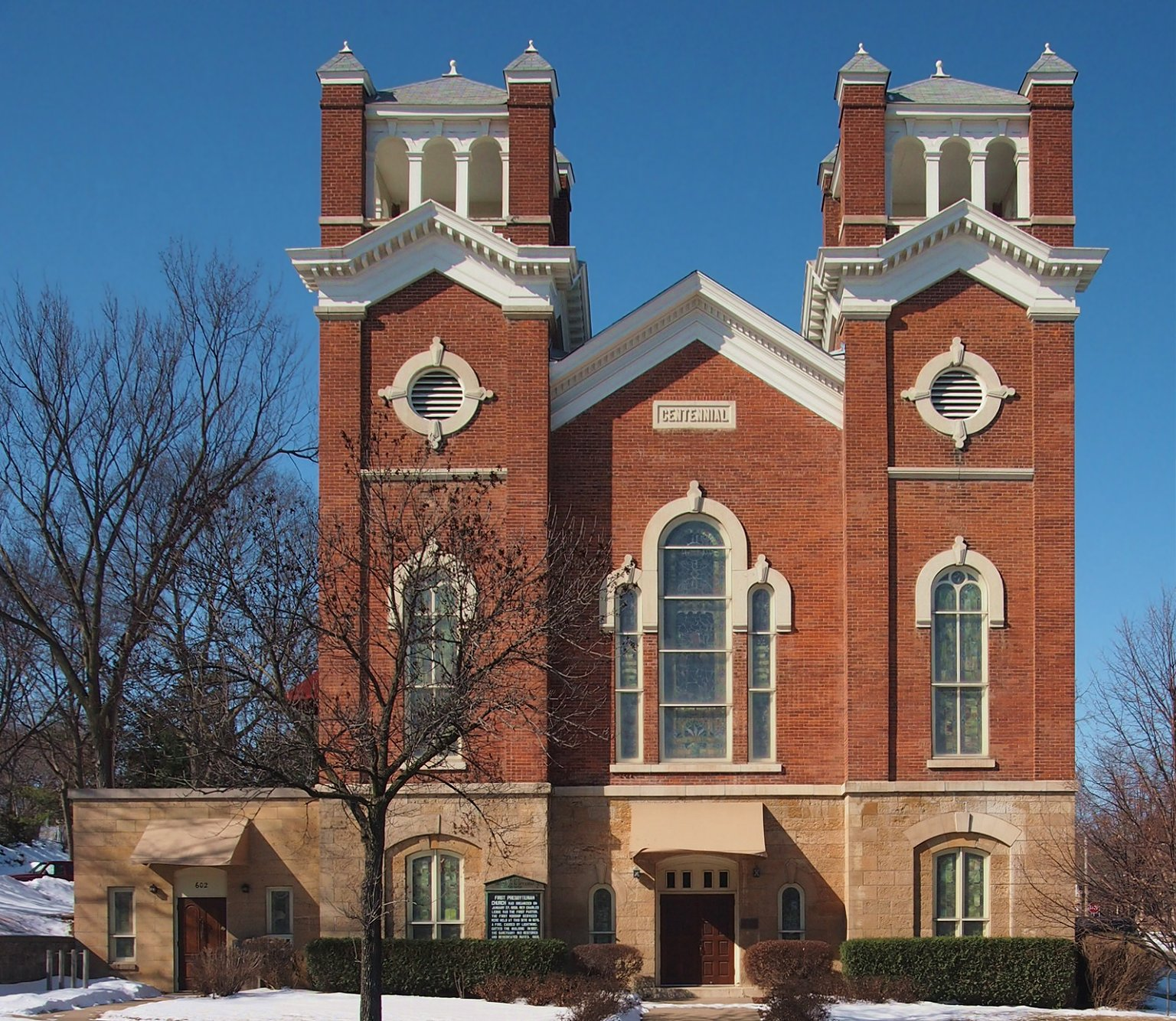
First Presbyterian Church, Hastings, Minnesota, 1875.

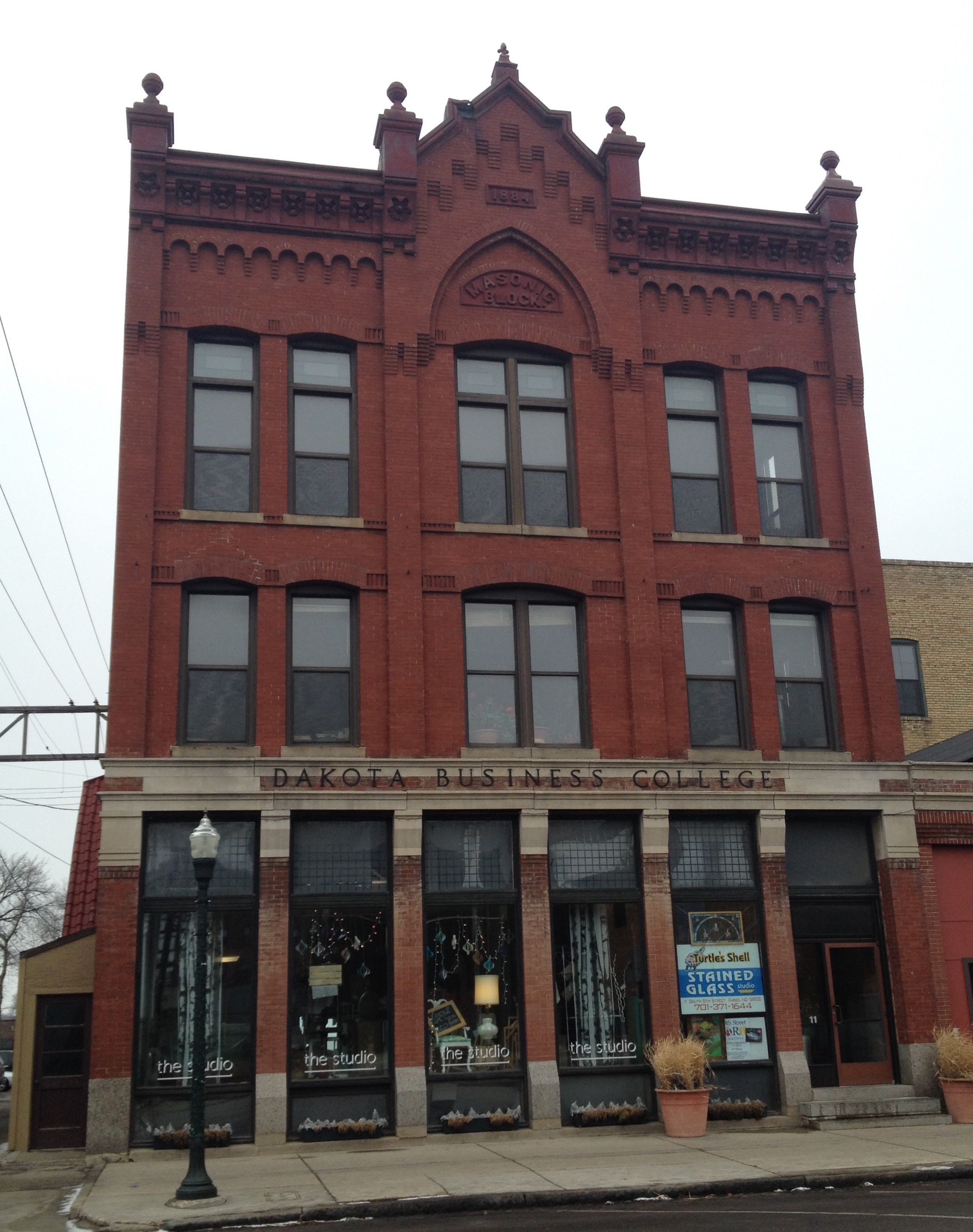
Masonic Block, Fargo, North Dakota, 1884.

Charles N. Daniels (1828-1892) was an American architect active in Minnesota, North Dakota, and Washington.

== Life and career ==
Daniels was born in 1828 in Leon, New York. In 1852 he went to Minnesota, settling in St. Paul. He went to St. Anthony in 1855 and Faribault in 1862, where he established himself as a contractor in the firm of Rice & Daniels. By 1868, he was also practicing as an architect. He would have likely dropped the contracting work soon afterward. He moved to Fargo, North Dakota in 1879, becoming one of the Dakota Territory's first architects. In 1882 he partnered with John G. Proctor, formerly of Ontario. In 1884 Daniels & Proctor moved their offices to Tacoma, Washington, and dissolved their partnership in 1887. In 1888 he established the new firm of Daniels & Cook with Samuel A. Cook. He later became an insurance agent.

== Death ==
Daniels died in Tacoma in 1892.

== Legacy ==
Several of his works have been listed on the U.S. National Register of Historic Places.

== Works as contractor ==
- Cathedral of Our Merciful Saviour, 515 2nd Ave NW, Faribult, Minnesota (1862–68)
- Congregational Church of Faribault, 227 3rd St NW, Faribault, Minnesota (1867)
- Batchelder's Block, 120 Central Ave. N., Faribault, Minnesota (1868)

== Works as architect ==
=== Charles N. Daniels, 1868-1882 ===
- Batchelder's Block, 120 Central Ave. N., Faribault, Minnesota (1868)
- Rice County Courthouse, 218 3rd St. NW, Faribault, Minnesota (1873–74) - Burned 1932.
- First Presbyterian Church, 602 Vermillion St., Hastings, Minnesota (1875–81)
- C. C. Clement House, 608 N. Burlington Ave., Fergus Falls, Minnesota (1882) - Attributed.

=== Daniels & Proctor, 1882-1887 ===
- Luger Block, 716 Main Ave., Fargo, North Dakota (1882)
- Cass County Courthouse, 211 9th St. S., Fargo, North Dakota (1883) - Burned 1903.
- First National Bank Building, 2 6th Ave. N., Casselton, North Dakota (1883) - Remodeled 1912 after fire.
- Masonic Block, 11 8th St. S., Fargo, North Dakota (1884)
- Drum/Paulson Duplex, 202-204 Tacoma Ave. N., Tacoma, Washington (1886)
- Chambers Block, 110 N. Capitol Way, Olympia, Washington (1887)

=== Charles N. Daniels, 1887-1888 ===
- Lincoln School, 1610 MLK Jr. Way, Tacoma, Washington (1887) - Demolished.
- Hotel Rochester, 109 Tacoma Ave. S., Tacoma, Washington (1888) - Demolished 1966.
- St. John's Episcopal Church, 904 Washington St. SE, Olympia, Washington (1888)

=== Daniels & Cook, 1888-c.1890 ===
- Fannie C. Paddock Hospital, 512 S. J St., Tacoma, Washington (1888) - Demolished.
- Christ Episcopal Church, 316 N. K St., Tacoma, Washington (1889) - Demolished.
- Rufus J. Davis House, 711 N. J St., Tacoma, Washington (1889)
- Franklin School, 3210 S. 12th St., Tacoma, Washington (1889) - Demolished.
- William Fraser House, 424 N. D St., Tacoma, Washington (1889) - Demolished.
- Conrad L. Hoska House, 410 N. D St., Tacoma, Washington (1890)
- Immanuel Presbyterian Church, 901 N. J St., Tacoma, Washington (1890–91) - Demolished.
- Park Hotel, Pioneer Ave. & Meridian St., Puyallup, Washington (1890) - Never completed. Demolished.
- Welles Wheeler House, 802 N. J St., Tacoma, Washington (1890)
