= North Takoma =

North Takoma may refer to:

- North Tacoma, Tacoma, Washington, a neighborhood in Tacoma, Washington
- North Takoma station, a train station on the Baltimore and Ohio Railroad Metropolitan Subdivision
- The unofficial name for the fictional U.S. state where Springfield (The Simpsons) is located
