= Mason Middle School =

Mason Middle School can refer to several schools:

- Mason Middle School in Mason, Ohio
- Mason Middle School in Proctor District, Tacoma, Washington
