= Batchelder House (Reading, Massachusetts) =

Historic house in Massachusetts, United States

- U.S. National Register of Historic Places
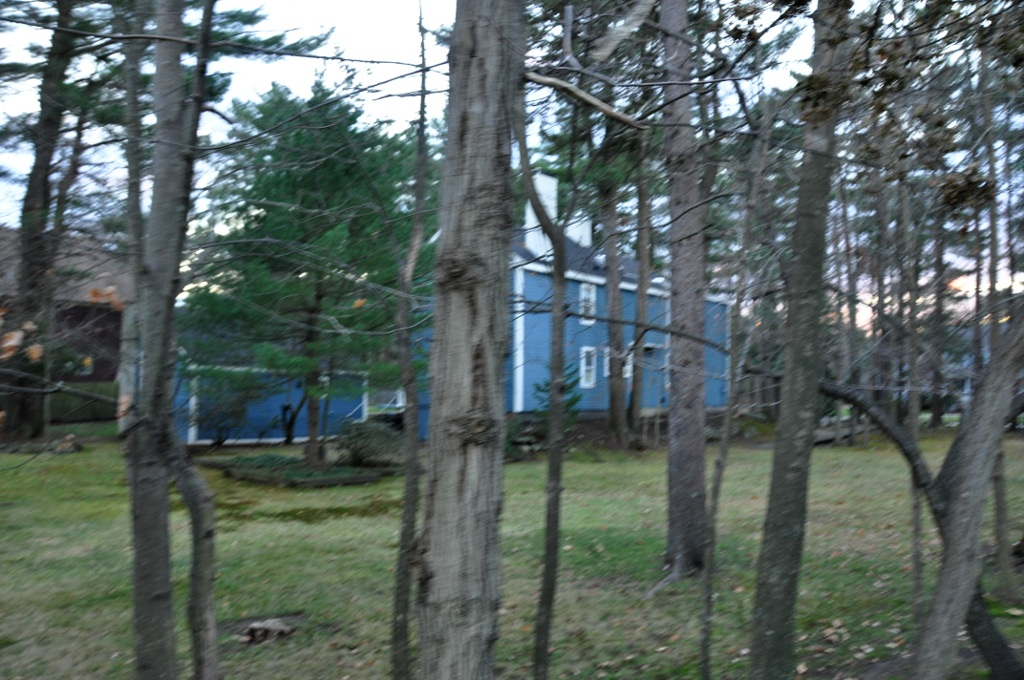

- Location within Massachusetts Location within the United States
- Location: 607 Pearl St., Reading, Massachusetts
- Coordinates: 42°33′13″N 71°6′6″W
- Built: 1783
- Architectural style: Federal
- MPS: Reading MRA
- NRHP reference No.: 84002501
- Added to NRHP: July 19, 1984

The Batchelder House is a historic house at 607 Pearl Street in Reading, Massachusetts. Built about 1783, it is a good local example of Federal period architecture. It is also significant for its association with the locally prominent Batchelder family, and as an early shoemaking site. The house was listed on the National Register of Historic Places in 1984.

== Description and history ==
The Batchelder House stands in a residential area of northern Reading, at the southeast corner of Pearl and Franklin Streets. It is a 2 1/2-story wood-frame structure, with a gabled roof and clapboarded exterior. It has a large central chimney and a symmetrical five-bay front facade, which is oriented facing south. At the center of the facade is the main entrance, which has a Greek Revival surround of sidelight windows and pilasters supporting an entablature and peaked cornice. A smaller two-story ell projects to the right side at a recess.

The property on which the house stands was long under ownership of the locally prominent Batchelder family, whose homestead was known to be standing here about 1703. The property passed to Nathaniel Batchelder about 1783, and he is said to have built the present house on the location of the old homestead. Batchelder was a farmer and shoemaker, and his descendants continued to own the property and be involved in those trades through the 19th century. The house is architecturally most notable for its transitional Federal-Greek Revival door surround.

== See also ==
- Alden Batchelder House
- George Batchelder House
- Nathaniel Batchelder House

== See also ==
- National Register of Historic Places listings in Reading, Massachusetts
- National Register of Historic Places listings in Middlesex County, Massachusetts
