= North Slope =

North Slope can refer to:

- Alaska North Slope, a region encompassing the northernmost part of the U.S. state of Alaska
- North Slope Borough, Alaska, a borough in Alaska whose boundaries roughly coincide with that of the region
- North Slope, Tacoma, Washington, a neighborhood
- North Slope, an Inupiaq language dialect
- Alaska gas pipeline, also known as the North Slope Gas Pipeline
- Dalton Highway, also known as the North Slope Haul Road
- Prudhoe Bay Oil Field, colloquially known as "the North Slope" to many who work and visit there
