= Pantages Theater (Tacoma, Washington) =

- Pantages Theatre
- U.S. National Register of Historic Places
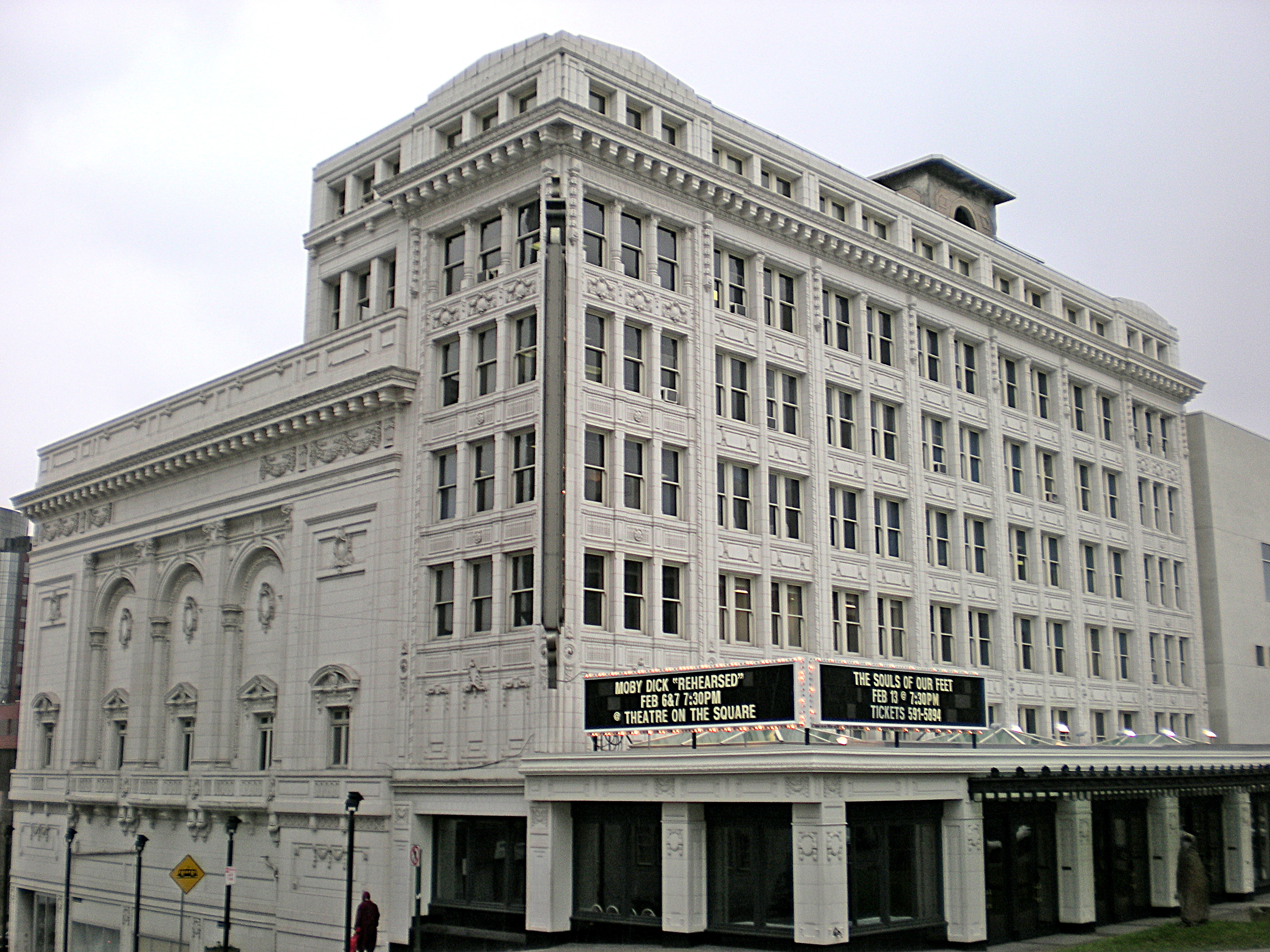
- The Pantages Theater in Tacoma, Washington

- Location within Washington (state) Location within the United States
- Interactive map showing the location of Pantages Theater
- Location: 901 and 909 Broadway, Tacoma, Washington
- Coordinates: 47°15′19″N 122°26′22″W
- Area: less than one acre
- Built: 1916
- Architect: B. Marcus Priteca
- Architectural style: Late 19th And 20th Century Revivals, Second Renaissance Revival
- NRHP reference No.: 76001902
- Added to NRHP: November 7, 1976

The Pantages Theatre or Jones Building in Tacoma, Washington was designed by the architect B. Marcus Priteca. The theater was commissioned in 1916 by the theater manager Alexander Pantages and opened in January 1918. It was designed to be an office building and a vaudeville theatre. The theater's Second Renaissance Revival style is juxtaposed with the Commercial style. The exterior above the ground floor is largely unaltered. The building still houses entertainment and commercial activities (Tacoma City Theaters) A brief overview of the owner and renovation history, in 1916–1918, B. Marcus Priteca with Edwin W. Houghton; 1955 remodel, Carlson, Eley, and Grevstad; 1982–1983 renovation, Richard F. McCann; 2006 entrance/lobby renovation, Korth Sunseri Hagey and Grulich Architecture and Planning; 2014 stage expansion and structural renovations, BCRA. 901 Broadway.

== Exterior ==
It stands at the end of a block formed by Commerce Street, Ninth Street, and Broadway Plaza. The setting is characterized of downtown commercial activities and remains faithful to late 19th and early 20th century streetscapes. The building measures 100 feet (30 m) on the north (Ninth Street) by 115 feet (35 m) along the west (Broadway). The building uses a steel frame with reinforced concrete walls. The Ninth Street and Broadway facades are white, glazed terra cotta in a matte finish. The Commerce Street façade is yellowish-toned brick. The Ninth Street facade of the theater is divided horizontally into three major sections, and vertically into five bays. The lower level of the facade, which conforms to the steep Ninth Street grade, has received a minimum of elaboration - typical of a Renaissance, palazzo base. The central level of this elevation, equivalent to three stories in height, features a triple-arched blind arcade set within the three central bays. Each individual archway is punctuated by a pedimented, structural opening with a large ornamental cartouche above. These central bays are each framed by imposing, pseudo-Corinthian pilasters and half pilasters, full three stories in height. The blind arcade is solidly flanked by sparsely-decorated outermost bays. Structural openings on the same level as those of the central bays are capped with segmental-arched pediments. Five bracketed balconettes underline these openings, creating a strong horizontal course, which firmly ties the variant bays together. A heavily proportioned entablature repeats the-horizontal movement across the full five bays on this facade. The entablature has a simple architrave, festooned frieze, and cornice with a boldly projecting dentil course. A substantial parapet above the cornice is simply ornamented with raised terra cotta rosettes, and rectangles.

== Interior ==
1918| The theatre was designed as a combination office and Theatre. The setup of the main auditorium has seating accommodations for 900 with three boxes on each side.

In March 1976, a proposal was prepared for the “Adaptation of the Tacoma Pantages Theatre”, by Richard F. McCann, A.I. A. M.H. Company P. S. that prepared and did the architecture renovations is the joint practice of Richard F. McCann and George T. Howard, formerly associates of the late B. Marcus Priteca, F.A.I.A., since his passing in 1971, was the original architect of the starting of the Patanges. The stage area in 1976, was presented with a curtain line, the existing upstage wall is 26 ½ feet, with the playing area on stage is 34 feet.

The auditorium is elliptical, the proscenium arch and stage located on the south wall. The small orchestra pit can be entered through the greenroom below the stage. Dressing rooms flank the greenroom at that level. Because of the very steep grade on Ninth Street, large spaces below the auditorium level were available for rehearsals and storage. At the lowest level on Commerce Street, the heating and electrical systems were installed.

The Gridiron| In 1971 the gridiron was documented as an open steel flooring over the stage area, the gridiron was installed in order to support scenery and the rigging equipment necessary to “fly” or suspend this scenery within the stage area, to make access to rigging equipment easy, and safe. Iron weight was used to help support lighting border lights. The gridiron was framed to accommodate for hemp rigging. There were proposed plans to expand the gridiron completely covering the performing stage area.

The Pantages Theatre | Acoustics. Notably, in their orchestra pit configuration, the pit is under the soffit of the stage, allowing sound to flow from the aperture in between the pit rail and the edge of the forestage.

Additions to the theater| Roxy Theatre remodel; in 1955 tile ceilings were added for acoustics, terrazzo marble was added to the entrance, and glass panel doors and walls were updated. Custom-built entrance doors with polished aluminum frames with the doors being solid glass panels were included in the remodel for the grand opening of The Roxy.

Decorative features of the auditorium rely upon the lavish use of. The proscenium arch is covered with classical motifs executed in plaster by European craftsmen. At the center is an elaborate floral cartouche. Projecting from the cartouche is a torch. Fluted, engaged columns flank the proscenium. The auditorium's entablature has a dentil led cornice with shell finials. Above the entablature is the coved ceiling with gutter lighting. At the center of the ceiling is an art glass sunburst, instead of a traditional crystal chandelier. Boxes are located on either side in the ante-proscenium area. Each is an arch-shaped niche ornamented on its interior by rosettes and a large shell motif. The box entrance is enframed by a complex arrangement of pilasters, entablature, and broken pediment.

== History ==
In 1889 Tacoma’s Gross Bros. department store opened at its new location on 9th and Broadway, and was considered the finest department store in the Pacific Northwest. The business was bought in 1897 by businessman William Jones. C. 1916, an agreement was reached (of which documentation has been lost) between Jones and theatre mogul Alexander Pantages, leading to the demolition of the department store in 1916 and the construction of the Tacoma Pantages Theatre-Jones Building. The theatre was opened in 1918 as one theatre location in a circuit of Vaudeville Theatres. During this initial “Pantages” era, stage manager Carl Ellis and projectionist Clyde Ellis became known as the “Edisons of the Stage” for their revolutionary use of heat-resistant colored globes for vaudeville stage lighting, a system which became a model for other Pantages Theatres. Alexander Pantages owned the theatre until RKO Pictures purchased the Tacoma location as well as six other locations following bad publicity surrounding Pantage’s rape trial in 1929. After the RKO purchase, the theatre was later renamed the “RKO Orpheum” in 1930 to avoid association with Alexander Pantages. The RKO Orpheum continued vaudeville acts while adopting the showing of “talkies” or sound film, and musical orchestras. In 1932, the Orpheum failed to profit and Tacoma was in need of a film theater. The Orpheum was bought by John Hamrick and Ned Edris and renamed the “Roxy”. The Roxy lived as a film house with the occasional performance under the management of Will J. Conner, who renovated the venue to better suit motion pictures. Hamrick was bought out by Edris’ brother William after Ned’s death, and operated under the Edris Company Theater Division. Conner assumed majority ownership in 1959, and his Conner Corporation maintained the theatre until 1974. In 1974, the property was foreclosed upon, and in 1974 the City of Tacoma purchased the Roxy due to the need of a performing arts center and in 1975 registered the building as a historic site. The “Pantages” moniker was reinstated upon its grand reopening in 1983. Management changed in 2021 when ASM Global was chosen as the new management company. ASM signed a $2.4 million 11-year contract with the City of Tacoma. As of 2024, the Pantages theater is still an active performing arts center for the City of Tacoma (Tacoma City Theaters).

== Entertainment ==
The entertainment style of vaudeville acts at The Pantages were seen as an array of comedic styles such as tap dancing, comedy shows, ventriloquists, vocalists, and trick cyclists. The vaudeville acts thrived under Pantages ownership until 1930. Specific examples can be seen through orchestra, musical comedy, circus acts, and the occasional random appearance (Franklin D. Roosevelt in 1920). In 1929 the Pantages Theatre was bought by RKO Pictures (Radio Keith Orpheum) and was renamed the RKO Orpheum in 1930. The RKO Orpheum was open from 1929 to 1932. During this transition, the entertainment style changed to traditional singers, radio stars, organists, and silent film showings. Entertainment can be seen as radio shows, performances, and talkies. The Roxy was bought by John Hamrick and Ned Edris in 1932 to fulfill Tacoma’s need for a film theater. Between 1932-1975, the Roxy focused on showing films and the occasional performance. The Roxy was known for incorporating 3D aspects into their film showings. In the 1970s, the City of Tacoma was bought the theatre and declared it an historic site. The Roxy changed ownership and was reopened as The Pantages in 1979 and chartered as a traditional performance center. From 1979 to today The Pantages Theatre has put on performances in ballet, comedy, Broadway musicals, celebrity shows, orchestras, live musical concerts, and vaudeville revival.

Some performances shown at the Pantages Theatre (1918-1928) could be seen through the Ingleside Orchestra (10/24/1923), Singer Monte Carter (1918), and Vice Presidential nominee Franklin D. Roosevelt (1920). Silent films like Fast Life (1929) could be seen at the RKO Orpheum (1929- 1932). Film movies at The Roxy (1932-1975) such as House on a Haunted Hill (1959) and Tugboat Annie Sails Again (1940) were shown frequently. When the Pantages Theatre reopened in 1975 famous acts and people such as Della Reese (1959), Gregory Peck (1995), Debbie Reynolds (1998), Queen Latifa (2007), Chicago Musical (2013), Jeff Bridges (2014), Cabaret Shows (2017), Jerry Cantrell (2023), Matt Rife (2023), Dolly Parton (2023), Colin Jost (2024), John Cusack (2024), Kristin Chenoweth (2024), ARTMS (2024), Loossemble (2024) and Amy Grant (2025) perform to this day.

== Bibliography ==
- Richard F. McCann, A.I.A. - Adaptation of Tacoma Pantages Theatre - to serve the Existing Need for a City Center Performance Facility. M.H. Co. P.S. - Seattle and Hollywood, March, 1976, unpublished. (File Copy - City Clerk's Office)
- Bonney, W.P. A History of Pierce County. 3 vols. Chicago. Pioneer Historical Publishing Company. 1927
- Harvey, Paul W. Tacoma Headlines. Tacoma, Washington; The News Tribune, 1962
- Hunt, Herbert (1916). Tacoma Its History and Its Builders, A Half Century of Activity. Chicago, Illinois: S. J. Clarke Publishing Company. (Volume 2)
- Scully Jr., Vincent (1961). Modern Architecture. N.Y.: George Braziller. LCCN 61-13689. OCLC 710751.
- McCann, Richard F., A.I.A.: a series of conversations, personal interviews during January and February and March 1976
- Priteca, B. Marcus A.R.C.A., F.A.I.A.; Specifications for the Pantages/Jones Building, Tacoma, Washington dated September 1, 1916
- Seattle Post-Intelligencer, October 3, 1975, page A 7
- Blecha, Peter. Britten, Patsy (1923-2013), December 23, 2014. https://www.historylink.org/File/10977.
- Johnson, Blaine et al. Now Playing : Showtime in Tacoma. Tacoma, WA: Tacoma Historical Society Press, 2017. Print.
- Kamens, Brian G. Tacoma Pantages Theatre. Tacoma, Washington: Tacoma Public Library, 1990.
- Tacoma Public Library. n.d. “Marvin D. Boland Collection BOLAND-B8770.” Tacoma Public Library Digital Collections Northwest Room 36797.jpg. Accessed October 12, 2024
