= Dakota Business College =

Private college in Fargo, North Dakota, USA

Coordinates: 46.8741°N 96.7914°W

Dakota Business College was a small, private college in Fargo, North Dakota, United States. It was established in 1890 (136 years ago) by F. Leland Watkins and was still owned by the Watkins family when it closed in 1978 (48 years ago).

== See also ==
- Masonic Block (Fargo, North Dakota)
