= First Presbyterian Church (Hastings, Minnesota) =

Historic church in Minnesota, United States

- U.S. National Register of Historic Places
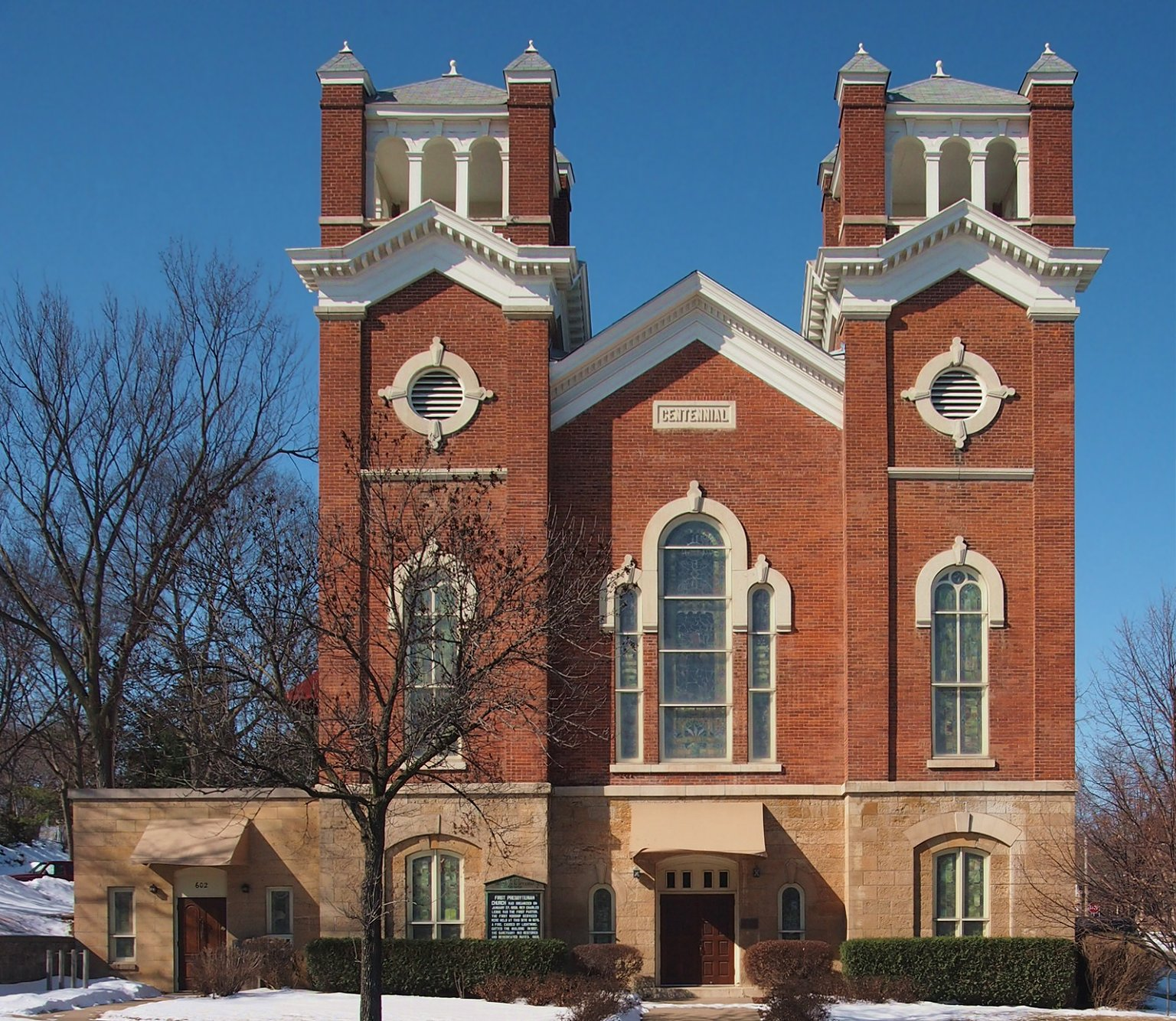
- First Presbyterian Church from the east

- Location within Minnesota Location within the United States
- Location: 602 Vermillion St., Hastings, Minnesota
- Coordinates: 44°44′24.4″N 92°51′11″W
- Area: less than one acre
- Built: 1876
- Architect: Charles Daniels, Harry Wild Jones
- Architectural style: Romanesque Revival
- NRHP reference No.: 95000822
- Added to NRHP: July 7, 1995

First Presbyterian Church, known also as First United Presbyterian Church, is a church located at 602 Vermillion Street in downtown Hastings, Minnesota, United States, listed on the National Register of Historic Places. It is significant for its Romanesque architecture. The building is characterized by its massive quality, its thick walls, round arches, large towers, and decorative arcading.

The congregation was established in 1855 by Reverend Charles LeDuc, the brother of William LeDuc. The congregation built a stone church at that time, then decided to build a new, larger church in 1875. It was designed by Charles N. Daniels. Because of financial difficulties, it took nearly seven years to finish the building, although it was complete enough to host its first services in 1881.

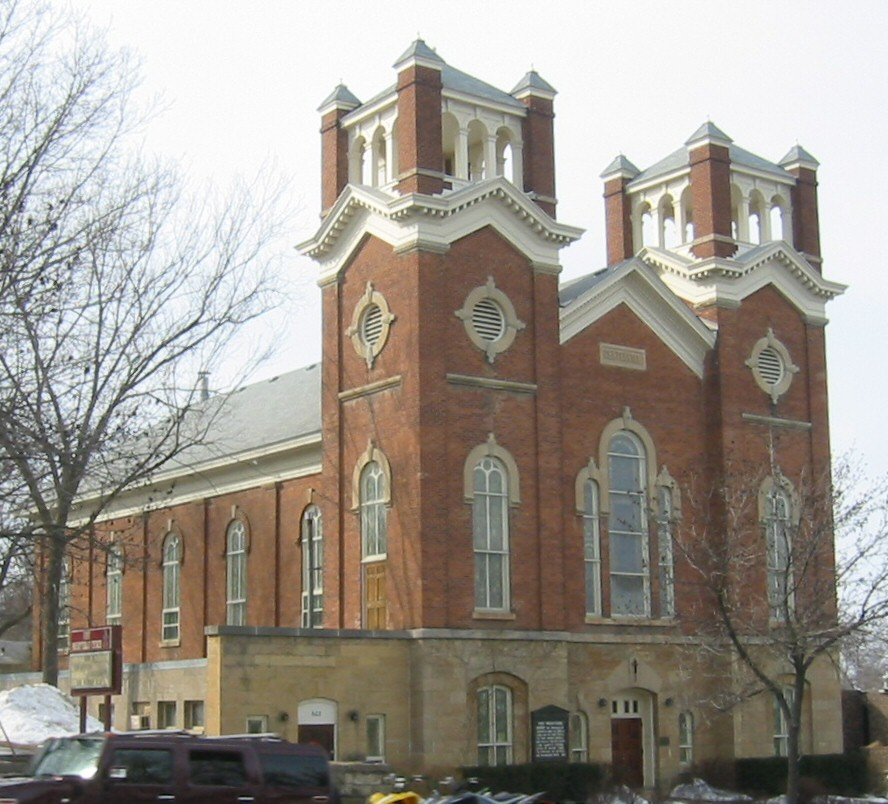
Perspective view

In 1907 the tall steeple was struck by lightning, which started a fire that left the church gutted. Architect Harry Wild Jones from Minneapolis was hired to design the restoration. He was asked to make the new church resemble the original as much as possible, so both the interior and the exterior are his work.

== See also ==
- National Register of Historic Places listings in Dakota County, Minnesota
