= C.C. Clement House =

Historic house in Minnesota, United States

- U.S. National Register of Historic Places
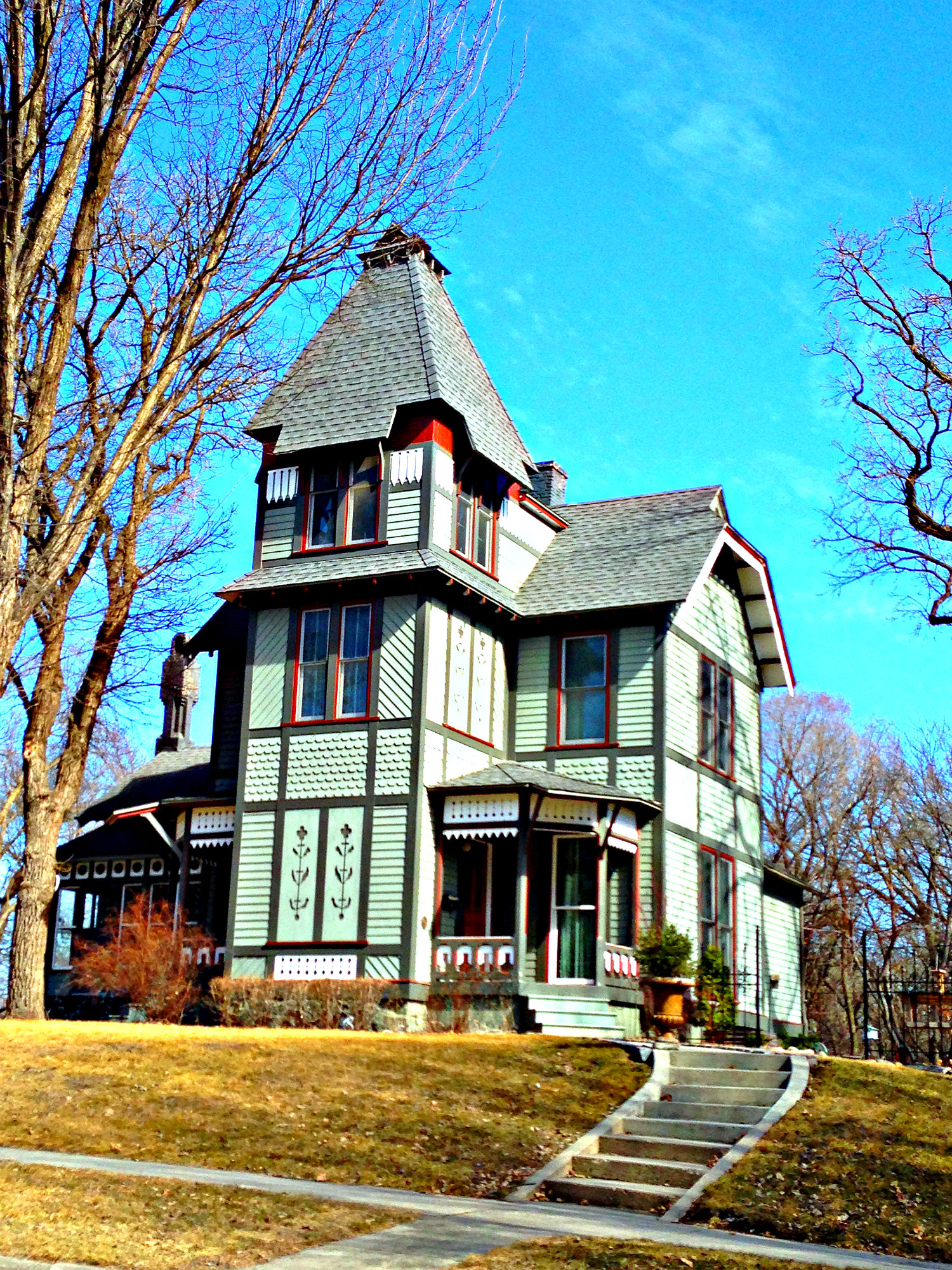

- Location within Minnesota Location within the United States
- Interactive map showing the location of C.C. Clement House
- Location: 608 N. Burlington Ave. Fergus Falls, Minnesota
- Coordinates: 46°17′20″N 96°03′48″W
- Area: less than one acre
- Built: 1882
- Built by: C.C. Clement
- Architect: Charles N. Daniels
- Architectural style: Stick/Eastlake
- NRHP reference No.: 86001485
- Added to NRHP: August 13, 1986

The C.C. Clement House is a historic building located in Fergus Falls, Minnesota, United States. Completed in 1882, the design of the 2½-story frame house was attributed to Fargo architect Charles N. Daniels. The picturesque Stick style dwelling features a steep gabled roof with jerkin head and eave bracing. Also indicative of the style is the articulation of the wall surfaces by panel divisions with vertical and diagonal forms that suggest the structural frame underneath. Stick decorative elements are found in the pierced eave boards, the porch frieze with a saw-tooth edge and cut-out panels, turned posts and the floral design panels on the tower. The house was built by C.C. Clement who managed the interests of George B. Wright, one of the original developers of Fergus Falls. It remained in the Clement family until 1948 when it was sold to Wendell Hubers. The house was listed on the National Register of Historic Places in 1986. It is currently a private residence.
