= Masonic Block (Fargo, North Dakota) =

- U.S. National Register of Historic Places
- U.S. Historic district – Contributing property
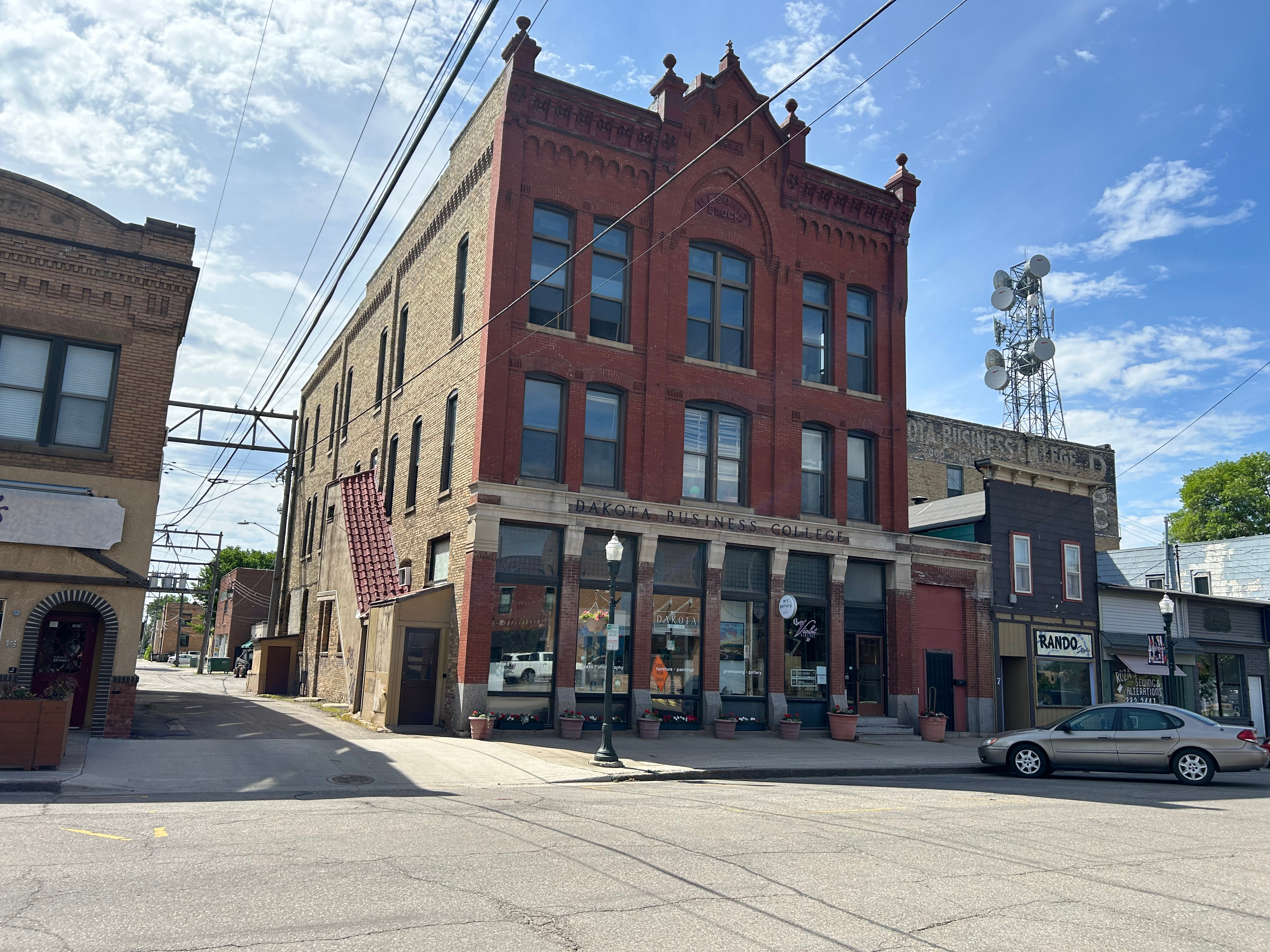

- Location within North Dakota Location within the United States
- Location: 11 S. 8th St., Fargo, North Dakota
- Coordinates: 46°51′55″N 96°47′29″W
- Area: less than one acre
- Built: 1884
- Built by: Andrew McHench
- Architect: Daniels & Proctor
- Architectural style: Early Commercial
- Part of: Downtown Fargo District (ID83004064)
- NRHP reference No.: 79001771

Significant dates
- Added to NRHP: August 3, 1979
- Designated CP: October 13, 1983

The Masonic Block in Fargo, North Dakota, also known as Dakota Business College or Watkins Block, is an Early Commercial style building built in 1884. It was designed by Fargo architects Daniels & Proctor.

The building gets its name from the fact that one of the original tenants of the building was a local Masonic lodge. The lodge rented the third floor of the building, which it used as a meeting hall (the lodge met in the building for only four years, from 1885 to 1889).

Despite the name, the building is better known for its subsequent educational function. It housed Fargo College from 1887 to 1890, and the Dakota Business College from 1891 to 1978.

Today it is used as a purely commercial building. It is one of few commercial structures in Fargo that survived a fire in 1893.

It was listed on the National Register of Historic Places in 1979. The listing included one contributing building, on an area of less than 1 acre (0.40 ha).
