= Blue Mouse Theatre =

The Blue Mouse Theatre title was used for several historic vaudeville and movie venues opened by John Hamrick in the Pacific Northwest of the United States. The name may have been inspired by a lounge in Paris. Hamrick is said to have used the colored rodential title for his first theatre in each city.

== Blue Mouse Theatre in Proctor District, Tacoma ==
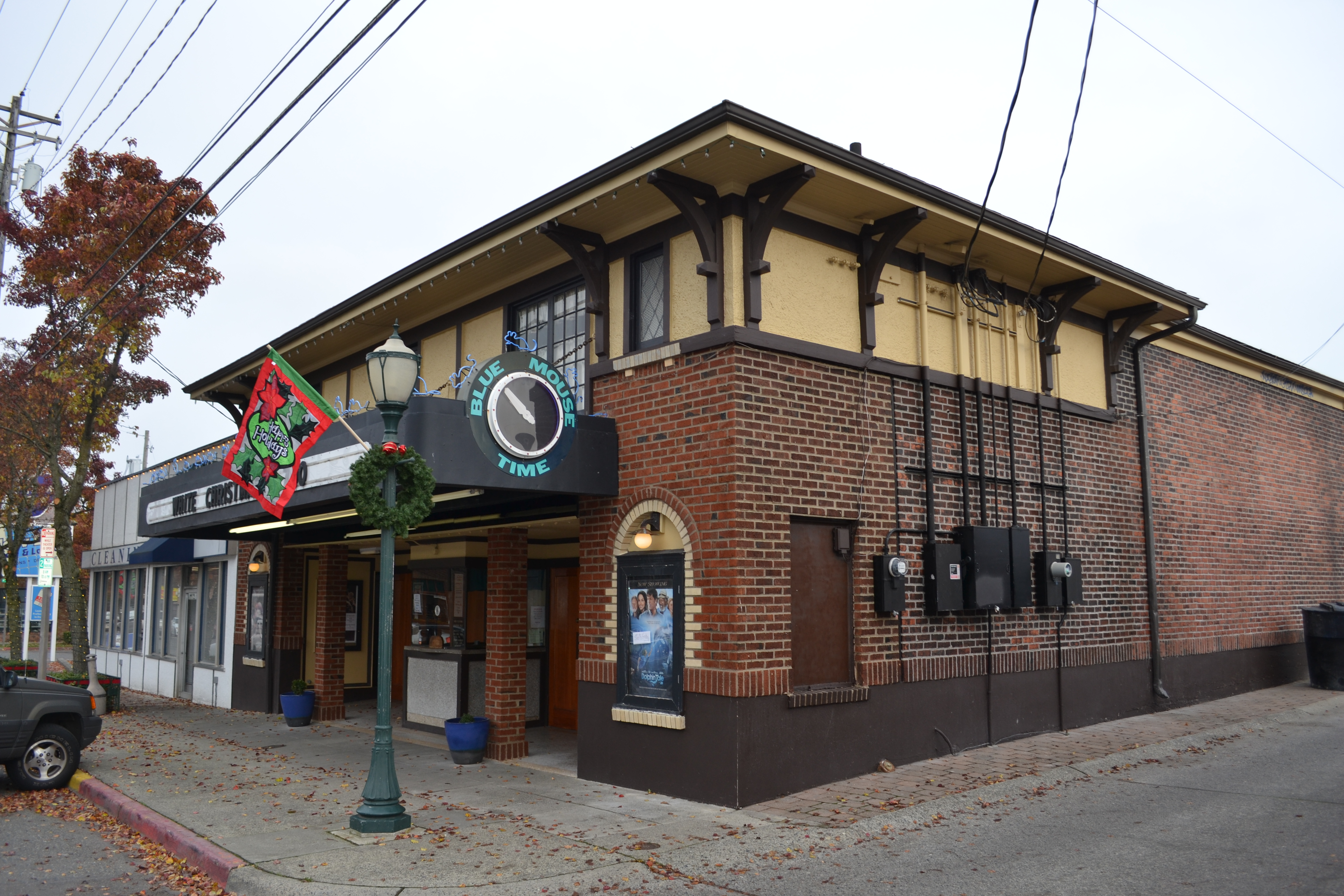

The Blue Mouse Theatre (1923) (originally known as Blue Mouse Jr.) is a small second-run movie theater located in the Proctor District in the north end of Tacoma, Washington. It is Washington's oldest continuously operating theater (a few blocks from the state's oldest bowling center), opened November 13, 1923.

When it was designed in the 1920s, the theater was promoted as being one of the finest suburban theaters and was referred to as "Blue Mouse Jr." to distinguish it from the larger downtown Tacoma theater of the same name. The "A spectacular melodrama" The Green Goddess may have been the first "picture show" shown on the theatre's "silent screen". By 1929, the theater was renamed the Proctor Street Theater, according to the Polk's City Directory for Tacoma. The theater was successful and in 1932 was sold. In 1972, it was re-purchased again and renamed the Bijou in 1980, but struggled to compete against area multiplexes and was threatened with becoming an office complex.

It was saved in 1993 by 17 activists and preservationists (the Blue Mouse Associates) who bought and restored "the building's original Craftsman-style timbers, stucco, pillars, marble terrazzo and original mahogany doors." The group renamed it back to the Blue Mouse Theatre and it has become a community attraction, showing popular movies on a second-run basis. The theater is partially supported by generous community donations. Tacoma glass artist Dale Chihuly designed neon blue mice "seen scurrying across the marquee" for the 221-seat theater. It is located at 2611 North Proctor Street in Tacoma.

On January 13, 2010, this Blue Mouse Theatre location was placed on the National Register of Historic Places in the United States.

== Blue Mouse Theatre in downtown Tacoma ==
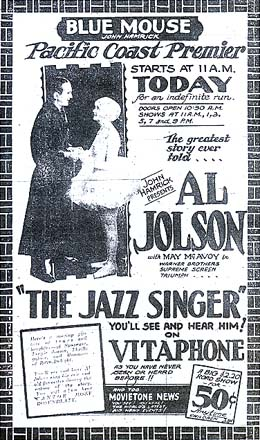
A 1928 newspaper ad for showings of The Jazz Singer at John Hamrick's Blue Mouse theater in downtown Tacoma.

The Blue Mouse in downtown Tacoma opened as the Apollo theater and had 650 seats. In 1922 it reopened as a Blue Mouse Theatre It was the first theater in Tacoma to show "talkies" and was done in by the city's "failed experiment" with moving sidewalks and was demolished in 1960 to make way for a new street escalator. Showings included The Jazz Singer in January 1928. It was located at 1131-1133 Broadway.

== Blue Mouse Theatre Portland ==
The Blue Mouse Theatre opened in Portland was at 1032 SW Washington Street. The location was originally opened as a Globe Theater in 1912, before being taken over and completely remodeled in 1921 by John Hamrick It used a wurlitzer organ shipped from the factory in 1922. Harry Quinn Mills was organist at the Blue Mouse in 1922 and Dubois Cornish was organist in 1927. According to Balcom & Vaughan records, the organ was last used for silent films in March 1928. The theater hosted the first sound picture in Portland in 1926: John Barrymore in Don Juan.

Hamrick-Evergreen Theatres closed the venue sometime around 1936 and it was reopened again in 1940 by Paul Forsythe, who "presented family films and kiddie matinees" and "was rewarded with success and a host of good patrons, young and old who became loyal Blue Mouse fans." The theater faced eviction when the property was sold, and the building was to be torn down.

The Blue Mouse Theatre signage was moved to the Capitol Theatre building downtown in 1958 (which had itself been closed down). The new location at 626 SW 4th St (also listed as Morrison and 4th Avenue, location of the former Capitol Theatre) was in a less upscale neighborhood, but stayed in business until 1977 when the "Blue Mouse Block" was demolished to "make way for a huge parking facility. According to one account, "There was a faint outcry to 'save the Blue Mouse' but even if it had been a mighty roar, it was to no more avail than the 'Save the Fox' campaign was in San Francisco in 1963."

== Blue Mouse Theatre Corvallis ==
The Blue Mouse Theatre in Corvallis, Oregon was built in 1921, and lasted only until 1923. It had a Wurlitzer organ and was a "tiny gem" of theater. The building is still standing at 106 NW 2nd Street and "looks like a theatre from the outside."

== Blue Mouse Theatre Seattle ==
The Blue Mouse Theatre in Seattle was constructed around 1920 and demolished in 1972 to make way for the construction of Peoples National Bank of Washington's "high-rise banking facility".
