= Puget Creek =

Urban creek in Washington

Coordinates: 47.2808°N 122.4776°W

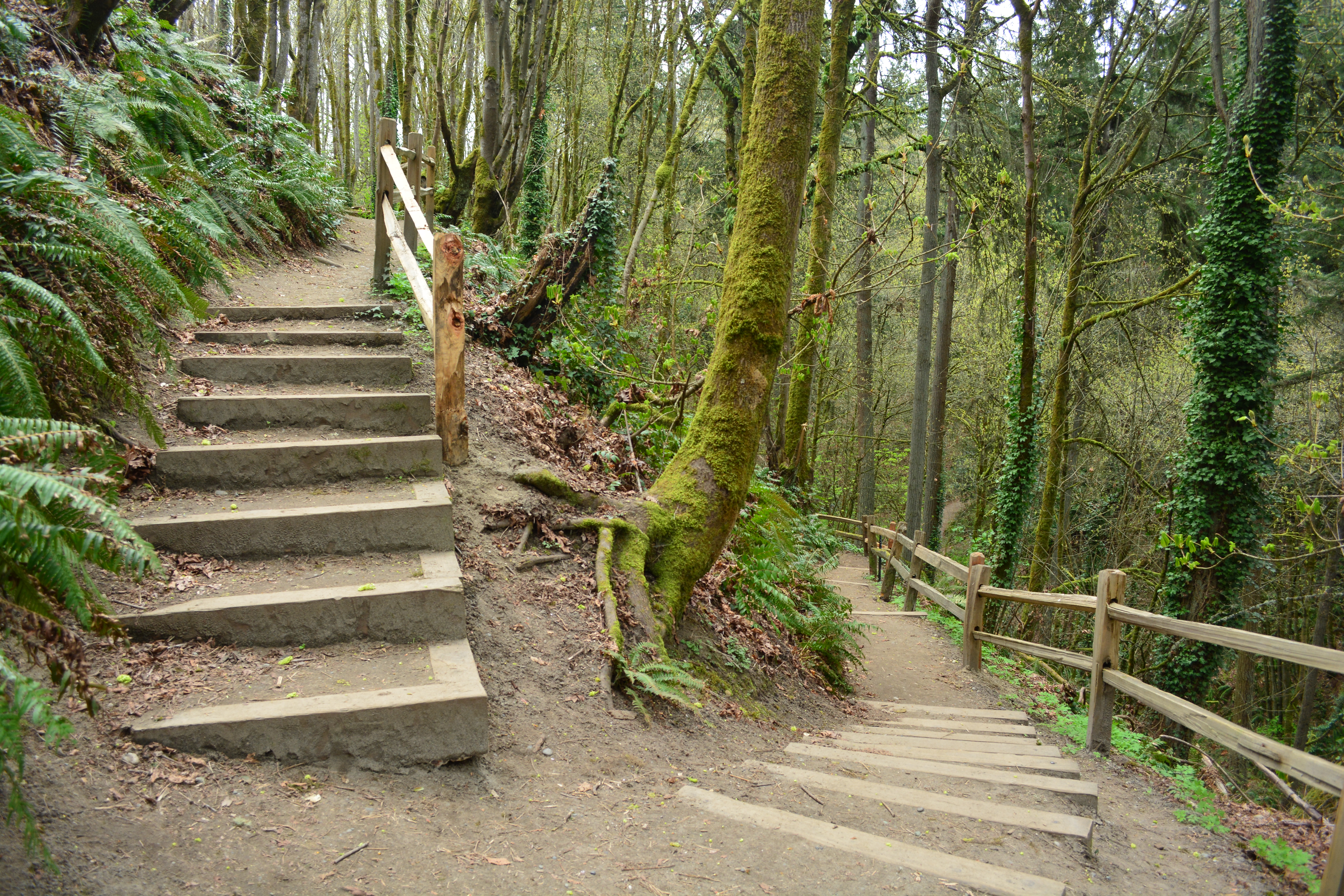
Trail down toward the creek from 31st & Proctor, Puget Creek Natural Area.

Puget Creek is a small urban creek in the U.S. state of Washington, in the north end of Tacoma, It rises in Puget Park and flows north to Commencement Bay, part of Puget Sound. Its course follows a steep ravine containing Puget Gardens Park. The creek's course is mostly contained within the 66-acre (270,000 m^{2}) natural area of Puget Gulch. Puget Creek is the focus of restoration work by the Puget Creek Restoration Society and community volunteers. One of the restoration goals is the reestablishment of regular runs of coho and chum salmon, as well as sea-run coastal cutthroat trout.

Puget Creek currently provides habitat for Chum and Coho salmon and Cutthroat trout. Over the years, several groups have worked to improve fish access and vegetative cover. Efforts to return salmon to the creek began in 1994 when salmon fry were released. To further encourage salmon to return, in-creek habitat has been (and continues to be) restored. In addition, The Puget Creek Restoration Society has had a salmon egg incubator installation since 2007.

Since 1987, volunteers have been working to restore these populations and improve the Puget Creek Natural Area. In 2000, the non-profit organization, Puget Creek Restoration Society (PCRS), was formed to help restore and raise awareness about the creek. As a continuation of their efforts, Metro Parks Tacoma's Management Plan is being established to help Metro Parks Tacoma guide the PCRS and other public and private interests and agencies in efforts to restore the Puget Creek Natural Area and raise awareness about the surrounding watershed.

The creek is one of only three potential salmon-bearing streams within the city of Tacoma. Restoration work in the late 1990s succeeded in helping salmon return. Coho and some chum salmon reportedly returned to spawn in Puget Creek in 2000, 2002, and 2003. citation from Metro Parks Tacoma Puget Creek Tacoma Natural Area Management Plan

The creek was named for Puget Park, which in turn was named for Peter Puget of the 1792 exploration and mapping of Puget Sound by the Vancouver Expedition.

== See also ==
- List of rivers of Washington (state)
