= John Hamrick =

American entrepreneur (1875–1956)

John Hamrick (1875 – 1956) was an American entrepreneur in the theater business. He leased and owned a large number of vaudeville and movie theaters in the Northwest from at least the early 1920s until the late 1940s. Hamrick lived in Seattle, Washington and eventually assembled a string of theaters that included the Rex Theatre, which he was in charge of as early as 1913. the Oriental Theatre in Portland, Oregon, the Beverly, several Blue Mouse Theatres (including one in downtown Tacoma, Washington and the Blue Mouse (Jr.) that is still open in Tacoma's Proctor District), the Music Box Theatre, the Riviera Theatre, and the Roxy Theatre. Hamrick also owned several theaters in Seattle and is generally credited as being the first Seattle theater owner to show "talking pictures."

The Oriental Theatre in Portland had 2,500 seats and in 1932 tickets cost 25-35 cents. Offerings included horror movies such as White Zombie. The Blue Mouse Theatre in Tacoma had 650 seats and brought in $2,100 during White Zombie's one-week run.

== Blue Mouse ==
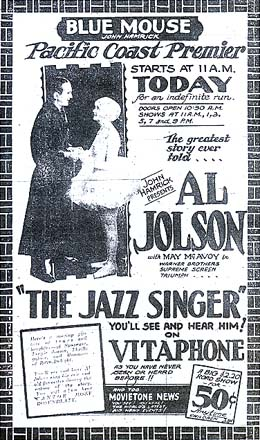
A 1928 newspaper ad for showings of The Jazz Singer at John Hamrick's Blue Mouse theater in downtown Tacoma

Some of Hamrick's theaters were named Blue Mouse. The silent movie The Grub Stake played at Hamrick's Blue Mouse theaters. His company had theaters in Tacoma, Washington including the Proctor Street Blue Mouse Theater (called Blue Mouse Jr. to distinguish it from the one in downtown Tacoma) that has been in continuous operation (except during renovations) since 1923. The theater was may have been named after one in Paris, France that Hamrick attended in 1919. Fitzherbert Leather, an architect from London, designed the "garden style arts and crafts" building and it was built by Henry Sanstrom for $20,000. Movies were changed three times a week by manager George C. Greenlund.

Theater chain growth was reported during 1922 when Hamrick "bought the Apollo at 11th Street and Broadway, renamed it the Blue Mouse, then opened the Blue Mouse..."

Hamrick's Blue Mouse Theatre in downtown Portland was reported to be "a 1960 victim of Tacoma's regrettable experiment with moving sidewalks." The Blue Mouse (Jr.) was recently restored and is being proposed for historical landmark status.

== Other theaters ==
Hamrick reopened Seattle's vaudeville film showcase the Orpheum Theater (built 1927) in 1934, after it was closed for nearly a year. He "engaged film comedians Bert Wheeler…and Robert Woolsey…for a personal appearance at the Orpheum, a popular move that helped revive the house's fortunes, however briefly" while "also attempting to revive the ailing Music Hall Theatre just a couple of blocks away." The Orpheum was torn in 1967 to make way for the Washington Plaza Hotel (now the Westin Hotel). The theater had the "largest theater vault in the world, containing a money chest weighing 1,500 pounds that would put Treasure Island pirates to shame" and its furnishings and decorations were auctioned.

Hamrick took over the Globe Theater, built in 1912, at 11th and Washington Streets in downtown Portland, remodeling it and reopening it as the Blue Mouse on November 28, 1921. "In each Northwest city, when the Hamrick chain came in and established themselves, their first house was always called the Blue Mouse..." according to one theory, " Mr. and Mrs. Hamrick were visiting in London where they attended a musical play titled 'The Blue Mouse'… They were so entranced by the play that they thereafter named their theatres Blue Mouse… There was also a Shubert production of "The Blue Mouse"."

In 1934, Hamrick announced plans to include Tacoma, Washington in a vaudeville circuit.

== Political activities ==
A February 4, 1933 article in Ellensburg, Washington's Daily Record quotes Hamrick as one of the business leaders opposed to a proposed Washington State tax measure at a meeting in Olympia, Washington. Hamrick was one of those representing the motion picture industry in speaking out against the luxury, occupational and business tax measures during a six-hour meeting. John R. Jones, a Democrat from Okanagan and chairman of the house revenue and taxation committee, conducted the hearing.

Hamrick said, "We don't think we are a luxury. It isn't fair to tax one industry and not another." He recommended a one- or two-percent tax on grosses at all businesses instead. Frank Newman, owner of 50 theaters in Oregon, Washington, and Montana, said the tax would close "most of the showhouses in the state" and said the businesses were not taking in enough money to cover expenses. Smaller theater owners agreed, noting that the number of theaters in the state declined from 472 in 1930 to 212 at the time of the meeting.

== Hamrick residences ==
The John and Fannie Hamrick residence in Seattle's Broadmoor neighborhood (constructed 1929-30) was designed by the Seattle partnership Bain & Pries in a Spanish eclectic style. Bain & Pries design partner Lionel H. Pries was deeply involved in all aspects of the design, which, at the time was characterized as "Santa Barbara Spanish." The house has complex rooflines, few windows (in favor of interior courtyards) and an interior with "exposed beams, arched openings", and thick walls. Decorative carvings and paintings adorn the beams, lighting fixtures are made of hammered metal, and tiled steps lead to a sunken living room. It may have been designed to evoke aspects of the Hollywood film industry. The house was said to evoke the Spanish Renaissance design motifs of his Music Box Theatre with "wrought iron balconies and gates, round stair tower," stenciled beams, heraldic shields, and cast-stone fireplace.

Hamrick also had a house in the "Little Tuscany" area of Palm Springs, California. It was built by 1942 and featured in California Pictorial Magazine's Spring edition showing "photographs of it by Maynard L. Parker, with interiors by decorator R.D. Harrell and featuring furnishings by Barker Brothers of Los Angeles." The text read: "the entire effect of the house is light, high-spirited, gay and cheerful, a faithful reflection of the mood of the desert resort." The Hamricks were said to have commissioned Alber Frey and John Porter Clark to add a sun room – or lanai in 1947, and several rooms were reportedly redesigned by Arthur Elrod, a local interior designer, in 1956-57.

== Personal life ==
Hamrick was buried at the Acacia Memorial Park in Lake Forest Park, King County, Washington.

Hamrick, his 11-year-old daughter and another girl were also involved in a car accident in 1920, during a period when he was proprietor of the Rex theater. The car, being driven by Hamrick, plunged downhill, over sidewalks and embankments, and crashed into the house of Hans P. Fogh on Howell Street tearing "through the wall into the house, brining [sic] up against a piano". No one was injured, although "five were endangered", including Miss Anna Fogh who was thrown from a couch, and damage to the residence was estimated at $1,500 with $100 of damage to the automobile.

== Theaters ==
- Temple Theater (1932), also known as Masonic Temple Building, Heilig's Theater, John Hamrick's Temple Theater, 47 St. Helens Ave., Tacoma, Washington. Designed by Ambrose J. Russell and listed on the National Register of Historic Places, 1993
- Blue Mouse Theater downtown Tacoma, Washington
- Blue Mouse Theatre (originally known as Blue Mouse Jr.) in Proctor District of Tacoma, Washington's oldest continuously operating theater.
- Blue Mouse Theatre Portland, Oregon. Opened in the Globe Theater (1912) after a complete remodel (1921). Moved with signage to the Capitol Theatre building in 1958. Demolished 1977.
- Blue Mouse Theatre Corvallis, Oregon. (1921) Closed 1923.
- Blue Mouse Theatre Seattle (1920) Demolished in 1970.
- Arlene Schnitzer Concert Hall purchased existing theater to be part of Evergreen theater chain in 1936.
- Music Box Theatre Tacoma, Nebraska. (1927)
- Egyptian Theater in University District, Seattle.
