= North Tacoma, Tacoma, Washington =

Neighborhood in Tacoma, Washington, United States

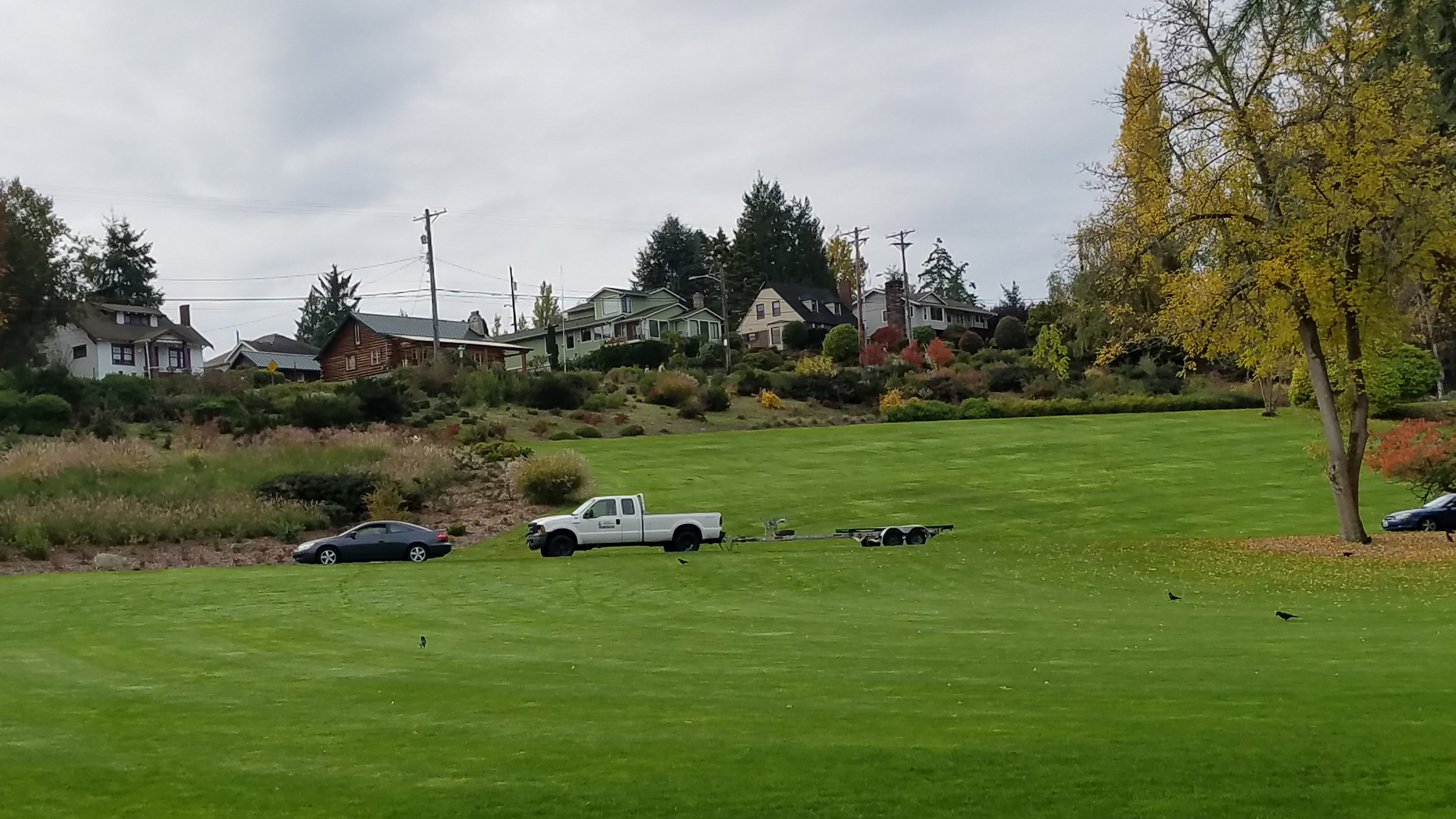
Homes bordering Point Defiance Park

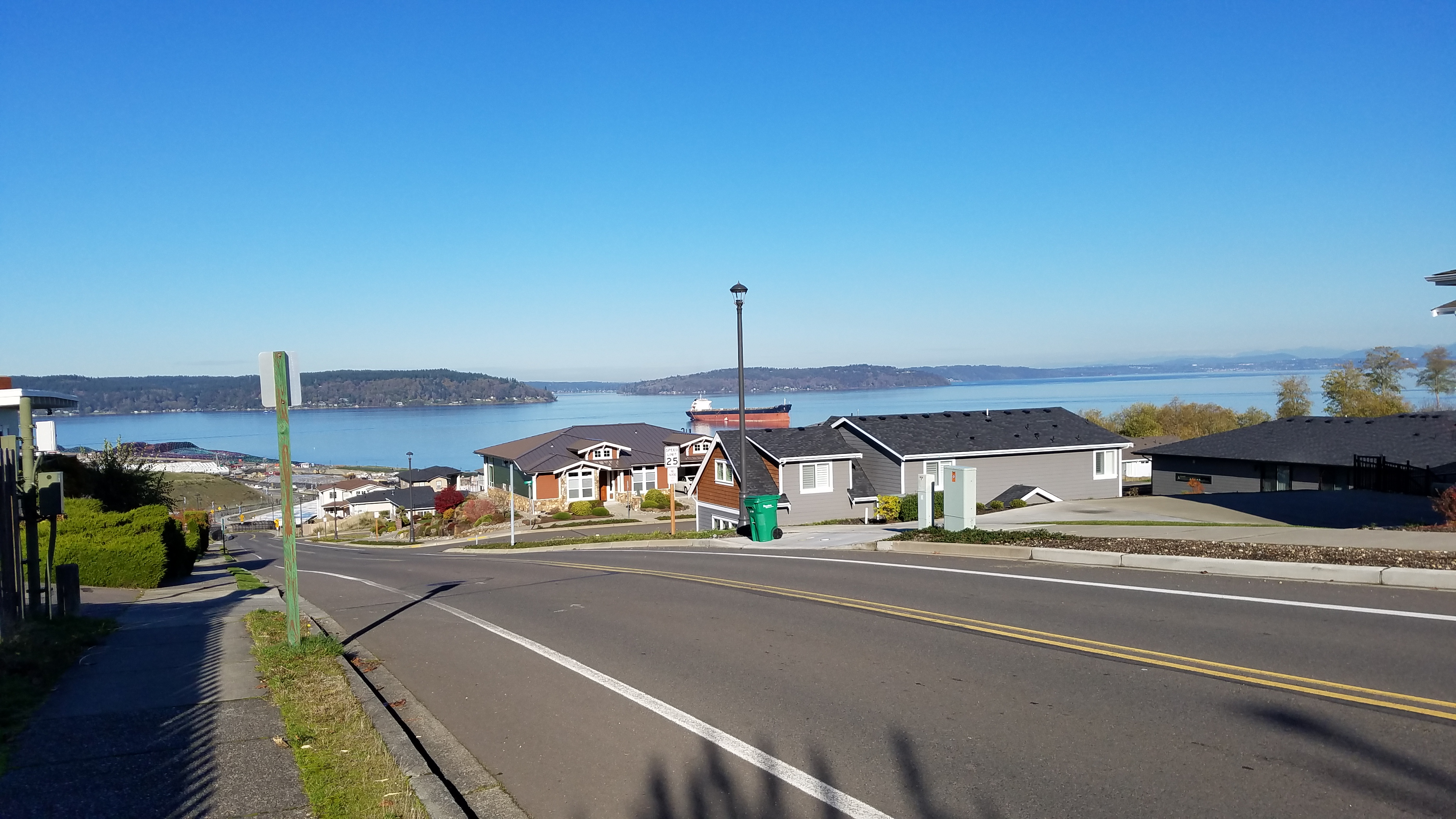
Neighborhood at Stack Hill, above Point Ruston

North Tacoma (also called the North End) is a neighborhood in Tacoma, Washington, in the United States. The area is most known for waterfront parks and restaurants, Point Defiance Park, the University of Puget Sound, Stadium High School, and the Tacoma Narrows Bridge.

== Background ==
The North End of Tacoma has informal and formal boundaries. Informally, the generally accepted boundaries of the North End are 6th Avenue and Division Avenue to the south and Puget Sound to the north, west, and east. Although the independent city of Ruston is not legally a part of the city of Tacoma, most residents of Ruston self-identify as being from Tacoma. Formally, the city has designations for each of the eight neighborhoods which are represented by neighborhood councils. These designations are not generally known, but they are marked on city streets by special signs. For the North End, 6th Ave forms the boundary on the south and southeast to 4th St., Puget Sound which runs NE to North, 46th St. on the North to Huson, and back down to 6th on the South. While much of the West End and some the Central District (such as the Stadium District) are identified with the informal boundaries of the North End, the City of Tacoma identifies these area as separate for purposes of representation and planning.

The main commercial areas are along Sixth Ave and in the Proctor District and Old Town. The Sixth Ave corridor, Old Town and the Proctor District, have a variety of independent restaurants and shops.

Although the area has a traditional heritage of lower middle class residents such as fisherman and ASARCO plant workers (before it was demolished in 1993), the community has a small-town feel. Most north end residents still work in Tacoma as evidenced by commute time figures from the 2000 Census.

The waterfront, specifically around Old Tacoma has undergone redevelopment in recent years.

North Tacoma votes heavily Democratic on federal, state, and local areas, with all precincts giving sizable victories to John Kerry in the 2004 Presidential election, Barack Obama in 2008, and U.S. Senator Patty Murray in 2010.

== Neighborhoods ==
- Buckley Addition
- College Park National Historic District
- North Slope
- Old Tacoma
- Proctor District
- Ruston (independent town)
- Ruston Way
- Skyline
- Stadium District
- Yakima Hill

== Parks ==
- Baltimore Park
- Commencement Park
- Cummings Park
- Dickman Mill Park
- Garfield Park
- Hamilton Park
- Jack Hyde Park
- Jane Clark Playfield
- Jefferson Park
- Kandle Park
- Les Davis Pier/Marine Park
- North Slope Historic Park
- Old Town Dock
- Old Town Park
- Optimist Park
- Point Defiance Park
- Proctor Community Garden
- Puget Gardens Park
- Puget Park
- Ruston Way Park
- Titlow Park
- Ursich Gulch
- Vassault Playfield
- War Memorial Park

== Education ==
=== Public elementary schools ===
- Downing Elementary School
- Grant Elementary School
- Jefferson Elementary School
- Lowell Elementary School
- Point Defiance Elementary School
- Sherman Elementary School
- Skyline Elementary School
- Washington-Hoyt Elementary School

=== Public middle schools ===
- Jason Lee Middle School
- Mason Middle School
- Truman Middle School

=== Public high schools ===
- Silas High School
- Stadium High School

=== Private schools ===
- Annie Wright School
- Saint Patrick Catholic School

=== Universities ===
- University of Puget Sound

== Other landmarks ==
- Blue Mouse Theatre
- Commencement Bay
- Cushman Substation & Towers
- Engine House No. 9 (Tacoma, Washington)
- Fire Station 13
- Fort Nisqually
- Old Woman's Gulch
- Point Defiance Zoo & Aquarium
- Puget Creek
- Tacoma Narrows Bridge
- Washington School
- College Park National Historic District
