= Congregational Church of Faribault =

Historic church in Minnesota, United States

- U.S. National Register of Historic Places
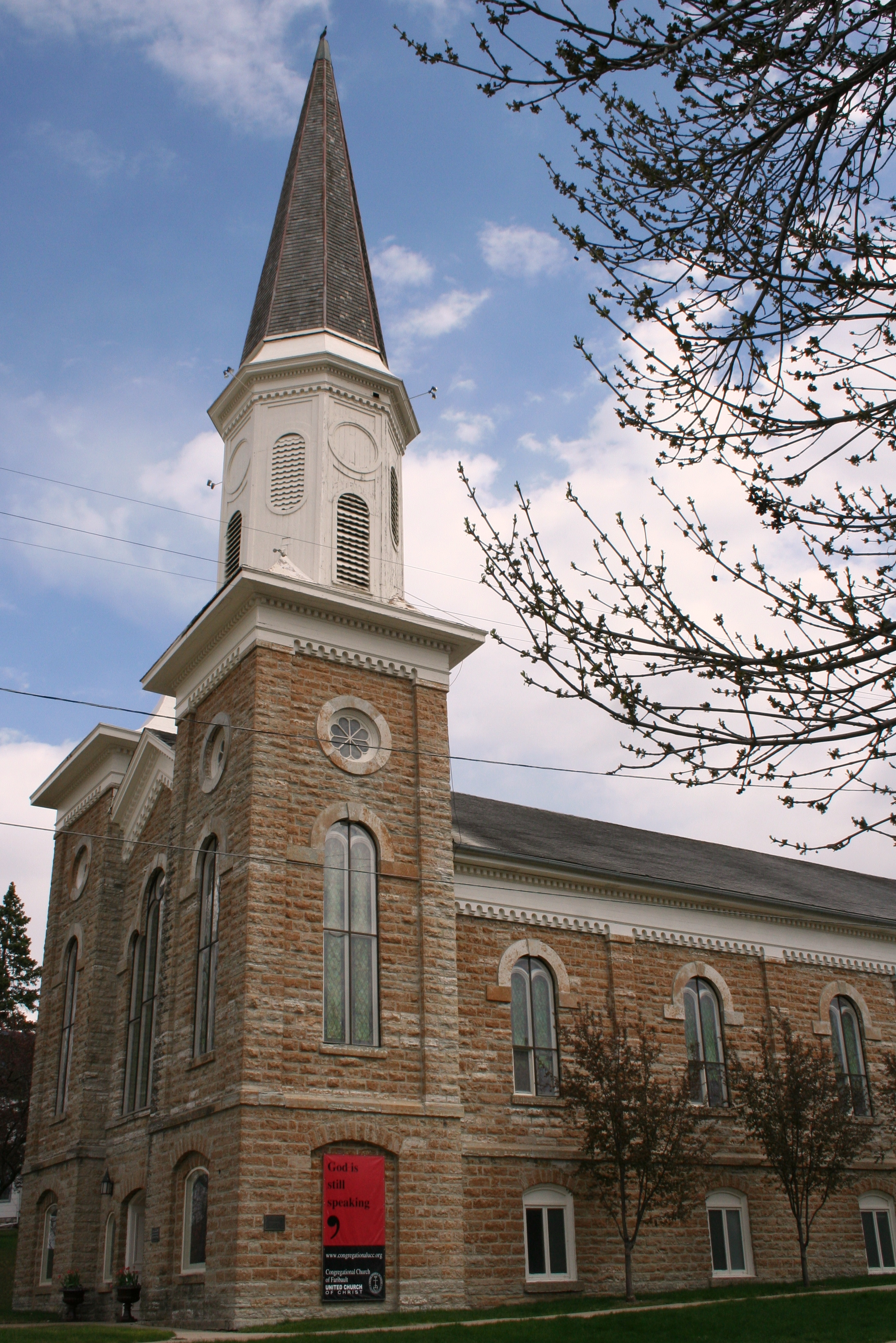

- Location within Minnesota Location within the United States
- Location: 227 3rd St., NW, Faribault, Minnesota
- Coordinates: 44°17′36″N 93°16′21″W
- Area: less than one acre
- Built: 1867
- Architects: Monroe Sheire; Rice & Daniels
- Architectural style: Romanesque
- NRHP reference No.: 77000768
- Added to NRHP: May 12, 1977

Congregational Church of Faribault (also known as the Plymouth Church) is a historic church at 227 3rd Street, NW in Faribault, Minnesota, United States. It was built in 1867 and was added to the National Register of Historic Places in 1977. James Strong served as their minister before becoming the first President of Carleton College.
