= George Batchelder House =

Historic house in Massachusetts, United States

- U.S. National Register of Historic Places
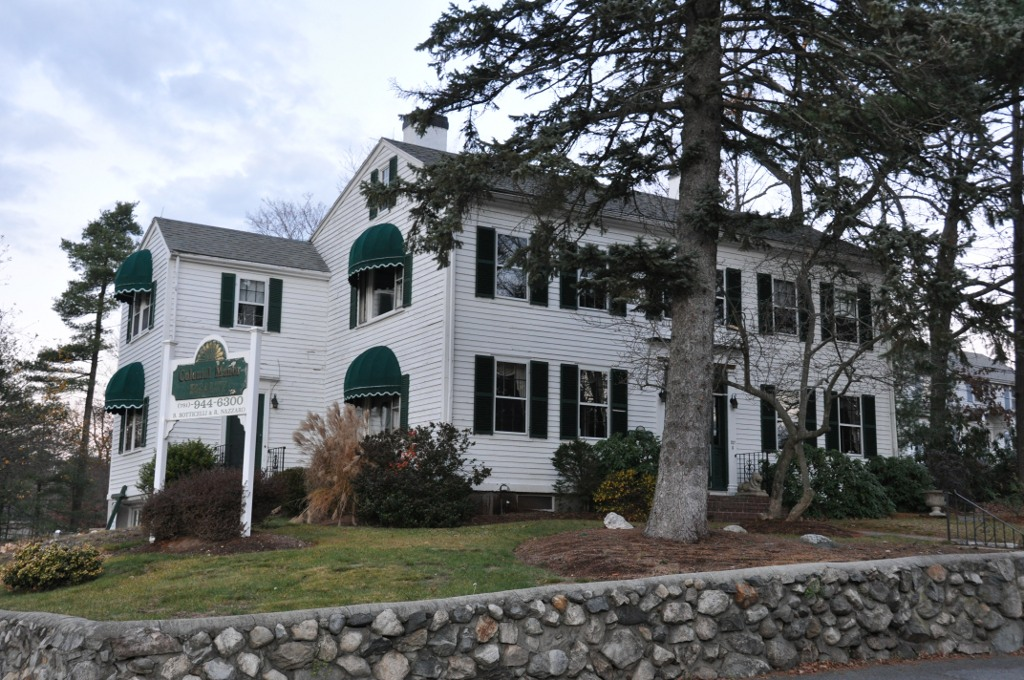

- Location within Massachusetts Location within the United States
- Location: 127–129 Franklin St., Reading, Massachusetts
- Coordinates: 42°33′15″N 71°6′18″W
- Built: 1825
- Architectural style: Federal
- MPS: Reading MRA
- NRHP reference No.: 84002496
- Added to NRHP: July 19, 1984

The George Batchelder House is a historic house in Reading, Massachusetts. Built in 1825, it is a prominent local example of Federal period architecture. It was listed on the National Register of Historic Places in 1984. It currently houses professional offices.

== Description and history ==
The George Batchelder House stands in northern Reading, on the north side of Franklin Street just east of its junction with Main Street (Massachusetts Route 28). The house was originally oriented facing Main Street, and was moved a short distance to its present location in 1947. It is a 2 1/2-story wood-frame structure, with a side low-pitch gable roof, two interior chimneys, and a clapboarded exterior. The house exhibits a few more high-style Federal period details than are typical for surviving houses in Reading of the period, including an elaborate entrance surround with tapered pilasters, sidelight windows, and a half-oval starburst louver above.

The house was built in 1825 on land that had long belonged to the locally prominent Batchelder family. George Batchelder, for whom it was built, grew up in the Nathaniel Batchelder House, a short way east of this house. This house originally faced Main Street, with a barn across that street. The barn is since demolished, and the house was moved in 1947 to make room for a gas station.

== See also ==
- National Register of Historic Places listings in Reading, Massachusetts
- National Register of Historic Places listings in Middlesex County, Massachusetts
