= Batchelder's Block =

- U.S. National Register of Historic Places
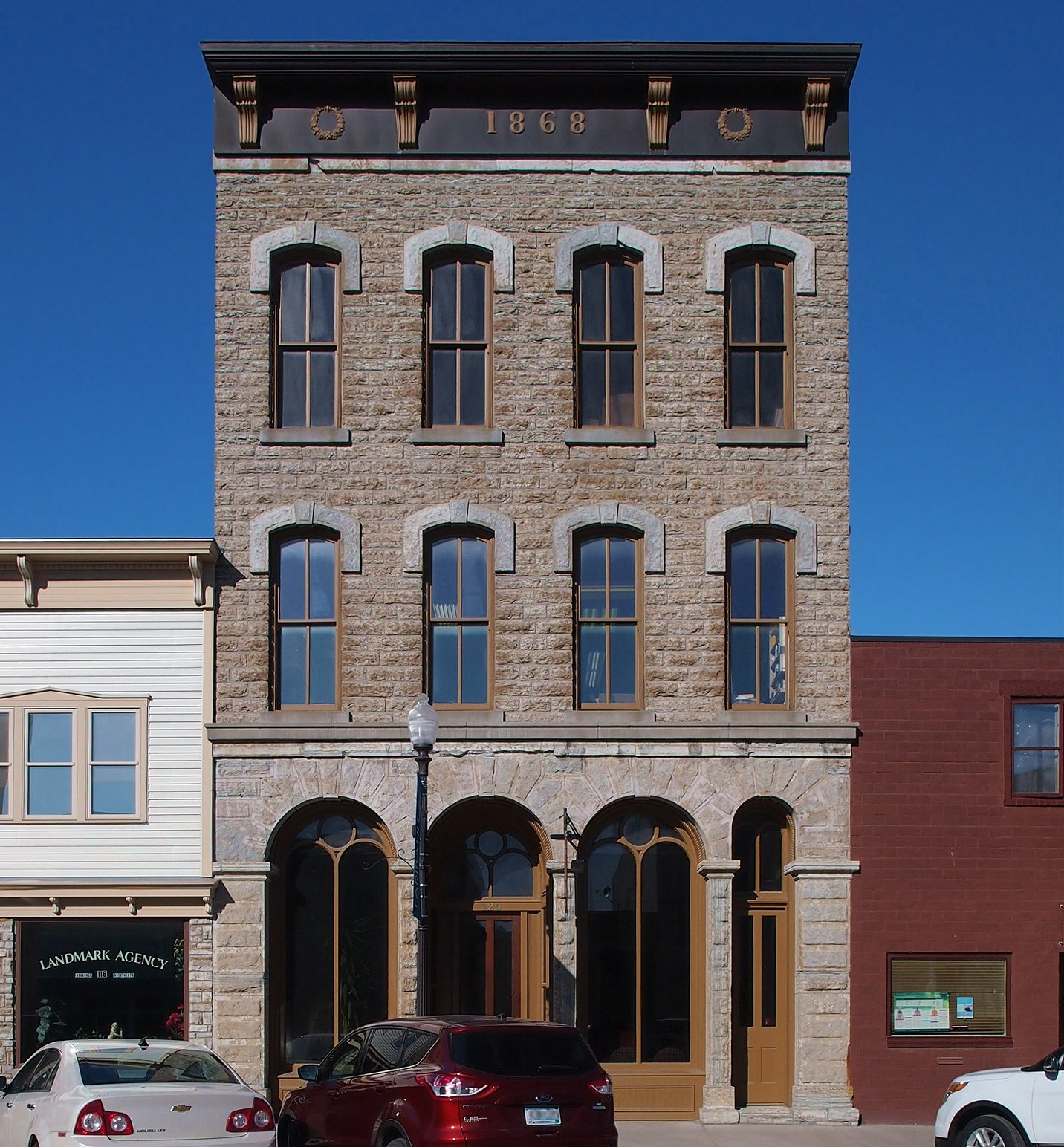
- Batchelder's Block from the east

- Location within Minnesota Location within the United States
- Location: 120 Central Avenue N, Faribault, Minnesota
- Coordinates: 44°17′31.5″N 93°16′7″W
- Area: Less than one acre
- Built: 1868
- Built by: Rice and Daniels
- Architect: Charles N. Daniels
- Architectural style: Italianate
- NRHP reference No.: 90001089
- Added to NRHP: July 12, 1990

Batchelder's Block is the second-oldest surviving commercial building in Faribault, Minnesota, United States; constructed in 1868. It was listed on the National Register of Historic Places in 1990 for having local significance in the themes of architecture and commerce. It was nominated for its associations with Faribault's early commercial development and the city's emergence as a regional commercial center, and for being a well-preserved example of Faribault's early commercial architecture.

== Description ==
Batchelder's Block is a narrow, three-story building 28 feet (8.5 m) wide and 80 feet (24 m) long. It was constructed with locally quarried limestone in a particularly fine Italianate design by local architect Charles N. Daniels. The only older commercial building still standing in Faribault is the 1865 Heinrick Building, though that structure has been architecturally modified while Batchelder's Block retains "a very high degree" of historical integrity. Batchelder's Block was the first three-story building in Faribault, and the first to include a pulley-operated elevator.

== History ==
Entrepreneur George F. Batchelder commissioned the building in 1868. He operated a dry goods shop on the first floor and a carpet shop on the second. The third floor was contained office space, and was leased for many years by the Congress of Industrial Organizations, the first labor union active in Faribault.

== See also ==
- National Register of Historic Places listings in Rice County, Minnesota
