= Nathaniel Batchelder House =

Historic house in Massachusetts, United States

- U.S. National Register of Historic Places
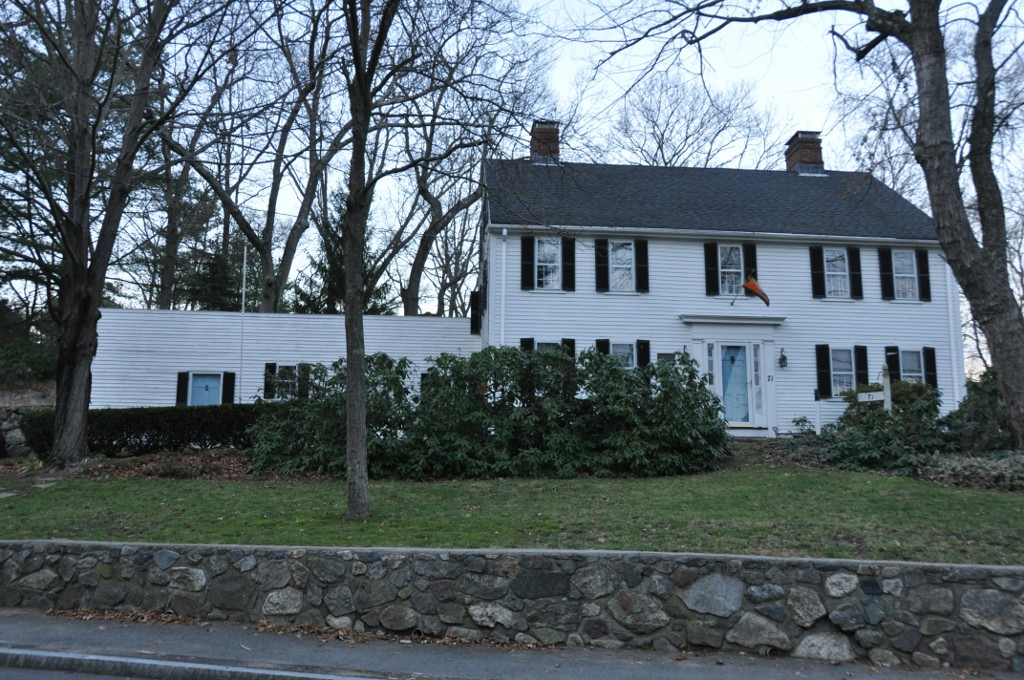

- Location within Massachusetts Location within the United States
- Location: 71 Franklin St., Reading, Massachusetts
- Coordinates: 42°33′15″N 71°6′3″W
- Built: 1765
- Architectural style: Georgian
- MPS: Reading MRA
- NRHP reference No.: 84002503
- Added to NRHP: July 19, 1984

The Nathaniel Batchelder House is a historic house at 71 Franklin Street in Reading, Massachusetts. Built sometime between 1753 and 1765, it is a prominent local example of Georgian architecture. It is also significant for its association with several members of the locally prominent Batchelder family. It was listed on the National Register of Historic Places in 1984.

== Description and history ==
The Nathaniel Batchelder House stands in a residential area of northern Reading, on the north side of Franklin Street just east of its junction with Pearl Street. It is a 2 1/2-story timber-frame structure, with a side-gable roof, two interior chimneys, clapboarded exterior, and stone foundation. Its main facade is five bays wide, with a center entrance framed by sidelight windows, pilasters, and a tall corniced entablature. Its upper-floor windows are set butting against the eave, a typical Georgian feature.

The house was built sometime between 1753 and 1765 by Nathaniel Batchelder, Jr., probably later in the period following his father's death in 1763 when the family property was divided. The Batchelders were a prominent local family, and this house remained in the family until 1971. A mid-19th century descendant was "Master John" Batchelder, who was well known locally as a school teacher, town selectman, and state representative. John's great-great-great-grandniece Bernice, who also lived in this house, was a professor of Education at Ashland State Teachers College in Ohio.

== See also ==
- Batchelder House (Reading, Massachusetts), built on the site of the elder Nathaniel Batchelder's house, just across the street
- National Register of Historic Places listings in Reading, Massachusetts
- National Register of Historic Places listings in Middlesex County, Massachusetts
