= Alden Batchelder House =

Historic house in Massachusetts, United States

- U.S. National Register of Historic Places
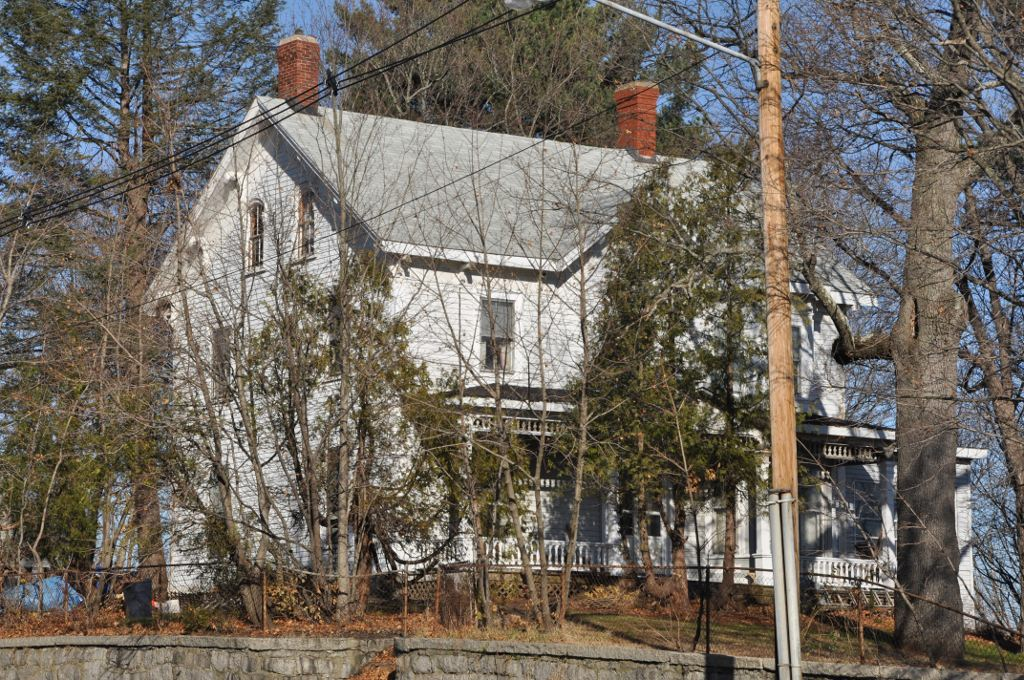

- Location within Massachusetts Location within the United States
- Location: 797 Main St., Reading, Massachusetts
- Coordinates: 42°31′42″N 71°6′11″W
- Built: 1849
- Architectural style: Italianate
- MPS: Reading MRA
- NRHP reference No.: 84002491
- Added to NRHP: July 19, 1984

The Alden Batchelder House is a historic house in Reading, Massachusetts. Built in the early 1850s, it is an excellent example of an early Italianate design. It was listed on the National Register of Historic Places in 1984.

== Description and history ==
The Alden Batchelder House stands north of downtown Reading, on a triangular parcel of land at the junction of Main Street (Massachusetts Route 28) and Charles Street, across Main Street from the Laurel Hill Cemetery. It is a 2 1/2-story wood-frame structure, with a side-gable roof and clapboarded exterior. It is oriented facing south, and is screened from the streets on either side by trees; a stone retaining wall lines the properties eastern and western sides. The roof has relatively deep eaves, studded with a few single decorative brackets. At the center of the main facade there is a gable at the roof line, which is echoed in the roof of the single-story porch, which wraps around the side of the house. The porch features turned balusters and posts. The first-floor windows are elongated, with deep moldings.

The house was built in 1849 by Alden Batchelder, and represents an early form of the Italianate style. The house has a basically Georgian or Federal form, but its decorative elements are clearly Italianate. Alden Batchelder was a local cabinetmaker, a common trade in the town at the time. His business was successful, employing 25 workers in 1864. It was destroyed by fire in 1876, after which he moved the business to Charlestown, where he employed prisoners from the Charlestown State Prison.

== See also ==
- National Register of Historic Places listings in Reading, Massachusetts
- National Register of Historic Places listings in Middlesex County, Massachusetts
