= North Slope, Tacoma, Washington =

- North Slope Historic District
- U.S. National Register of Historic Places
- U.S. Historic district
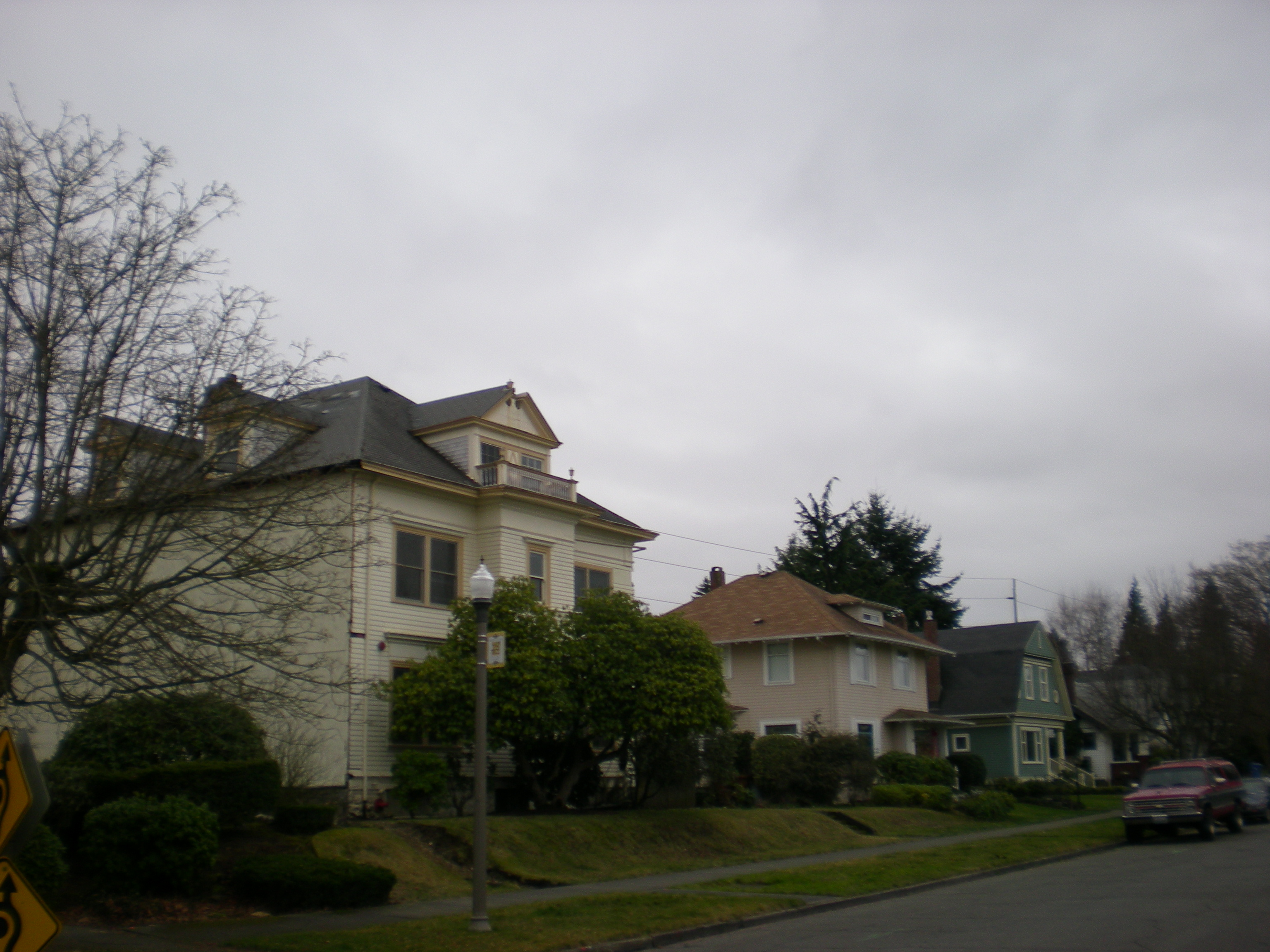
- Houses on North Slope

- Location within Washington (state) Location within the United States
- Location: Area bounded by Division Ave., N. Grant Ave, N. Steele St., and N I St., Tacoma, Washington
- Area: 228 acres (92 ha)
- Architectural style: Late Victorian, Late 19th And 20th Century Revivals, et al.
- NRHP reference No.: 03000160
- Added to NRHP: March 28, 2003

The North Slope is a neighborhood of the north end of Tacoma, Washington, located south of Yakima Hill.

== Background ==
Although there is no truly defined boundary for the North Slope, and it overlaps with Yakima Hill under some definitions, the area typically is considered to border North I Street on the northeast, Division Avenue on the southeast, and North Steele Street on the west. This area is known as the North Slope because it is both (mostly) at a slope and because the streets within it are at a slant relative to the grid of the rest of North Tacoma. Two streets, North State Street and North Trafton Street, as well as portions of North 8th Street, also may be considered part of the North Slope, with a southern boundary on 6th Avenue.

The area has a diverse mix of large houses, apartments, and smaller bungalows. Tacoma's North Slope Historic District is a trapezoidal-shaped district bounded by North I Street to the north, Division Avenue to the east, and N Steele Street to the west. North Grant Avenue caps off the south end of the district. The North Slope has 1,285 resources and is one of the state's largest historic districts.

The District was settled primarily as a residential neighborhood and contains a wide variety of architectural styles including Stick Style, Queen Anne, Craftsman, American Foursquare, Tudor Revival, and Mission Revival. Within it you will find many churches, apartments, and a few business areas.

The neighborhood developed over time and it is common to find structures built 20, 30 or even 50 years later.

There were three building booms within the district: 1888 to 1893, 1902 to 1915, and 1919 to 1929. Nearly 80 percent of the homes were built prior to 1930.

== North Slope Historic District Park ==
Located at the corner of North K & North 8th Streets, the park has been a project of the North Slope Historic District, the City of Tacoma, and the North End Council. North Slope residents suggested the idea in the early 1990s, but the North Slope Historic District had no money to proceed. Our representatives on the North End Neighborhood Council eventually secured the funds from the Thea Foss Bond Issue given to each neighborhood council, but it took years to work out the transfer of the property from Tacoma Power to the City.

Metro Parks was the designing and developing agency, although the property is owned by the city. The small park contains a wooden piece of play equipment for small children, seating, handicapped ramp, and plantings. The design and equipment in the park were approved by the Landmarks Commission.

The park is maintained by Metro Parks Tacoma.

The park is dedicated to Valerie Sivinski, former Tacoma Historic Preservation Officer who provided guidance for the creation of the North Slope Historic District.
