= Proctor District, Tacoma, Washington =

Tacoma, Washington neighborhood

Coordinates: 47.2711°N 122.4889°W

The Proctor District is a business district and neighborhood in the north end of Tacoma, Washington.

The center of the Proctor District is located at the cross streets of Proctor Street and North 26th Street in Tacoma. Primarily a center for locals to shop, the District has cultivated a small town "urban village" character.

== History ==
Proctor is named for architect John G. Proctor.

Some of the land in Proctor was developed by Allen C. Mason, a business promoter who constructed buildings, roads, and infrastructure in Tacoma, including the bridge on Proctor Street over Puget Gulch. Proctor features a bronze statue of Mason. Mason donated Puget Gulch park to the city in 1888. The bridge over the gulch was constructed in 1927 and rebuilt in 2006. Mason also built the first Tacoma streetcar out of Downtown Tacoma, running through the Proctor District north to Point Defiance Park.

== Businesses ==
Situated in Tacoma's North End, the Proctor District is home to many small businesses. The Blue Mouse Theatre, built in 1923, is the oldest continuously operating movie theater in Washington. The Blue Mouse was open for 90 years in November 2013 and has been on the National Register of Historic Places since 2010.

A major commercial and residential development, Proctor Station, has been a controversial project due to its size and cost. It offers retail on the ground floor with apartments in the five floors above that. A proposed similar project at the other end of the Proctor District promises to be more controversial with many local residents formed in opposition and attempting to lower the height limitation from 65 feet to 45 feet, a move developers oppose as it will limit the profitability of the project. As of July 2022, the new building, Madison 25 has been constructed and provided 141 units to the neighborhood. A third building, Proctor III, was developed by the Gig Harbor-based Rush Companies.

== Schools and libraries ==
The Proctor District is the site of two public schools: Washington Elementary School and Mason Middle School.

Proctor contains the Wheelock branch of Tacoma Public Libraries, the busiest library in Tacoma.

== Farmers' market ==
Proctor hosts a farmers' market on Saturdays. The market started in 1994.
