= Commencement Bay =

Bay of Puget Sound, location of Tacoma, Washington

Coordinates: 47.2897°N 122.4580°W

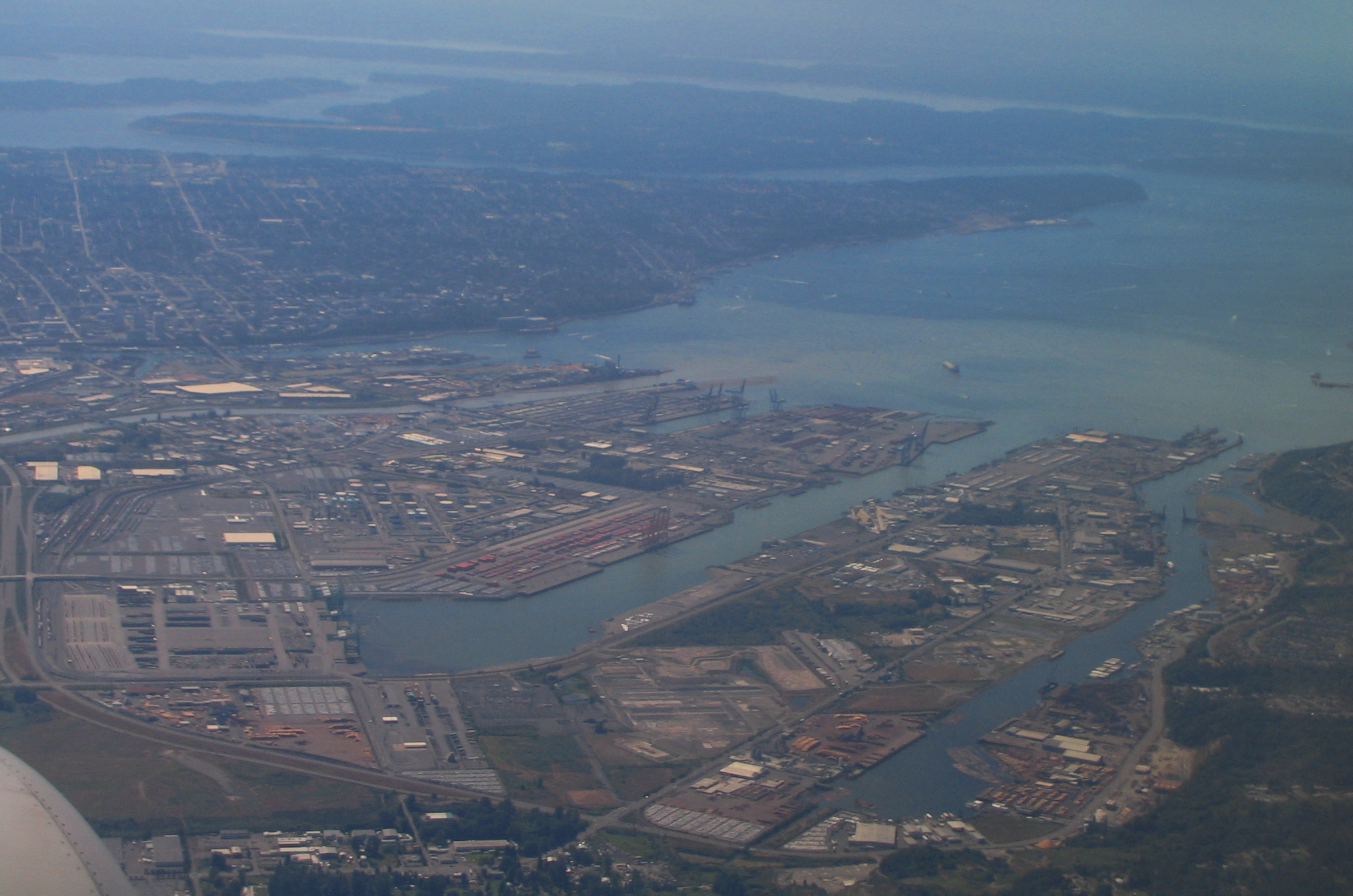
Commencement Bay, seen from the air facing west

Commencement Bay is a bay of Puget Sound in the U.S. state of Washington. The city of Tacoma is located on the bay, with the Port of Tacoma occupying the southeastern end. A line drawn from Point Defiance in the southwest to Browns Point in the northeast serves to mark the generally accepted division between the bay and the open sound. Commencement Bay has become home to one of the most active commercial ports in the world. The Port of Tacoma is the main port facility.

The Puyallup River is the largest freshwater stream emptying into the bay. Others include Ruston Creek, Mason Creek, Asarco Creek, Puget Creek, Hylebos Creek, and Wapato Creek.

== History ==
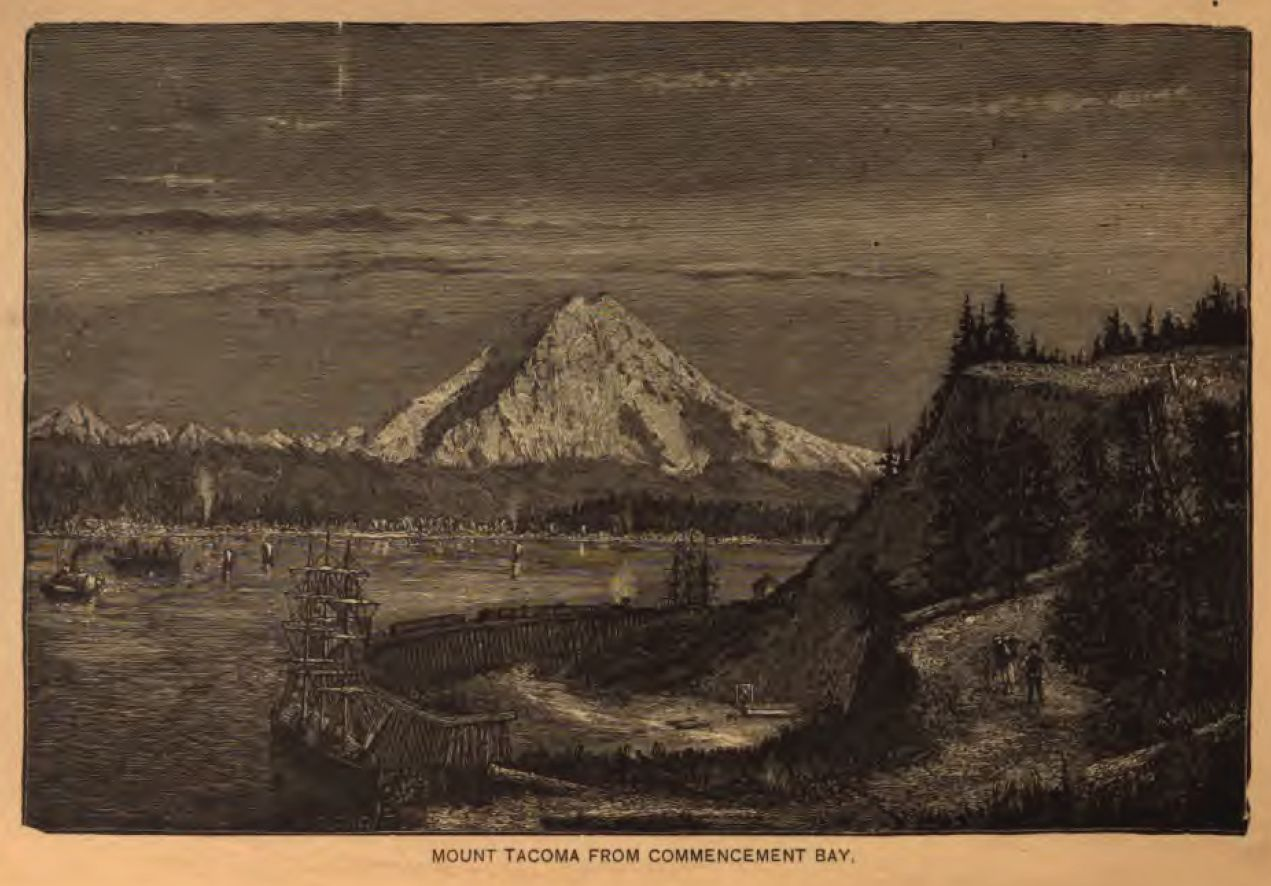
Artist rendering of Mt. Tacoma from Commencement Bay, 1888

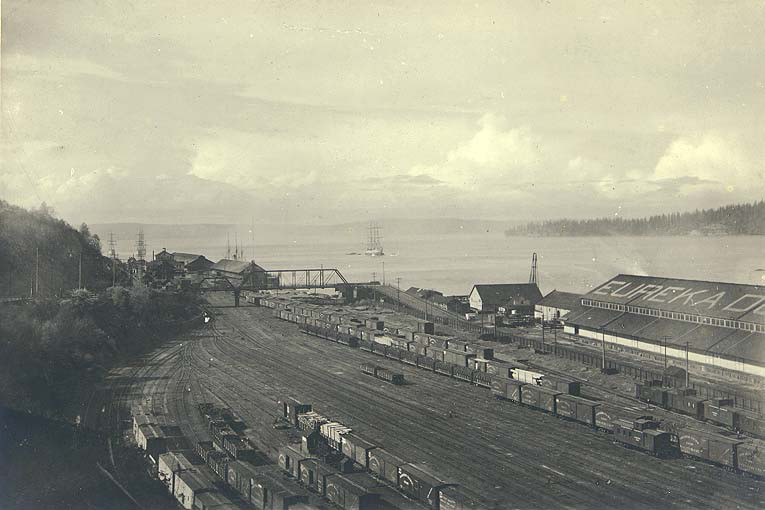
Commencement Bay from Tacoma, circa 1900

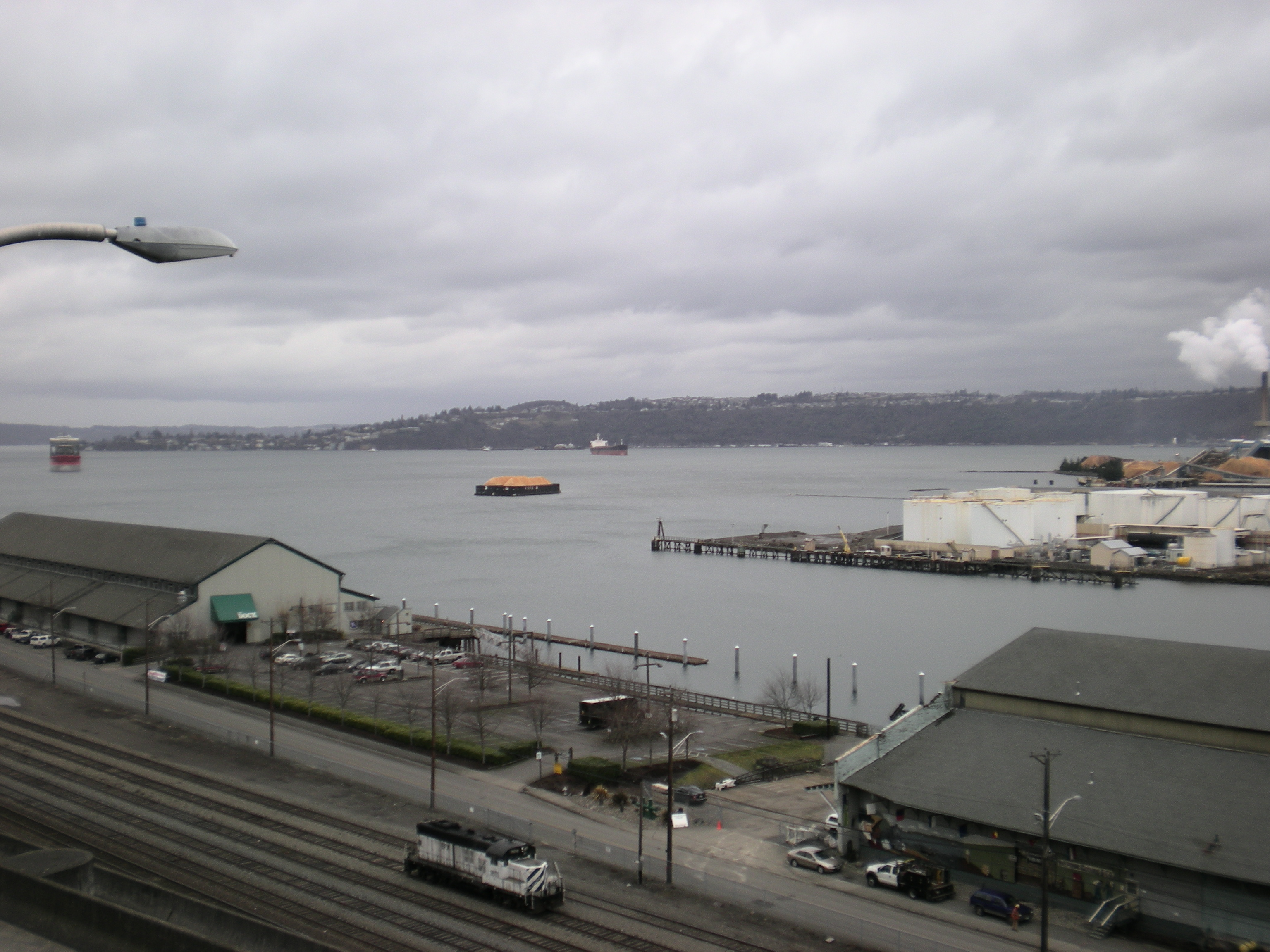
Commencement Bay from downtown Tacoma

Lieutenant Charles Wilkes of the United States Exploring Expedition named Commencement Bay in 1841, commemorating the place where he started his survey of southern Puget Sound.

The first Euro-American habitation on Commencement Bay was by Swede Nicolas Delin (b. ca. 1817). He built a water-powered sawmill in 1852 where a creek entered the head of the bay. A small community grew up around the operation, but the settlers evacuated during the Puget Sound War of 1855–56 and did not return.

In 1873 the Northern Pacific Railway, the first transcontinental railroad in the northern United States, announced it would locate its terminus at Commencement Bay. When the railroad reached the bay in 1883 it caused a boom of development in Tacoma. The railroad facilities were located near the extensive tide flats by the mouth of the Puyallup River, about a mile from the original site of Tacoma. Not only did the tide flats provide level ground compared to the steep slopes surrounding the rest of the bay, but dredging work would quickly provide deep water access to the railyards and warehouses. A new town, called New Tacoma, quickly grew up by the railroad hub. "Old town" Tacoma and New Tacoma soon merged. Large land grants were provided to the Northern Pacific, including a significant part of the coast of Commencement Bay. Over time the city of Tacoma bought up this land.

Originally the boundary between Pierce and King counties ran east from the mouth of the Puyallup River, splitting Commencement Bay between the two counties. In 1901 the border was changed, giving Pierce County the entire bay.

Seattle-Tacoma Shipbuilding operated out of the bay during World War 2 producing escort carriers and auxiliaries as one of the yards belonging to the Todd Corporation, which included a nearby yard on Harbor Island, Seattle.

== Environmental issues ==
For much of the 20th century a large smelting facility was operated by ASARCO on the shore of Commencement Bay near Point Defiance. The town of Ruston surrounds the former ASARCO plant. Tailing waste was dumped into the bay, eventually forming a long peninsula. Today it is a project area within the Commencement Bay Superfund site.

The Thea Foss Waterway, an arm of Commencement Bay near downtown Tacoma, was declared a Superfund site in 1983. In 1991, the Environmental Protection Agency announced that the St. Paul Waterway, once among the most contaminated parts of Commencement Bay, had been the first marine Superfund site in the nation to be cleansed of pollution.
