= Roland E. Borhek =

American architect (1883–1955)

- Born: 1883; Bethlehem, Pennsylvania
- Died: May 7, 1955 (aged 71–72); Gig Harbor, Washington
- Occupation: Architect
- Notable work: Rialto Theater, Crescent Ballroom

Roland Edward Borhek (1883 – May 7, 1955) was an architect in the state of Washington.

== Biography ==
Borhek was born in Bethlehem, Pennsylvania, in 1883. He attended Lehigh University before working as chief draftsman for the firm A. Warren Gould of Boston.

In 1905 Gould decided to move to Seattle for more work which prompted Borhek to follow. Together they designed the American Savings Bank building and the Empire building in Seattle which were the second and third concrete reinforced structures in the United States ever built.

Two years after moving to Seattle, Borhek decided to settle in Tacoma, Washington, and joined the architectural firm of Heath and Twitchell where he was credited for helping design the National Realty Building and the First Church of Christ Scientists.

By 1910 Borhek had made his own firm and secured jobs creating the Capitol Theater in Tacoma, and the Rialto Theater. His Auditorium Dance Hall, constructed in 1921 received high reviews from the Tacoma Daily Ledger. Borhek also designed the Jason Lee Middle School in 1924, for which he won an award from the American Institute of Architects. He became the president for the Tacoma Society of Architects in 1920, and served as vice-president and president of the Washington Chapter of the American Institute of Architects in 1930 and 1931.

== Personal life ==
Borhek married his wife, Marie, in 1913. He retired in 1942 and died on May 7, 1955, in Gig Harbor, Washington.

== Completed projects ==
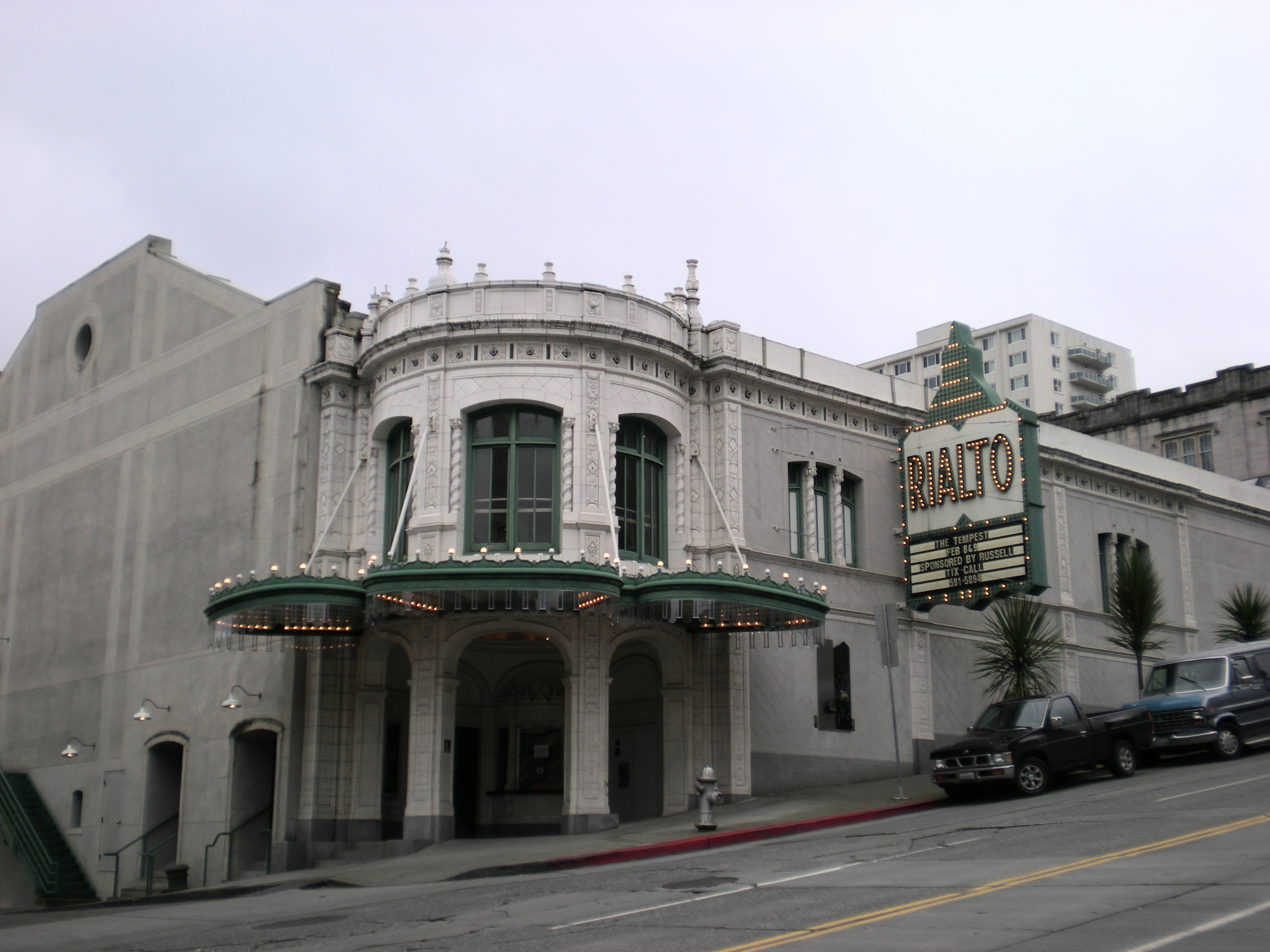
The Rialto Theater in Tacoma

- Puget Sound Bank Building - 1912
- Colonial Theater Tacoma - 1914
- Rialto Theater - 1918
- Tacoma Motors Company - 1919
- Winthrop Hotel - 1923
- Jason Lee Middle School - 1924
