= Urban Grace Church =

Coordinates: 47°15′18″N 122°26′32″W

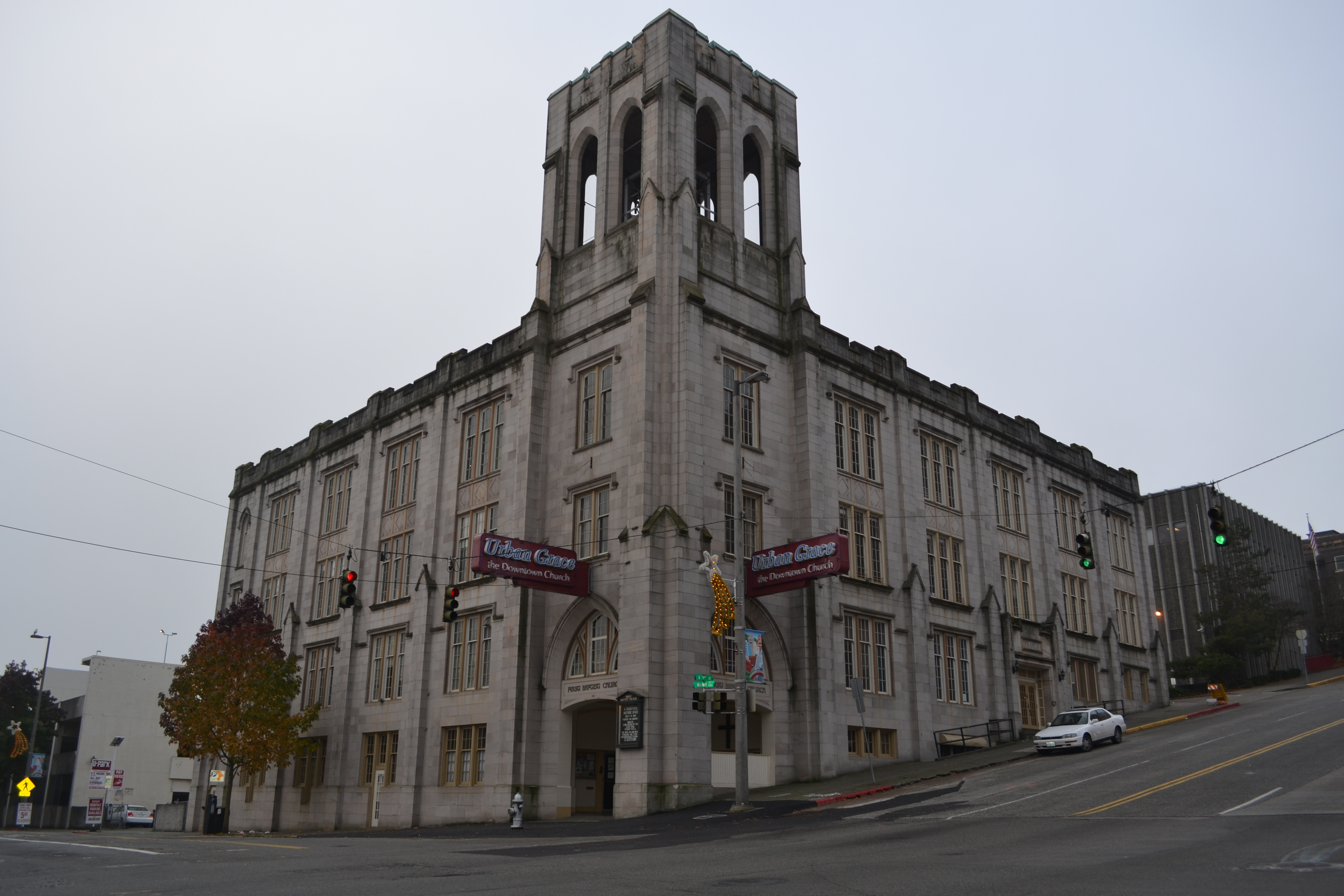
Urban Grace Church, 2011

Urban Grace Church, formerly First Baptist Church, was built in a Gothic Revival style in 1924 by Heath, Gove and Bell (see Frederick Heath) in Tacoma, Washington. The building's 53 rooms include an auditorium with 1,250 seats, a 500-seat banquet hall with stage, a kitchen, nursery room, small chapel, choir rooms, and the pastor's study. It is believed to be the oldest continuously used location for Christian religious services in the city. The congregation remains active. The church was originally Baptist, but is now interdenominational, combining Baptist, Presbyterian, Methodist, and Lutheran practices.

The Rialto mural by the Fab-5 graffiti artist group

Urban Grace Church and the City of Tacoma sponsor a poet laureate program and a poetry series in Tacoma. The "Soul of the City Poetry Series" event has featured Poet Laureate of Tacoma, William Kupinse. The church has also sponsored civil rights events. The church partnered with Trinity Presbyterian Church to hold a trade craft sale in 2008. The mural on the back of Tacoma's Rialto Theater was first proposed by the church in 2009, with design elements of "both street graffiti and Islamic mosaic pattern in a pleasingly aesthetic way that reflects the church's commitment to religious diversity." Although both the graffiti aspects and the Islamic motif were controversial, the mural was completed in 2010.
