= Auburn Masonic Temple (Auburn, Washington) =

Coordinates: 47°18′26″N 122°13′32″W

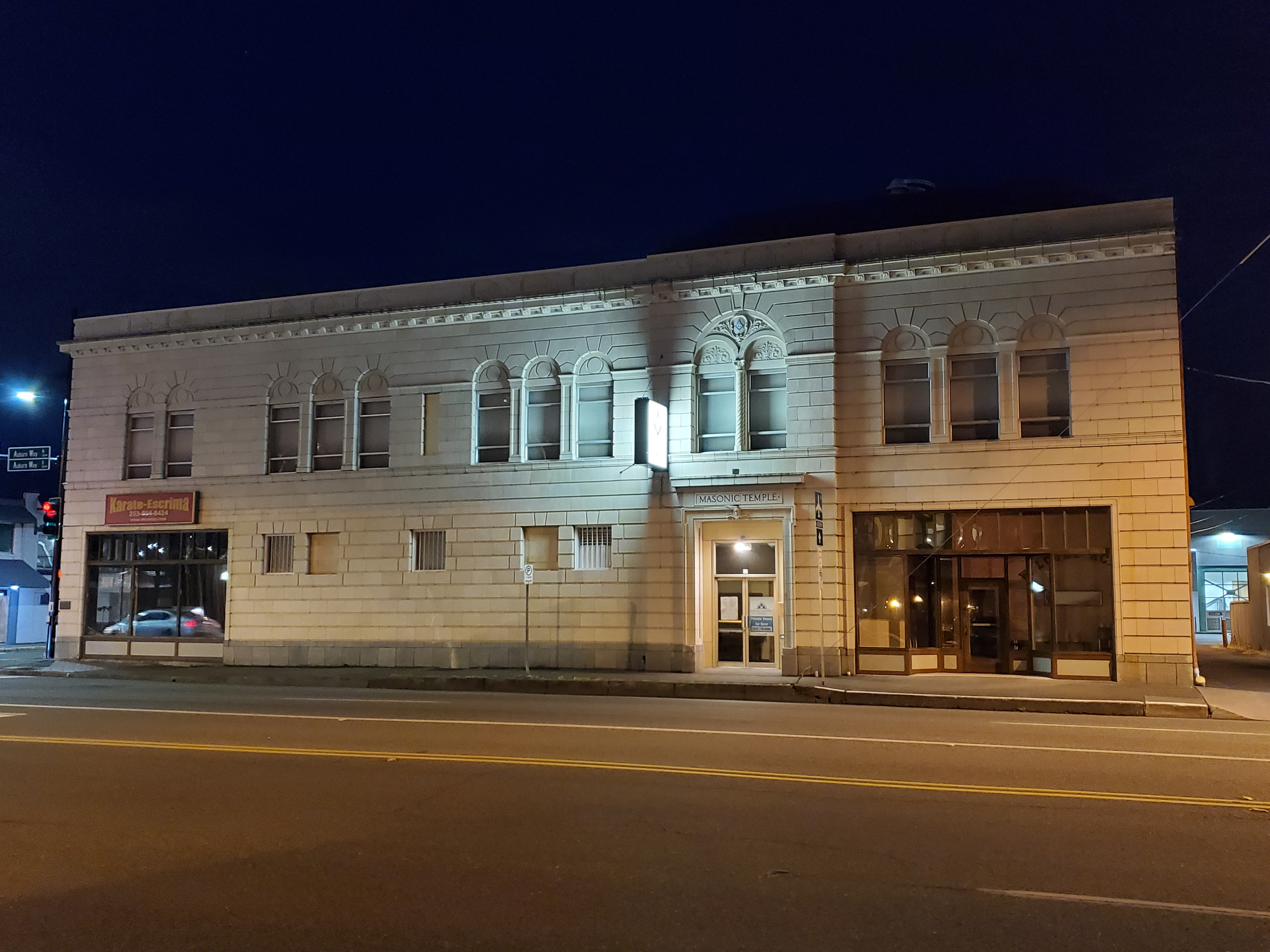
- Auburn Masonic Temple, June 2, 2020
- Interactive map of Auburn Masonic Temple
- Location: 10 Auburn Way South, Auburn, Washington
- Built: 1924
- Architect: Health, Gove and Bell
- Architectural style: Italian Renaissance
- Website: www.kingsolomon60.com

Significant dates
- Added to NRHP: July 2015
- Designated NRHP: National Register of Historic Places

The Auburn Masonic Temple is located at 10 Auburn Way South in Auburn, Washington. The building was listed on the National Register of Historic Places in 2015 and is significant for various reasons. The building is "an unusually sophisticated, urban version of fraternal architecture for a town of less than 3,500. It remains today the only fraternal hall in the city still in its original use."

== History ==
As early as 1886, settlers in the farming community of Auburn (originally named Slaughter) and the Green and White River valleys gathered to discuss the feasibility of forming a local Masonic lodge. These prospective members had been affiliated with the Masonic order in their previous hometowns and states. Because of this meeting and subsequent discussions, St. Andrews Lodge No. 35 in Renton was asked to sponsor a new lodge. The applicants prepared the necessary paperwork, petitioning the Grand Master for dispensation to establish the new lodge. In May 1889, shortly before Washington Territory became a state, the Grand Lodge issued that dispensation. The following year, on June 11, 1890, a charter was granted to King Solomon Lodge No.60. Henry A. Libby was named Master; William T. Myrick, Senior Warden; and George Hart, Junior Warden. The Freemasons were the second fraternal order to be established in Auburn, following the Knights of Pythias by only a few months.

Auburn Masons were proud of the fact that Lt. William Slaughter, who lost his life in hostilities with White River natives in 1855 and for whom the town was named, was the Past Master of Steilacoom Masonic Lodge #2. They were equally proud of the first governor of newly established Washington State, Elisha P. Ferry, was a Past Grand Master of Masons in Washington. The tradition of member prominence was continued in Auburn, where early leaders of the community such as C.H. French, Vice President of the Farmers and Merchants Bank of Slaughter, C.P. Lacey, liveryman and hotel owner, and Aaron Neely, valley pioneer, joined the ranks of King Solomon Lodge No. 60.

Like other Masonic organizations, Auburn's Masons were dedicated to mutual support, sociability, and involvement with the community. In its formative years, the Lodge experienced two difficult setbacks when, in 1897 and again in 1898, fire destroyed all of its records, regalia, and (in 1898) jewels on loan from the Grand Lodge. However, the group persisted. In 1901, the Cyclamen Chapter No. 65 Order of Eastern Star, a women's auxiliary was established. Other concordant bodies took shape - Damascus Shrine #3 of the Order of the White Shrine of Jerusalem was chartered in 1920, Auburn Chapter of #46, and the Royal Arch Masons was constituted in 1922.

The farming community of Auburn had enjoyed the gradual improvement of local rail service through the 1880s and 1890s. These circumstances changed considerably in 1900 when the Northern Pacific rerouted its main line over Stampede Pass directly into the city. The town suddenly became the transfer point for Seattle, Tacoma, and other points east. The rail yard was greatly expanded to accommodate the servicing of rolling stock, and the breaking and reforming of both local and transcontinental trains. The presence of the railroad strengthened local agriculture, especially dairying and market gardening, and stimulated local business and industry. Between 1900 and 1910, the population of Auburn doubled, and plats for nine additions were filed. Prosperity made progressive municipal improvements possible such as the construction of the first city hall, an expanded public water system, a new library, and a high school. Civic, religious and social organizations also flourished.

With continuing prosperity in the 1920s, established organizations like the Masons looked optimistically toward the future. Through the 1890s and 1910s, King Solomon Lodge No. 60 had met in five different rented halls situated around town. These included Neely Hall, Trinity Hall, Mystic Hall, and Cyclamen Hall. After much discussion, the Lodge made a decision to erect a new temple building to accommodate its own activities, and those of its concordant groups. To plan and carry out the project, a building committee was appointed in October 1921. For some years, the Lodge had owned a vacant site at the comer of Auburn Avenue and Second Street NE, but the committee felt strongly that the new building should front on Main Street, the thriving commercial thoroughfare. Brother Aaron Neely and his wife Sarah donated a new building site on East Main and C Street SE (now Auburn Way S.), free and clear of debt and ready for development.

Excavation of the site in preparation for construction had begun by mid-September 1923. Brother Thomas W. Kelly served as the Lodge's supervisor of construction. A festive cornerstone ceremony was held on January 10, 1924. This event received coverage in the local press, which noted good attendance, with participation by Grand Master Tom Holman of Olympia and music by the Auburn Quartet. The Auburn Globe -Republican of June 27, 1924, contained the first meeting notice for the new location, "F & AM meeting in New Masonic Temple."

After occupying the new building in the summer of 1924, King Solomon Lodge No. 60 continued to expand its role in the community. Several youth organizations were formed in the 1920s, including DeMolay, Rainbow Girls, and Job's Daughters. Lodge membership rose impressively from 192 in 1924, to a peak of 451 in 1961. Over the years, the Lodge sponsored innumerable social events such as the annual Children's Christmas Party. The temple dance hall was made available to other organizations for rent. The Lodge also contributed regularly to community improvements ranging from development of parks to social services. Current activities include a high school scholarship program supported by the annual King Solomon Charity Golf Classic, and three outreach programs that supply reading books to the local public schools. Today, King Solomon Lodge No. 60 remains a viable organization, and the Masonic Temple is the only fraternal building, out of six major lodges that once operated in Auburn, to remain in its original use.

As of 2015 the Auburn Masonic Temple remains in the hands of the Freemasons. It was listed on the National Register of Historic Places in July 2015.

== Architecture ==
Heath, Gove & Bell designed the Temple in the Italian Renaissance Revival Style. The style was inspired by 14th and 15th century wealthy Florentine merchant buildings in Italy. Urban palazzo such as those constructed for the Medici family, were used as direct inspiration of the rebirth of the style during the 20th century. The word "Renaissance" means "rebirth", and designers of the original Renaissance style had studied Greek and Roman building forms and details in order to employ a feeling that a building could display wealth, artist knowledge, and pride. It was during this time, that many designers rediscovered a theory of perfection in architectural design called the Golden Section.

Five hundred years later the style reemerged as architects began to look for new architectural inspiration during the early part of the 19th century. In the Pacific Northwest, the Italian Renaissance Revival Style was late to take hold, and can be found mainly during the mid to late 1920s. It was utilized primarily for commercial and civic buildings such as libraries, social lodges, courthouses or banks. However examples can be found on large-scale single family residences and apartment complexes.

Usually rectangular in plan, the style features symmetrical facades, with masonry or stone exterior walls highlighted by cast stone or terra cotta detailing. Often, the formal design is distinguished by a rusticated ground level and quoining at the corners of the main facade.

Other distinguishing elements include a strong division of floors by elaborate string courses, which often define the sills of windows; rows of round topped windows made up of two lights under one arch separated by a colonette; and a deep articulated cornice. Windows of a different type are often found on each floor and are commonly highlighted by strongly marked voussoirs, pilasters, spandrel panels or pediments.

Most Italian Renaissance Revival Style buildings have low pitched or flat roofs which are hidden by cornices, short parapet walls or balustrades. Small scale examples such as depots and dwellings, utilize hip roofs with wide overhanging eaves covered in clay tile, which harkens to the Mediterranean roots of the style. The Auburn Temple is a good example of the style.

The Temple has undergone a few changes over the years such as new upper-story, shop windows and doors being installed sometime around the 1960s, a metal awning was adding over the East side shop, which is currently the comic book store. Drop ceilings or asbestos tile were placed over the original ceilings with only the East side shop interior being spared. An elevator to the second story was installed as well around this time.

Architectural drawings for some subsequent remodeling projects also survive in the Lodge vault. A 1952-53 set of drawings by architect Percy G. Ball of Tacoma records the modification for a morgue at the south end ground floor and basement levels. Although no drawings depicting it survive, exterior modifications to the storefronts and windows, dating from this same decade, were likely inspired (and perhaps financed by) the National Bank of Commerce, the new ground floor tenant. Another set of drawings by architects Don Allison & Associates of Auburn document a 1960 interior remodel of the kitchen and other Lodge spaces on the second floor.

== See also ==
- National Register of Historic Places listings in King County, Washington
