= U.S. Bank Building (Spokane) =

High-rise building in Spokane, Washington

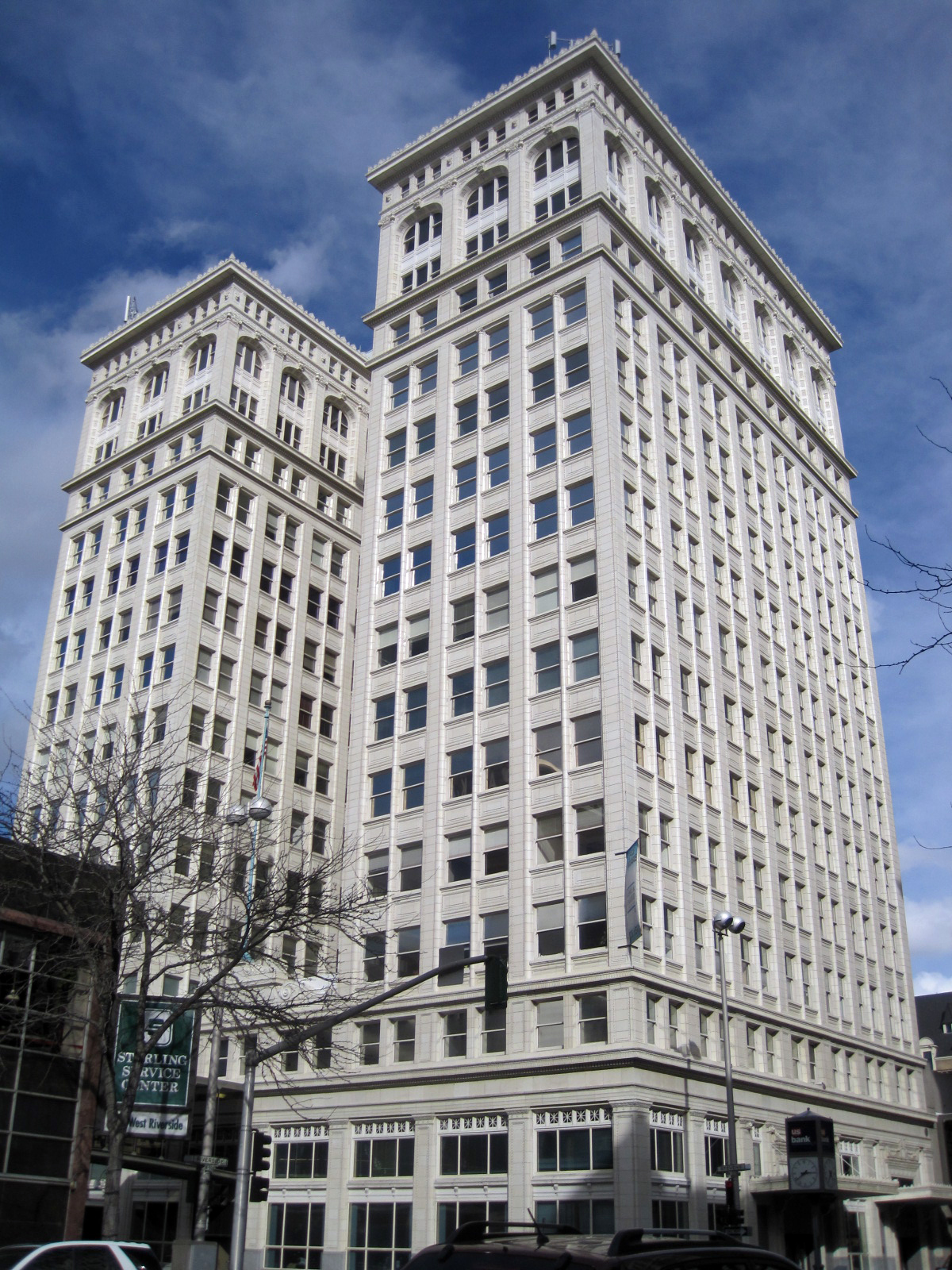
- Interactive map of the U.S. Bank Building area

Record height
- Tallest in Washington state from 1910 to 1911^{[I]}
- Preceded by: Alaska Building (Seattle)
- Surpassed by: Key Bank Center (Tacoma)

General information
- Status: Completed
- Architectural style: Chicago School
- Location: 422–428 West Riverside Avenue; Spokane, Washington
- Coordinates: 47°39′30″N 117°25′09″W
- Completed: 1910

Height
- Roof: 219 ft (67 m)

Technical details
- Floor count: 16

Design and construction
- Architect: Daniel Burnham

The U.S. Bank Building, previously the Old National Bank Building, is a high-rise in Spokane, Washington, United States. Having been completed in 1910, it was the first skyscraper in the Inland Northwest. At 219 ft (67 m) tall, the building was the tallest in the state of Washington from 1910 to 1911, when it was surpassed by the Key Bank Center in Tacoma—which itself was far surpassed by Seattle's Smith Tower in 1914. It remained the tallest building in Spokane, until the 1929 completion of the Paulsen Medical and Dental Building, located across the street.

== History ==
In 1891, the Old National Bank of Spokane was founded. The bank quickly grew to be a large institution within the Inland Northwest and in 1910, decided to build a headquarters worthy of the Northwest. There was a national design competition to decide the buildings appearance. The winning design was awarded to D.H. Burnham & Company of Chicago, a notable firm for building some of Americas most famous buildings of the 20th century. The tower was built in the Chicago School style and had Beaux-Arts architecture features throughout the facade. This was the last office building to be designed by Burnham, with its completion being quickly followed by his death in 1912. The building broke ground in March 1910 and was completed a mere eight months later, opening its doors to the public in January 1911.

The Old National Bank building was notable for having 90 per cent of the building rented out to tenants at the time of its completion, and for being built having been financed by large bankers of the area, causing it to be built without a mortgage or deficit at a cost of $1,300,000. These happenings made the building, and the bank, worthy of the city of Spokane and the patrons who financed its construction, who gained valuable profit and recognition.

=== Architecture ===
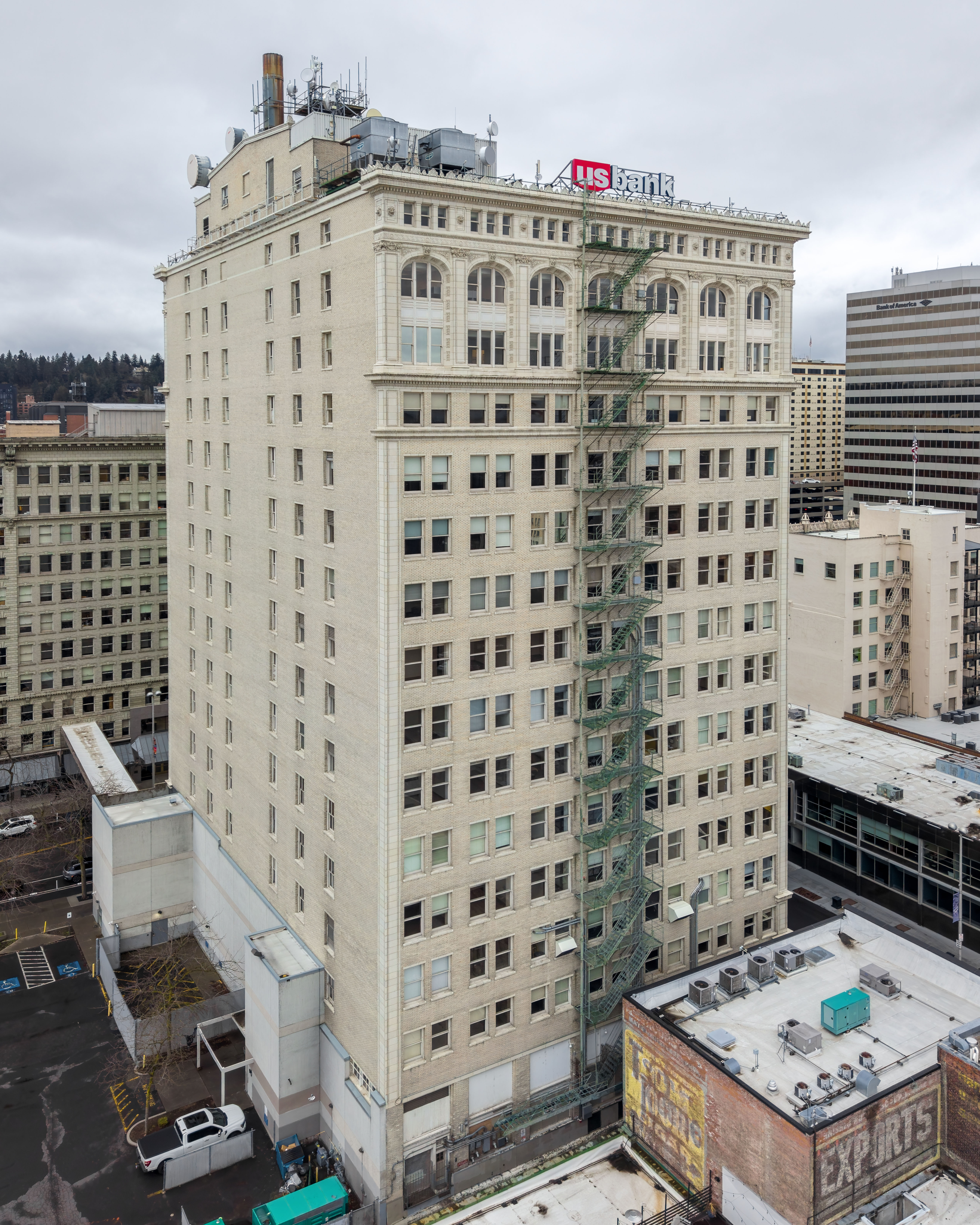
Rear view of tower

The bank was built using fireproofed steel frame construction, with the exterior faced with semi-enamel Terra Cotta. To enhance the contrast between the white Terra Cotta and the fenestration, the wood window frames were painted a forest green. The first level is topped with a four-foot cornice of Vermont granite, eleven stories higher from the twelfth floor to the fifteenth floor, an arcade was implemented crowning the entire structure. A walk on the roof offered views of the growing city.

The interiors were just as elaborate as the exteriors, at least at the time of their creation. There were two entrances off of Riverside Ave; the banking entrance and the office tower entrance. The banking entrance opens up to a grand lobby two levels in height. Granite ionic columns hold up the clerestory space being connected by service stations and tellers all facing the open lobby for ease of access by the people. The office tower entrance opens up immediately to the elevator lobby, servicing the other floors of the bank and the tenants in the rented spaces above. These five elevators were provided by the Otis Elevator Company, and ran smoothly up the entirety of the building with the help of live elevator operators. Two of these elevators service the first through ninth floors, two more service the eighth through the fourteenth floors, and the fifth elevator services the entire building. These elevator operations were planned to accommodate the best circulation of tenants throughout the building.

=== Banking Features ===
Some of the most notable features within the bank was not in its architecture or design, but in its operations. The facilities were state of the art and served Spokane with the highest quality equipment at the time, providing banking in the northwest with the maximum convenience it could. Another feature that caused the Old National Bank to stand out against the rest of the Inland Empire was featured in its basement, often out of public view. Directly within the banking entrance, the main stairs led down to the vault floor. The vault door was twenty-three inches thick and weighed thirty-six tons. This door guarded the largest private vault in the Northwest, a 27 by 9 foot room, with walls covered in three layers of laminated steel, Bessemer steel, and chrome steel, each layer being one and a half inches thick. Besides this main vault, there was a vault located on every floor of the building, each one being fire and burglar proof, proving to the community that whatever was kept in the building would be safe.

== Renovations ==
The Old National Bank building has undergone two major renovations since its construction in 1910. The first renovation took place in the early 1920s. It consisted of turning the clerestory space into a mezzanine, allowing for the second floor to look down onto the lobby. The second renovation in the late 1963 dramatically altered the appearance of the interiors. The ceiling of the lobby was lowered, allowing for the first two floors of the bank to be pancaked on top of each other; the granite ionic columns were also stripped. After the 1963 renovation, the building took part in a lighting contest winning a national award, the entire facade of the building was lit up with fluorescent lights, glowing in the Spokane skyline. Today the Old National Bank building is occupied by US Bank.
