= Trommald Building =

Historic building in Enumclaw, Washington

- U.S. National Register of Historic Places
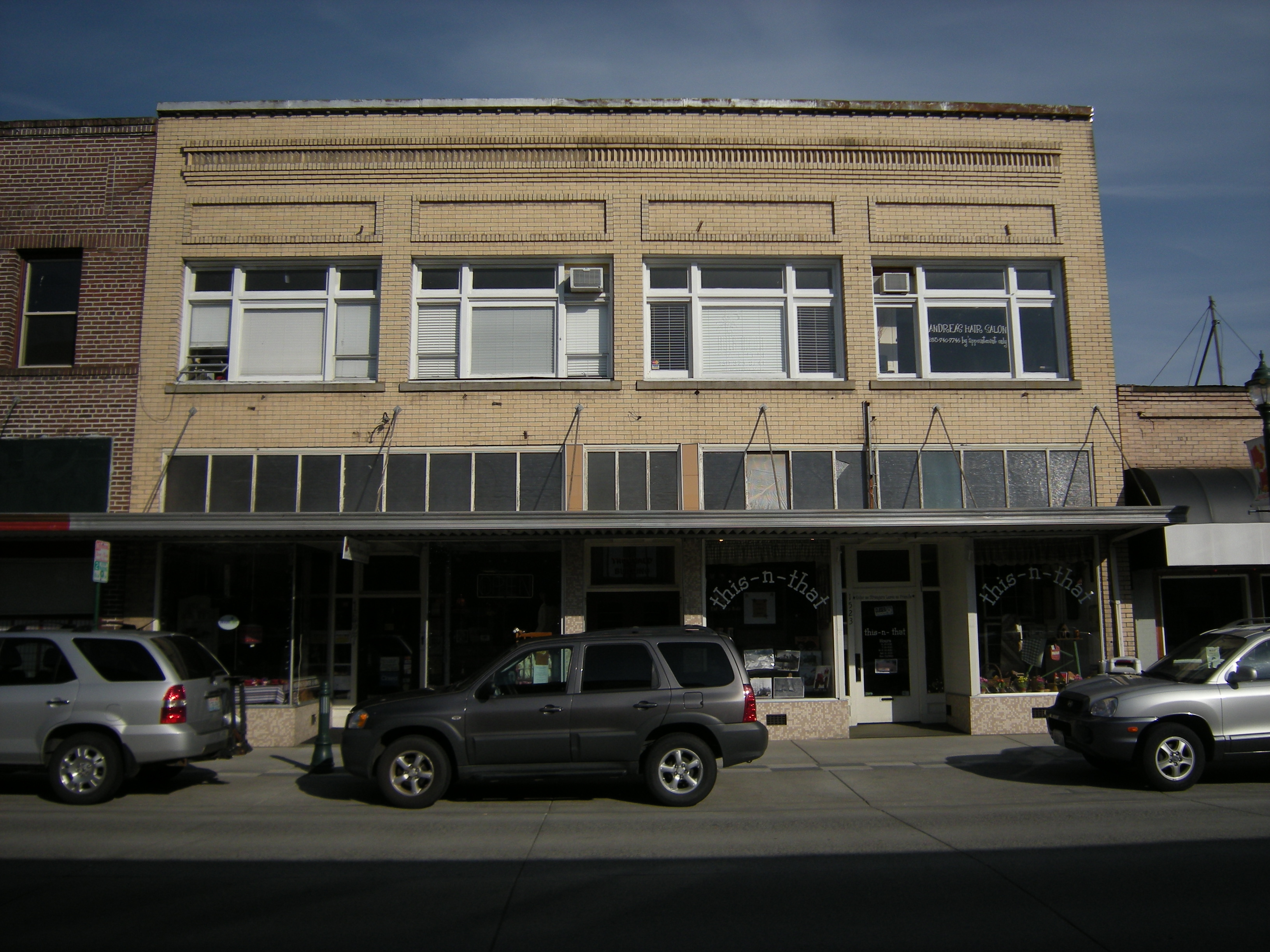

- Location within Washington (state)
- Location: 1523-1525 Cole St., Enumclaw, Washington, U.S.
- Coordinates: 47°12′12″N 121°59′24″W
- Built: 1915
- Architect: Heath & Gove
- NRHP reference No.: 00000972
- Added to NRHP: August 24, 2000

The Trommald Building is a historic building in Enumclaw, Washington, United States, that was listed on the National Register of Historic Places on August 24, 2000 (ID #00000972). It was built in 1915 by Tacoma dry goods merchant Erick G. Trommald for $30,000 adjoining Enumclaw's first modern office building, the Jensen Building. Trommald commissioned notable Tacoma architects Heath & Gove to plan the structure.

The building is significant for its relatively intact architecture, influenced by the Chicago School style. The Trommald building was part of a City Beautiful movement in the 1910s and 1920s to replace dilapidated wooden buildings with fireproof brick buildings.
