= Sitka Pioneer Home =

- Sitka Pioneers' Home
- U.S. National Register of Historic Places
- Alaska Heritage Resources Survey
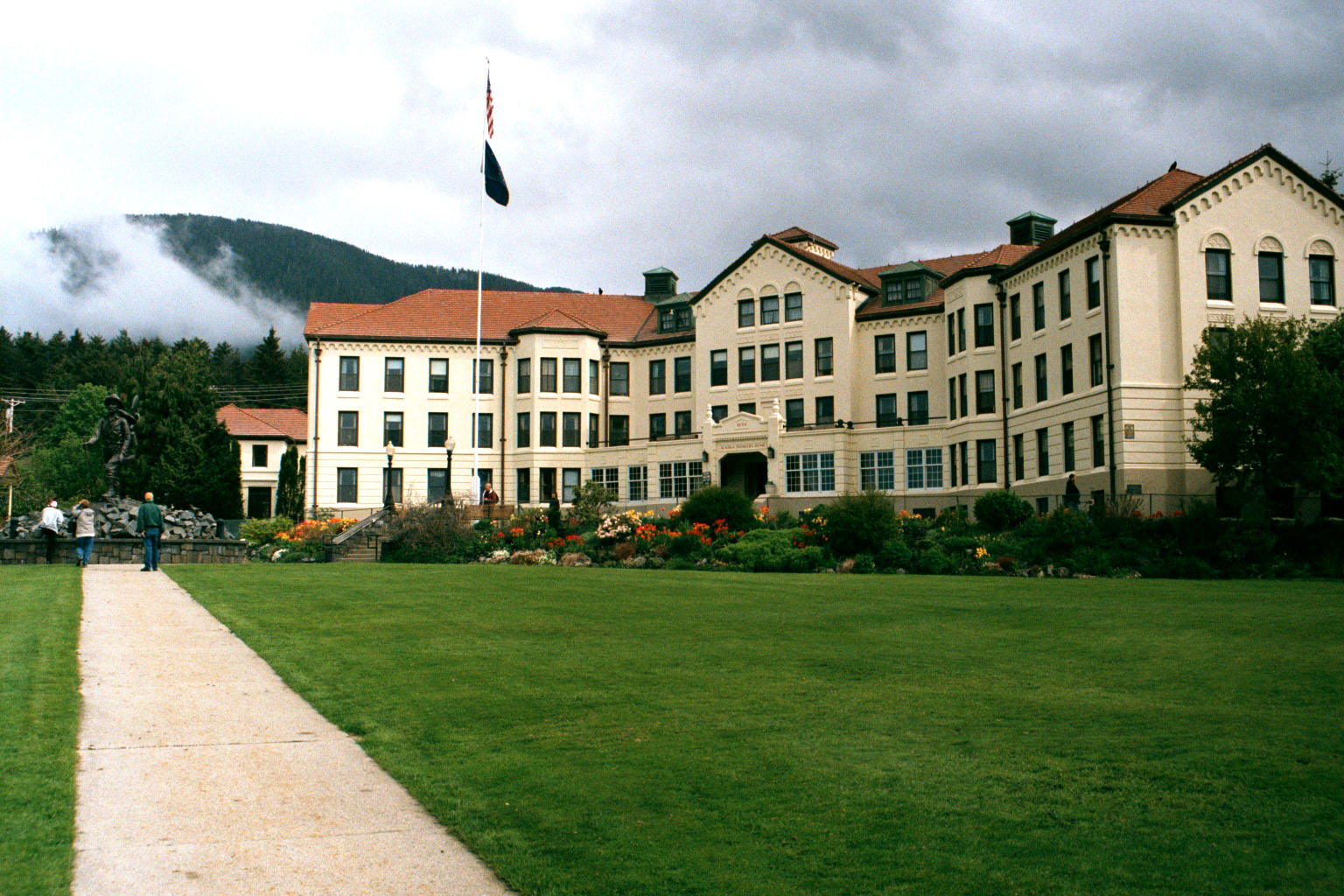
- The Sitka Pioneer Home

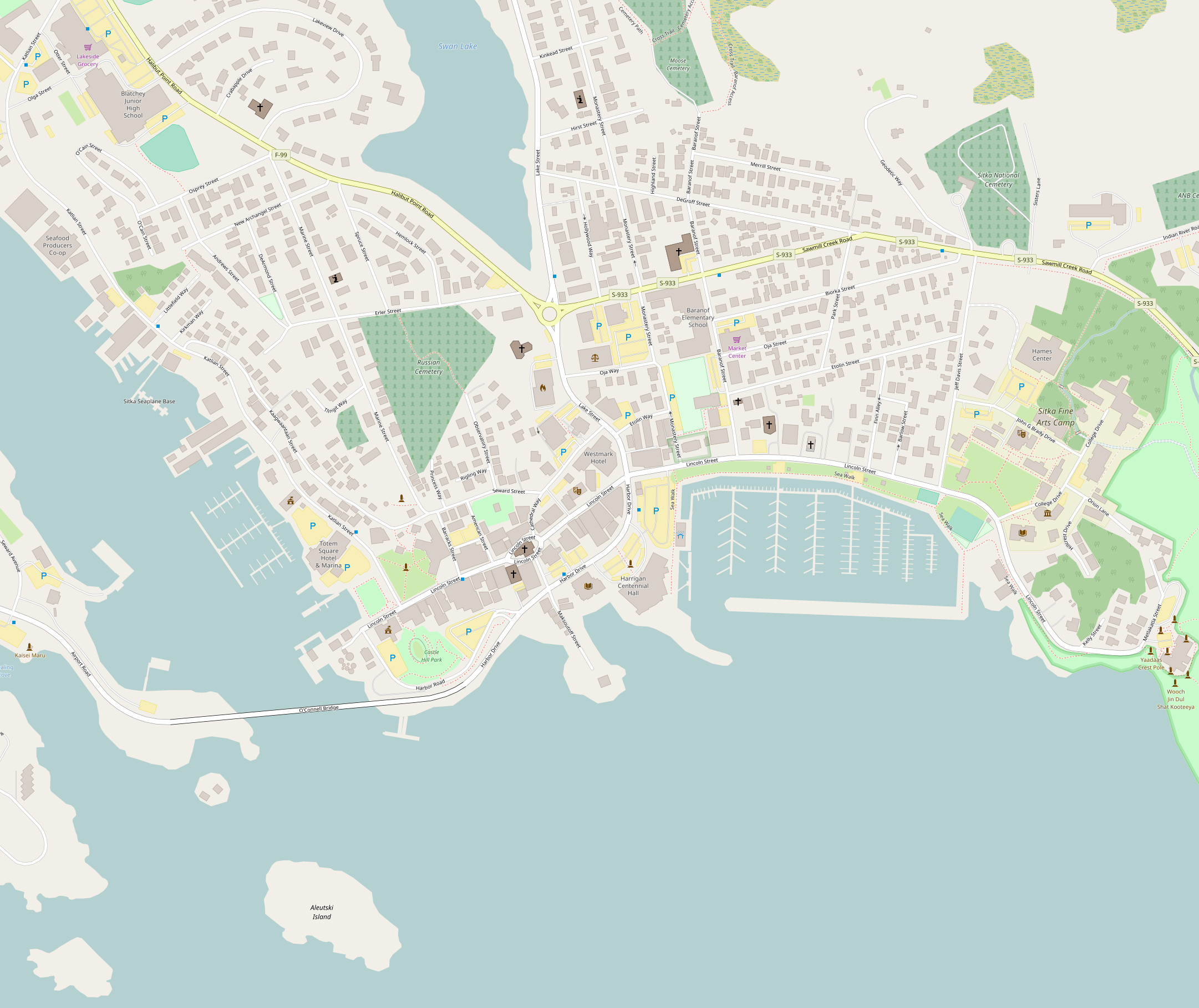
- Location within Downtown Sitka Location within Alaska
- Location: 120 Katlian Street, Sitka, Alaska
- Coordinates: 57°03′00″N 135°20′15″W
- Area: 3 acres (1.2 ha)
- Built: 1913
- Architect: Heath, Gove & Bell; Linn Argyle Forrest; Alonzo Victor Lewis
- NRHP reference No.: 79000413
- AHRS No.: SIT-097

Significant dates
- Added to NRHP: October 18, 1979
- Designated AHRS: January 4, 1977

The Sitka Pioneer Home is an assisted living home, located at 120 Katlian Street in downtown Sitka, Alaska. It is operated by the Division of Pioneer Homes within the Alaska Department of Health and Social Services and it is the oldest and fourth largest of the six homes in the State. The building was designed by the Tacoma firm of Heath, Gove & Bell.

Currently, the Home can care for 65 residents including those suffering from Alzheimer's disease, or other forms of dementia. The home provides three Levels of Care: Level 1 or "Independent", Level 2 or "Basic Assistance", and Level 3 or "24-Hour Care".

The property, including the Totem Square located across Katlian Street, was placed on the listed on the National Register of Historic Places in 1979.

== History ==
A contingent of U.S. Marine Corps had been stationed from 1879 to 1892 in a group of barracks built by Russia in the 1800s, located at the actual site of Sitka Pioneer Home. When the troops were withdrawn and the base closed in 1912, the site, which had expanded with the addition of several buildings, remained unused. When the Territory of Alaska was established in August 1912, Sitka representatives asked to the Navy Department the permission to create the Sitka Pioneer Home in the area.

The Sitka Pioneer Home was opened in September 1913 on a $10,000 budget. The home struggled financially until the 1930s, when the federal and territorial governments appropriated around $400,000 to replace the dilapidated and fire-prone buildings, creating a new home capable of caring for 170 men. The Public Works Administration provided financial assistance for the facility. In 1949, upon mandate from the territorial legislature, an expansion was constructed, with women permitted to be taken under care.

The Pioneer Home has also played a large part in Sitka's Alaska Day festivities. The parade through downtown ends close to the grounds and hundreds of people mingle at a free reception inside the home with live entertainment traditionally provided by the New Archangel Dancers. The annual Alaska Day croquet tournament takes place on the grounds at the same time.

== Prospector statue ==
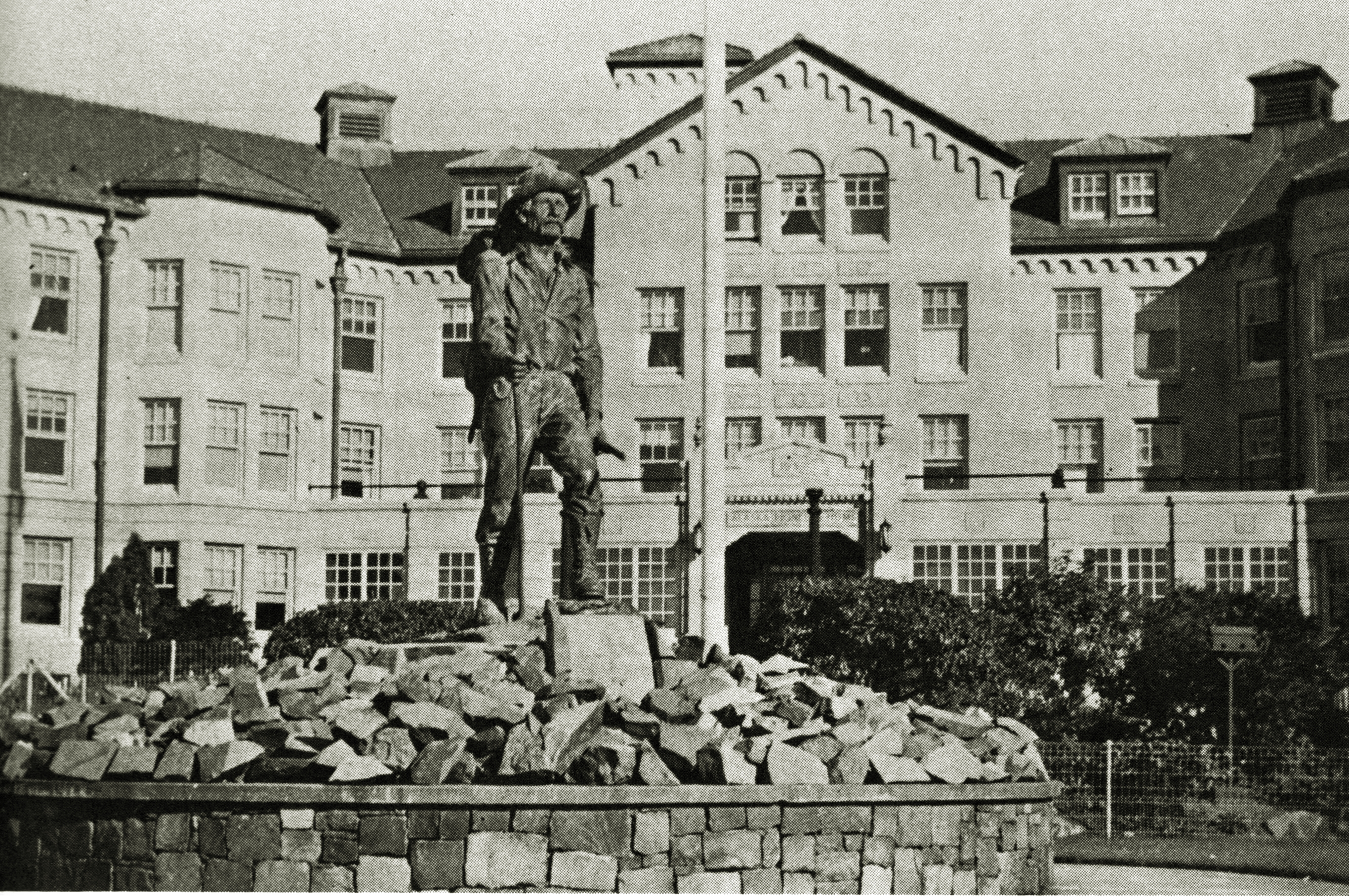
Closeup view of the building's front as it appeared during the 1970s.

A statue entitled The Prospector, sculpted by Alonzo Victor Lewis, serves as the centerpiece of the grounds of the Sitka Pioneer Home. The sculpture was supposed to be modeled after real-life pioneer William Clark "Skagway Bill" Fonda, a resident of Skagway and originally of Fonda, New York. This statue is the larger of two models that Lewis created. The smaller of the pair sits in Seattle's Klondike Gold Rush National Historic Park in Pioneer Square. After more than three tons of clay and 21 years of fundraising, the sculpture was finally shipped to Sitka in time for its dedication at 1949's Alaska Day.
