= Alaska Building =

Building in Seattle, Washington, United States

The Alaska Building
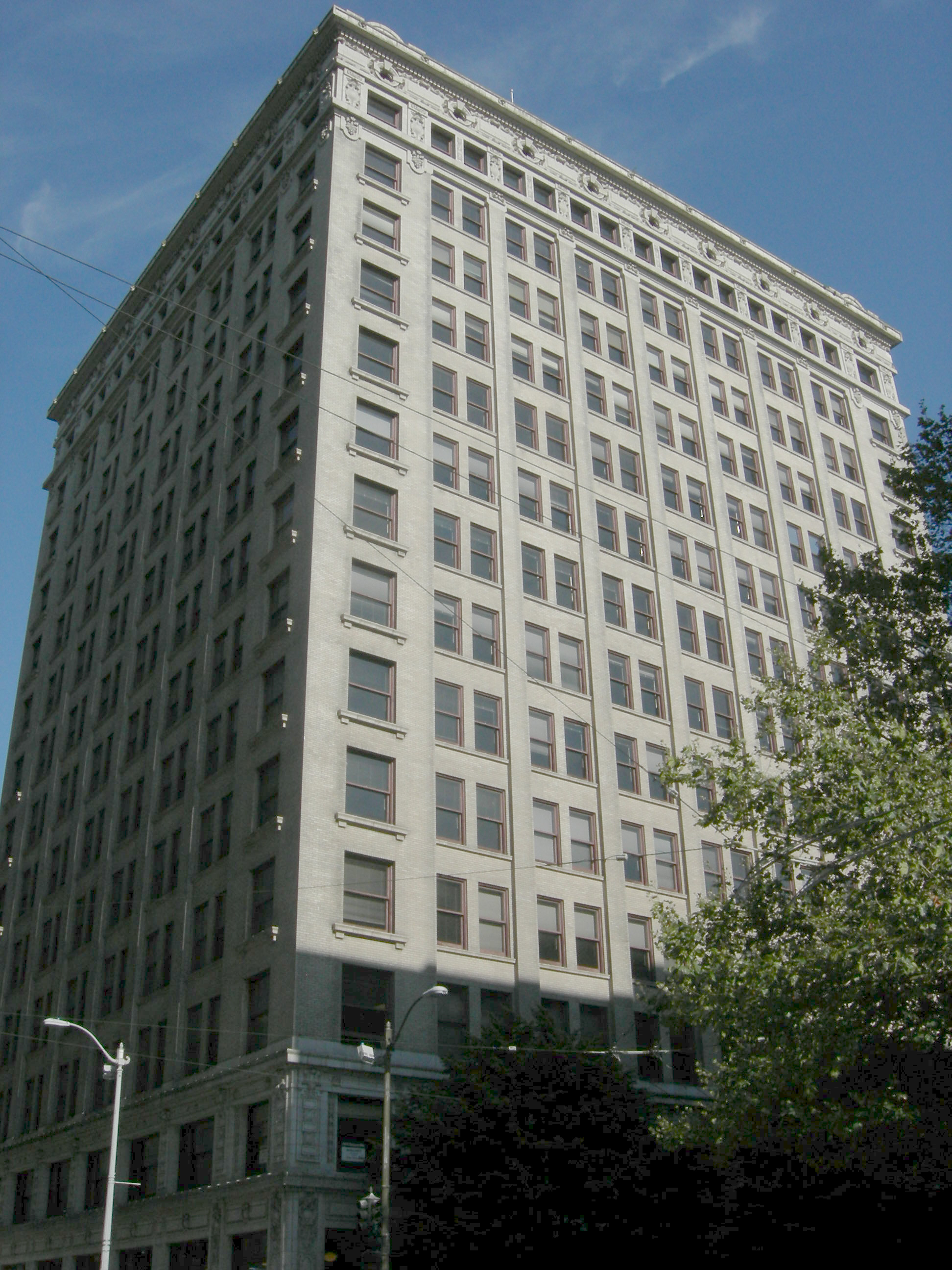

- Location within Downtown Seattle
- Hotel chain: Courtyard by Marriott

Record height
- Tallest in Washington state from 1904 to 1910^{[I]}
- Preceded by: Pioneer Building (Seattle)
- Surpassed by: U.S. Bank Building (Spokane)

General information
- Location: United States, 618 2nd Avenue; Seattle, Washington 98104
- Coordinates: 47.603°N 122.3327°W
- Opening: 1904
- Owner: American Life, Inc.
- Operator: Marriott International

Height
- Height: 62 m (203 ft)

Technical details
- Floor count: 15

Design and construction
- Architects: Eames and Young with Saunders and Lawton

Other information
- Number of rooms: 262
- Number of restaurants: 1 (The Bistro)

Website
- www.courtyardpioneersquare.com

The Alaska Building, which now houses the Courtyard Seattle Downtown/Pioneer Square hotel, is a 15-floor building in Seattle, Washington completed in 1904 to designs by St. Louis architects Eames and Young. At the time of its completion, it was the tallest building in the state of Washington—and remained so until the 1910 completion of Spokane's Old National Bank Building.

The building was purchased by American Life, Inc. on December 6, 2007, for $38.7 million and renovated to begin a new life as a Courtyard by Marriott in June 2010. The original exterior of the structure was maintained, as were the marble lobby, original crown molding, window framing and wood pillars.

== History ==
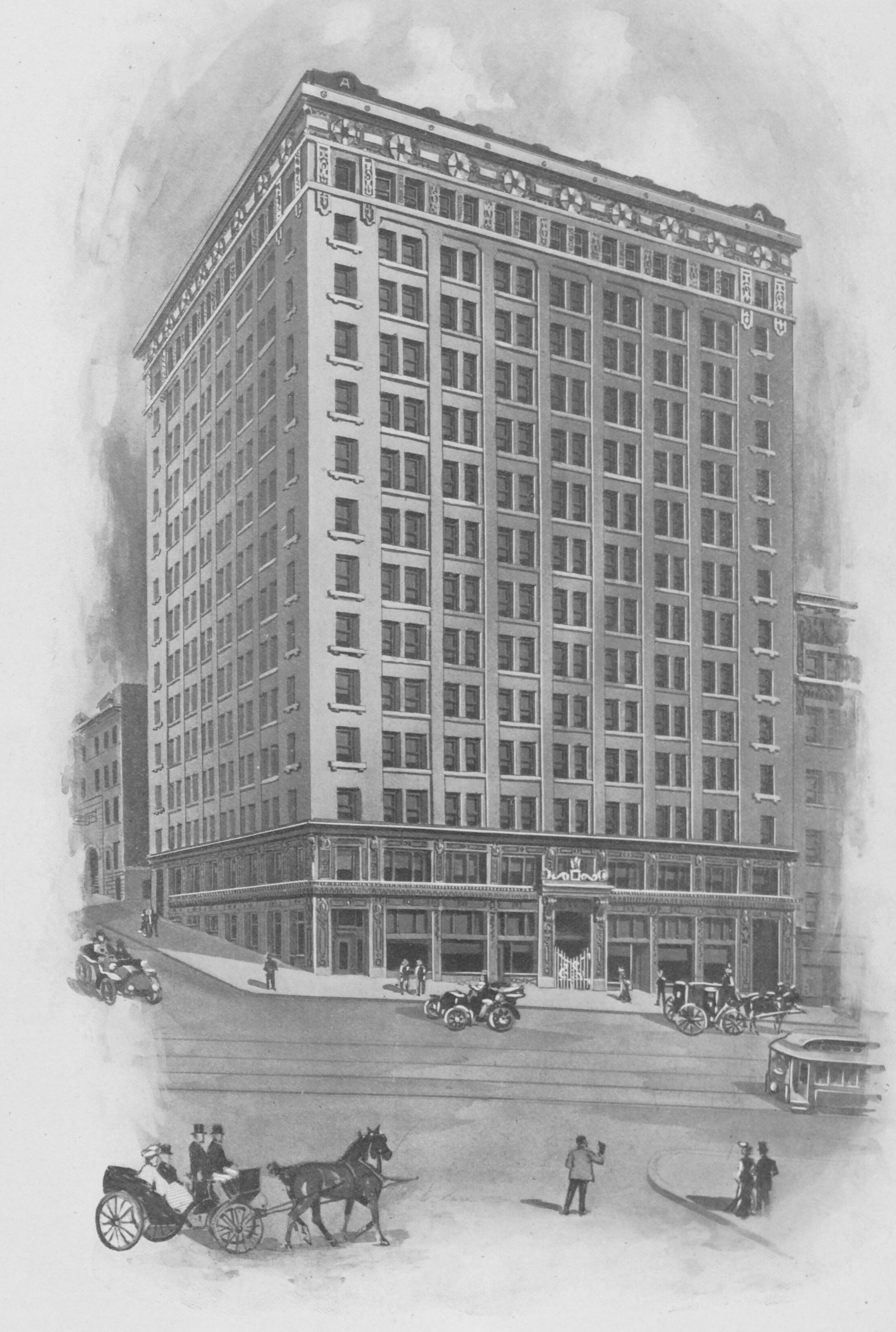
The Alaska Building, pictured in 1904

The fourteen-story Alaska Building was completed in 1904, following eleven months of construction. It was designed by Eames and Young, a St. Louis architectural firm, under the supervision of local architects Saunders and Lawton. The contractor was James Black Masonry Construction.

The building was the first steel frame building of any height in the Northwest and Seattle's first skyscraper. It remained Seattle's tallest building for ten years after it was built. It was designed using terra cotta and in a style inspired by the Beaux Arts, which is somewhat rare for Seattle (although the Frye Hotel is another major Beaux Arts example in the Pioneer Square-Skid Road National Historic District). The building dates from a period of economic and industrial growth, 1900–1910, in the heart of Seattle and in the city as a whole.

In 1897, when Alaskan prospectors came ashore at a Seattle wharf with a "ton of gold", the city marketed itself as the "Gateway to the Klondike." The successful promotional campaign sparked a period of explosive economic and population growth that spurred development of the city's infrastructure, transforming it from a town into a metropolis. In 1903, Seattle's Scandinavian-American Bank, directed by Jafet Lindeberg, John Edward Chilberg and others, purchased the southeast corner of Second Avenue and Cherry Street from the Amos Brown estate with the intention of erecting a new bank building. Shortly after the land purchase, J.C. Marmaduke of St. Louis proposed a partnership to construct the more ambitious Alaska Building. Caught up in the boomtown spirit of the Gold Rush years, the bank's shareholders readily endorsed the project, which was intended to promote business ventures between Alaska and the Pacific Northwest and as a social club. About four years later, a similar club, the Arctic Club, formed as a result of the merger of the Arctic Brotherhood and of the Alaska Club, would erect a building for itself at Third Avenue and Jefferson Street, now the Morrison Hotel.

As the first steel-frame structure of any height in the Northwest, the Alaska Building was Seattle's first "skyscraper" and its tallest building – a distinction that it held until 1911. In addition to its height, it is notable for its Beaux Arts ornamentation, which is a rarity in Seattle. When the building opened, the Alaska Club, a prominent commercial organization of residents and entrepreneurs, convened in the penthouse, and maintained a reading room that featured Alaska newspapers and mineral exhibits; the Scandinavian-American banking hall occupied the main floor. The Alaska Building heralded the development of other imposing structures on what soon became the city's major commercial strip, popularly known as the Second Avenue canyon.

In their book Hard Drive to the Klondike, Lisa Mighetto and Marcia Babcock Montgomery state: "This fourteen-story structure symbolized the significance of the gold rush in Seattle. The porthole windows along the top floor looked out over the waterfront, providing a view of the shipbuilding, shipping and rail industries that the gold rush encouraged. For many years a gold nugget embedded in the building's front door reminded visitors of the stampede and the city's connection to the Far North."

The Alaska Building remains a dominant structure on the northern cusp of the Pioneer Square Historic District, which was created by a City of Seattle ordinance in 1970, and which was listed on the National Register of Historic Places the same year as the Pioneer Square Skid Road National Historic District. The Alaska Building was rehabilitated by the architects Stickney/Murphy in 1982.
