= First Church of Christ, Scientist (Tacoma, Washington) =

Coordinates: 47°15′42″N 122°27′05″W

First Church of Christ, Scientist 902 Division Avenue Tacoma, Washington
- First Church of Christ, Scientist 902 Division Avenue; Tacoma, Washington

First Church of Christ, Scientist
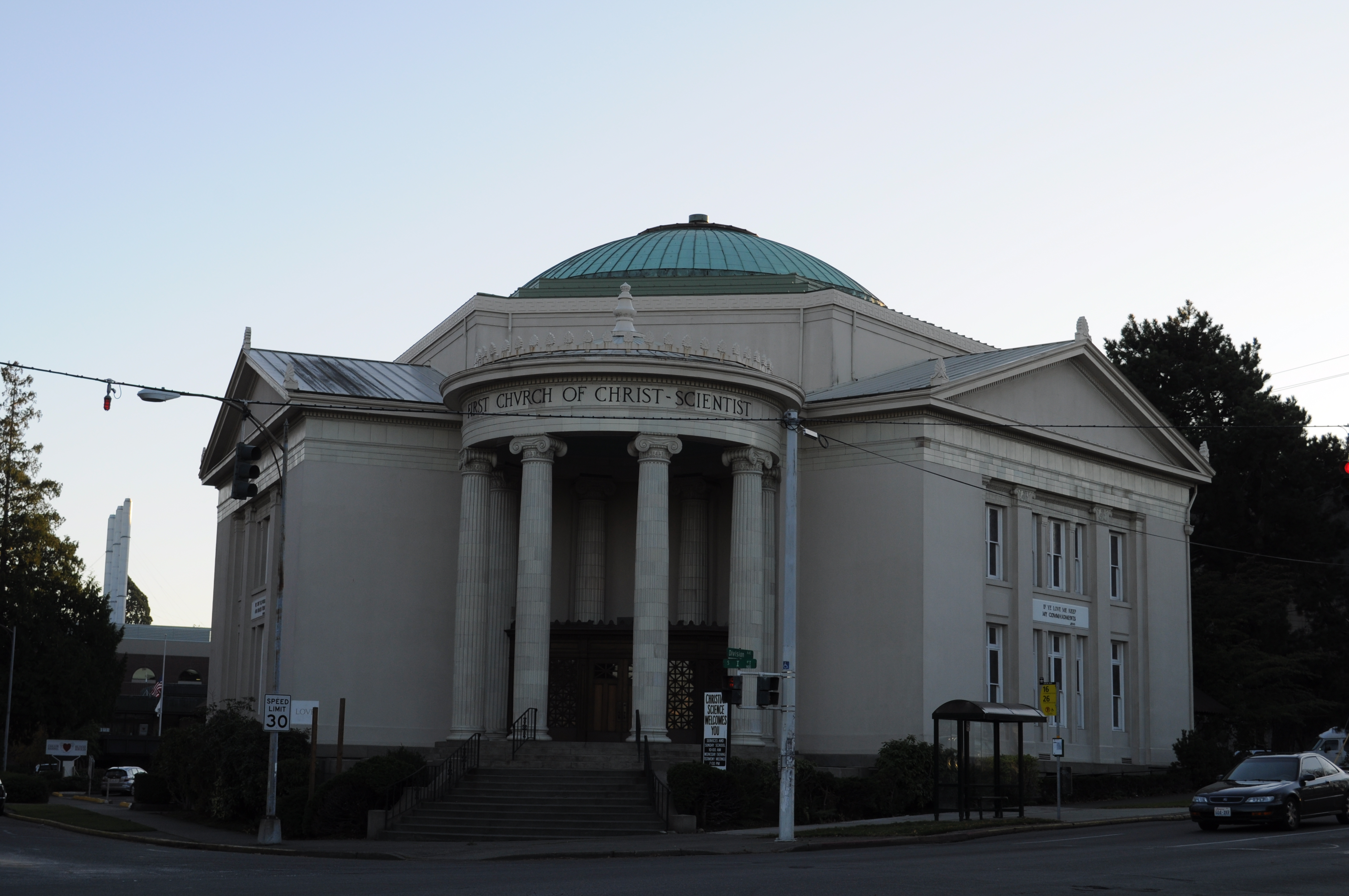
- Interactive map of the First Church of Christ, Scientist area

General information
- Architectural style: Classical Revival
- Location: United States
- Construction started: 1908
- Completed: 1911
- Cost: $45,000
- Client: First Church of Christ, Scientist

Design and construction
- Architect: Frederick Heath

First Church of Christ, Scientist is a historic Christian Science church building located at 902 Division Avenue at the corner of I (Eye) Street in Tacoma, Washington. Designed in the Classical Revival style by noted as well as prolific Tacoma architect Frederick Heath, it was built at a cost of $45,000 between 1908 and 1911. It was the second building built by the congregation on this site, the first being a 1901 wooden structure seating 300 that was torn down in 1908. On June 2, 1911, the first service was held in the new church. After becoming debt free, the new church was dedicated in 1921.

== History ==
Established in 1894, the church held services in a rented hall at 1113½ South Tacoma Avenue before moving to the present site. During construction of the present building, the church met in the now razed Masonic Temple at 740 St. Helens Avenue.

== Current status ==
Today First Church is still an active branch of the Christian Science Mother Church and is still located in this building.
