= Key Bank Center =

Historic building in Tacoma, Washington, United States

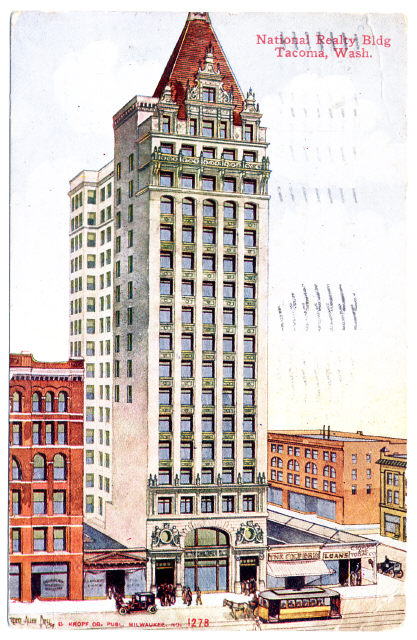
- Postcard published c.1910s
- Interactive map of the Key Bank Center area
- Former names: National Realty Building; Puget Sound National Bank Building

Record height
- Tallest in Washington state from 1911 to 1914^{[I]}
- Preceded by: U.S. Bank Building (Spokane)
- Surpassed by: Smith Tower (Seattle)

General information
- Type: Commercial offices
- Location: 1119 Pacific Avenue; Tacoma, Washington
- Coordinates: 47.2526°N 122.4379°W
- Construction started: 1909
- Completed: 1911

Height
- Roof: 70.71 m (232.0 ft); 56.1 m (184 ft)

Technical details
- Floor count: 16
- Floor area: 8,919 sq ft (828.6 m^{2})
- Lifts/elevators: 3

Design and construction
- Architect: Heath, Gove and Bell

Key Bank Center, formerly the Puget Sound National Bank Building, is a 16-floor high-rise in Tacoma, Washington. When completed as the National Realty Building in 1911, the 71 m (233 ft) tower was the tallest building in the state of Washington until surpassed by Seattle's Smith Tower in 1914. Key Bank later sold the tower and moved into the building at the corner (1101 Pacific) which now houses the South Puget Sound District Offices of Key Bank as well as its Tacoma Main Branch office.

The tower, with marble quarried in Alaska, was designed by Frederick Heath.
