= Rialto Theater (Tacoma, Washington) =

- U.S. National Register of Historic Places
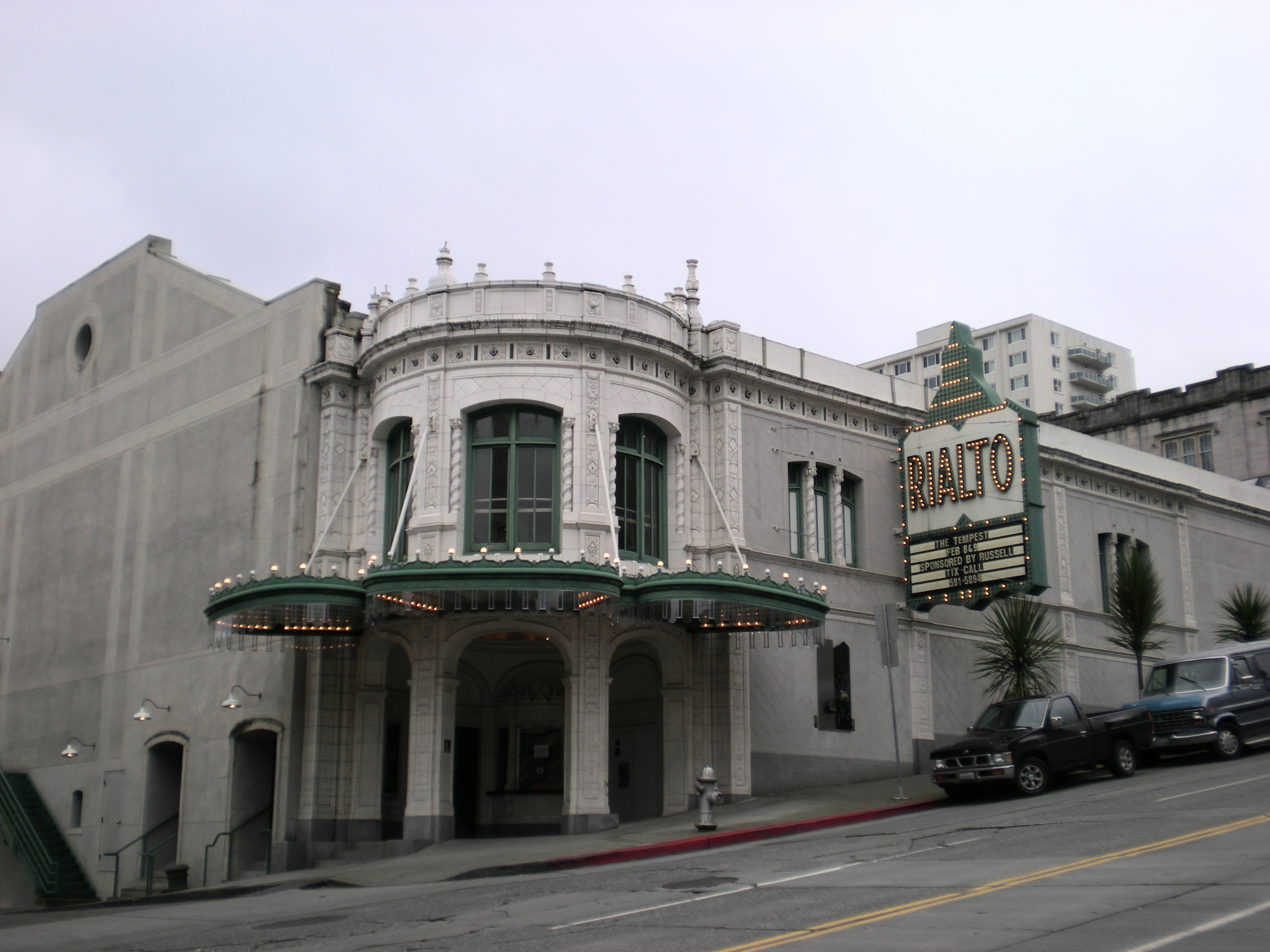

- Location within Washington (state)
- Location: 310 Ninth St., Tacoma, Washington
- Coordinates: 47°15′18″N 122°26′24″W
- Architect: Borhek, Roland E.
- Architectural style: Classical Revival
- MPS: Movie Theaters in Washington State MPS
- NRHP reference No.: 92001041
- Added to NRHP: August 21, 1992

The Rialto Theatre in Tacoma, Washington was built in 1918 to showcase movies. Its design reflects the affluence following World War I. It reflects the character of a palace and is the result of efforts by entrepreneur Henry T. Moore and Tacoma architect Roland E. Borhek. Designed to hold 1500 patrons (revised to 742 today) and retail space. The two-and-a-half-story structure is in the historic downtown of Tacoma. The area has long been associated with theaters and entertainment. The theater is freestanding, with a dramatic view on an incline with a classical façade sheathed of glazed white terra cotta. Both the interior and exterior retain most of the original design of Roland E. Borhek. The theater has an auditorium, proscenium with stage, a relocated projection booth, balcony, lobby, and commercial space. It has been altered with the removal of the storefronts and marquee. On the inside, the lobby's decorative ceiling has been hidden and the concession areas expanded.

It was listed on the National Register of Historic Places in 1992.

The building still houses entertainment and commercial activities (Tacoma City Theaters)

== Exterior ==
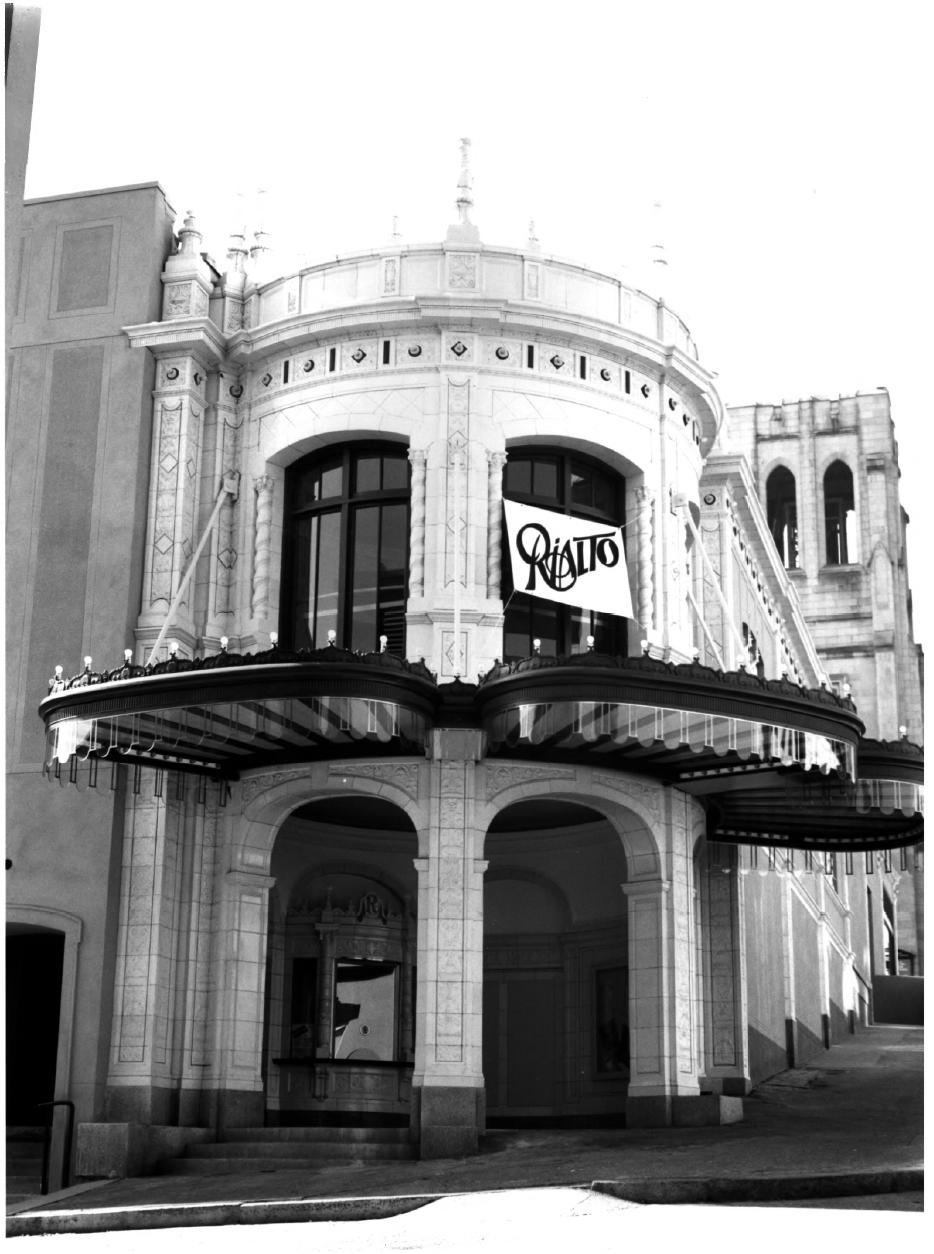
Rialto Theaters main entrance, showing canopy, Tacoma, Washington.

Located on 9th Street between Market Street and "C" Court. The rectangular theater is 120 feet (37 m) along 9th Street and 90 feet (27 m) on Market Street and "C" Court. The Ninth Street front presents a trapezoid appearance as the street rises a full story from the east corner on "C" Court to the west corner on Market Street. Originally, three storefronts were located along 9th street with doors on the incline.

The walls are patterned, buff-toned stucco with a muted backdrop for the classical decorative features. The decorative features are glazed, white terra cotta and applied around the main entrance. The roof above the auditorium is gabled and flat, abutting the parapets. It is brick and hollow clay tile construction with a steel truss roof system over the auditorium. Reinforced concrete beams support the proscenium arch and balcony. The main entrance is rounded at the northeast corner and sheathed in the terra cotta. The classical decorative features are concentrated around the entrance. Three arched openings form a semi-circular arcaded entry with a ticket window, a double leaf glass door, and terrazzo flooring and marble kickplating. A replicated three-part flower petal marquee projects out over the entranceway. The second story is enclosed and capped with decorative parapet with lighted finials. The fenestration on the upper facade of the turret-like corner mirrors the arcaded entry below and features three sets of segmented arch windows. The remainder of the primary facade is less ornamented. The stuccoed wall surface is divided into six bays along the length by terra cotta piers of classical design. The decorative terra cotta parapet extends the entire length with lighted finials where the piers abut the cornice line. Adjacent to the main entry, the upper story of the first three bays features fenestration and an ornamented cornice. Lighted finials smaller than the pier finials adorn the parapet. Storefronts occupied the first bays along the second level from the northwest corner. The Market Street front has a replicated storefront on the corner and a stairwell from an emergency exit serving the auditorium below.

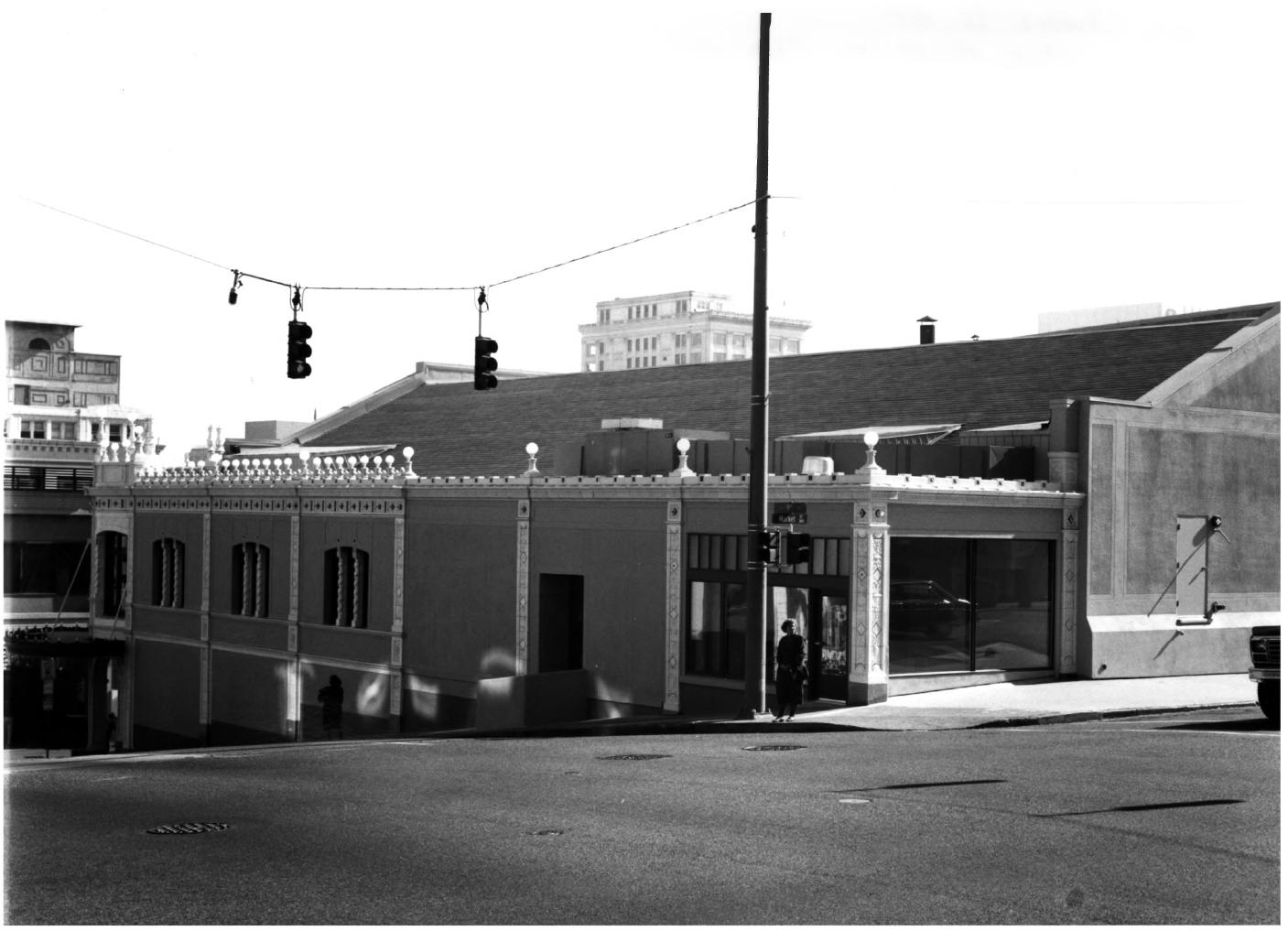
Commercial corner of the Rialto Theater, Tacoma, Washington

== Interior ==
The interior includes a lobby, auditorium with balcony, projection booth, a shallow stage with proscenium, backstage dressing areas, mechanical rooms, and commercial space. The lobby leads into the back of the auditorium. There is a ramp and stairways to the balcony. The balcony is over the lobby, hanging over a part of the main floor. The other spaces are along the length of the auditorium. Along the auditorium on the second floor are the manager's office, restroom facilities, waiting or smoking rooms, storage, and the corner commercial spaces. The lobby features recessed lights and a coved ceiling segmented and decorated with plaster swags of greenery. The ramp parallels the back wall and splits to access the balcony from opposite sides about a third of the way forward. The auditorium is entered from the back with two aisle creating three seating areas. The rectangular two story high hall is designed for movies with a shallow stage and wings. Curves are visible throughout with a cove ceiling and curved walls from the proscenium.. The classical ornamentation is cast plaster on the walls, ceiling, proscenium, and balcony railing. The proscenium displays the richest plaster relief work consisting of an entablature with classical piers. Two cherubs blowing long trumpets and separated by a lighted torch are perched atop the proscenium. On each side of the proscenium is a screened area, which once held organ pipes. The areas are ornamented with cast plaster grills capped by eagles and flags. Lighting comes from chandeliers suspended above, replicated wall sconces, and indirect lighting along the cornice and beneath the organ grills. Above the main entrance is a round room, which served as the anteroom to the ladies restroom. The upper level was redesigned in 1991 and includes restroom facilities and a small rehearsal hall and the replicated corner storefront. The 1991 rehabilitation updated the technical and mechanical systems, restored the lobby, and applied an interior color scheme similar original. The rear wall of the auditorium below the balcony was redesigned as a curved surface and the projection booth was moved to the balcony. Seating was restored to the 1951 remodeling, rather than the original 1918. Other changes were made to conform with handicap access and public safety.

== Bibliographical ==
- Bonney, W. T., History of Pierce County, Pioneer Historical Publishing, 1927.
- Morgan, Murray, Puget Sound, Seattle: University of Washington Press, 1989.
