= Frederick Heath (architect) =

American architect (1861–1953)

- Born: Frederick Henry Heath; April 15, 1861; LaCrosse, Wisconsin
- Died: March 3, 1953 (aged 91); Tacoma, Washington
- Occupation: Architect
- Parent(s): Elizabeth Noyes; William Heath
- Buildings: Paradise Inn at Mount Rainier; Stadium High School

Frederick Heath (April 15, 1861 – March 3, 1953) was an American architect responsible for numerous projects in Tacoma, Washington. He worked out of his own office and as a senior partner at architectural firms. He was involved with Spaulding, Russell & Heath (with Ambrose J. Russell), and Heath & Gove (later Heath, Gove & Bell). His work included designs for several historic and notable schools, churches, stadiums, and commercial properties.

== Background ==
Heath was born in LaCrosse, Wisconsin, and raised in Minnesota, where he attended Powell's Academy. His father was William Heath and his mother Elizabeth Noyes. He was of English ancestry and his ancestors included General William Heath who served on the staff of General George Washington.

== Career ==
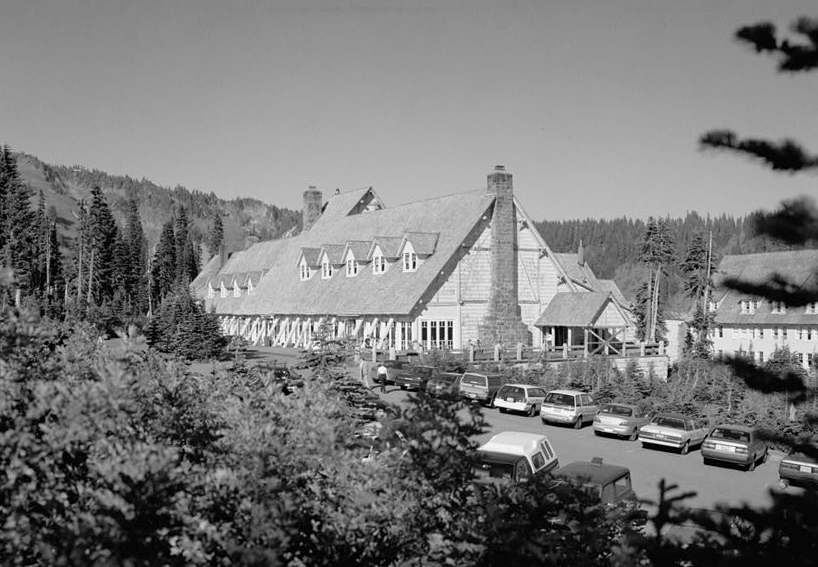
Paradise Inn (Washington) at Mount Rainier was built in 1915

Heath started off as a printer before working on architectural drafts in the office of Warren H. Hayes, where he was chief draftsman, for ten years. He helped design many buildings in Minneapolis and St. Paul, Minnesota. He also worked on a large number of churches in the U.S. and many schools.

=== Work in Tacoma ===
Stadium High School

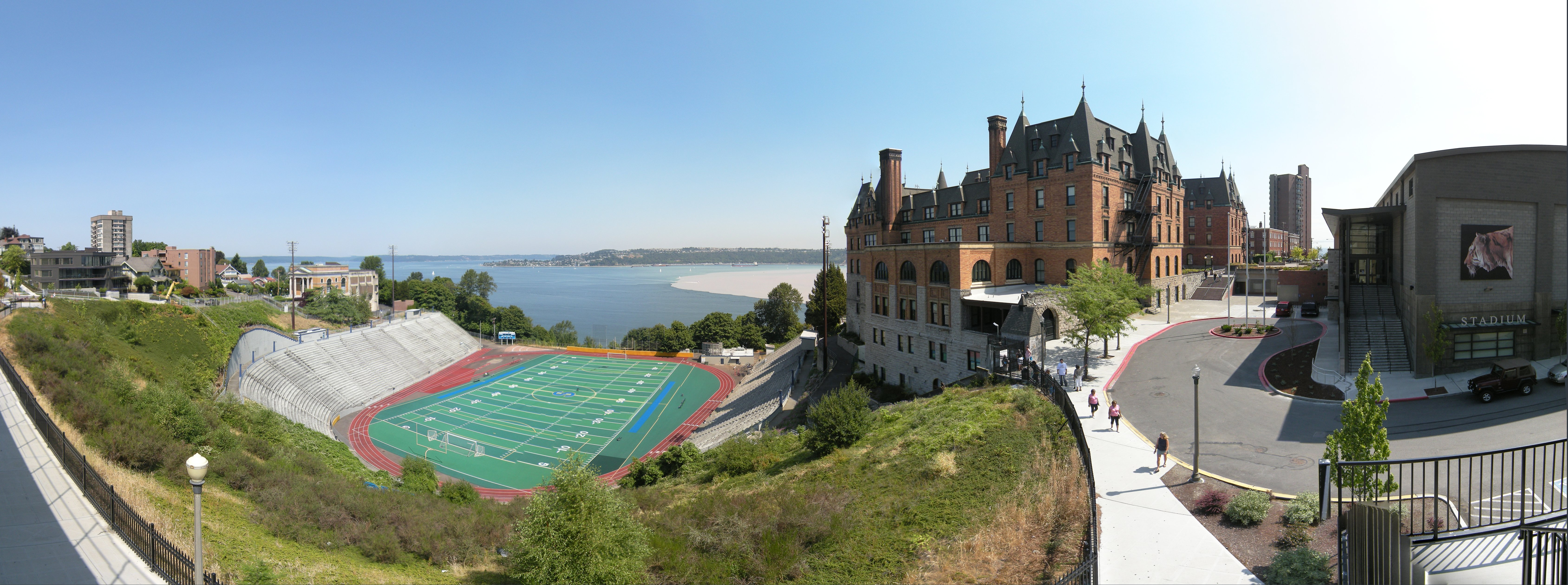
Stadium High School and its bowl stadium

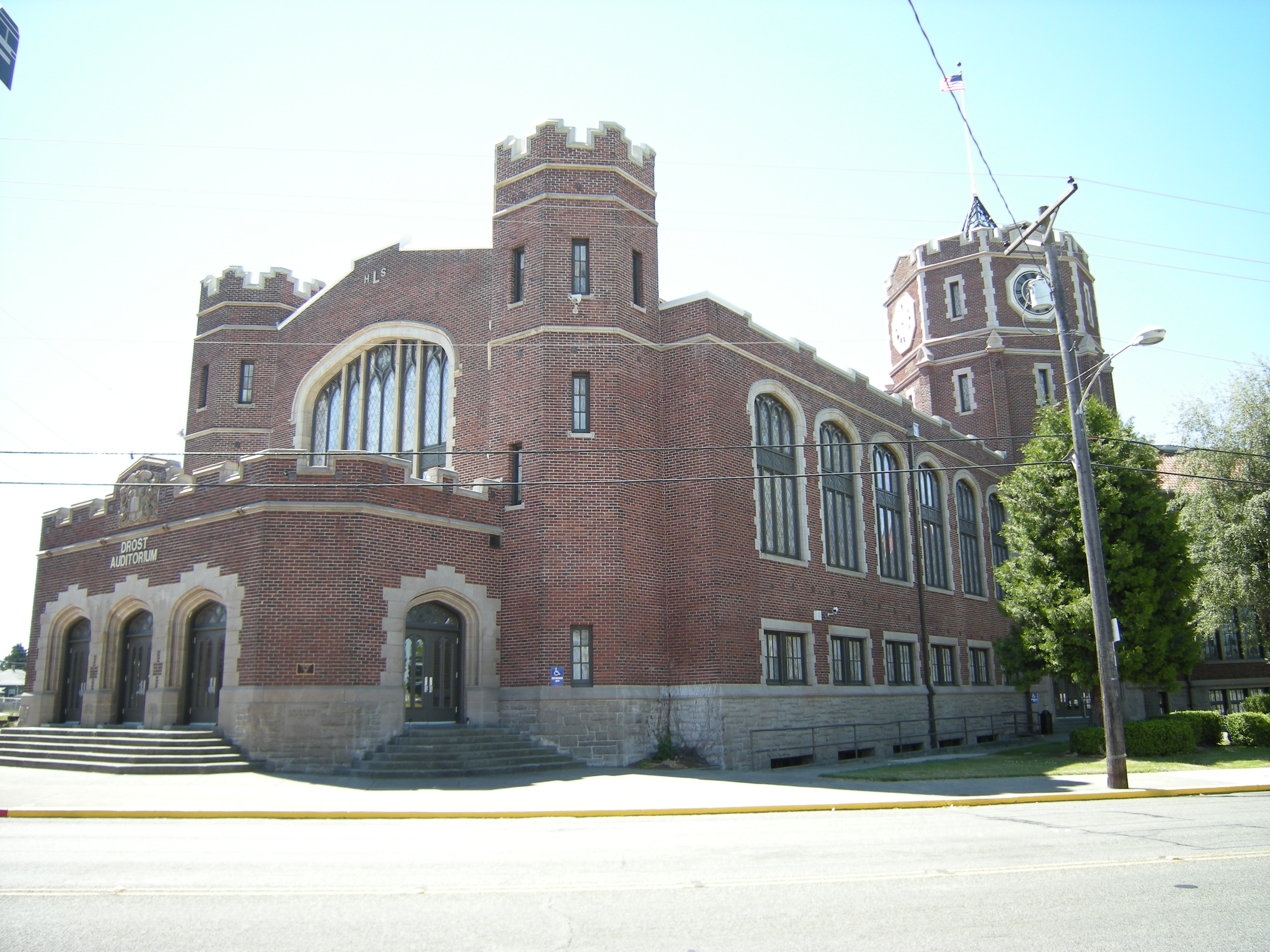
The English Collegiate Gothic style Lincoln High School in Tacoma

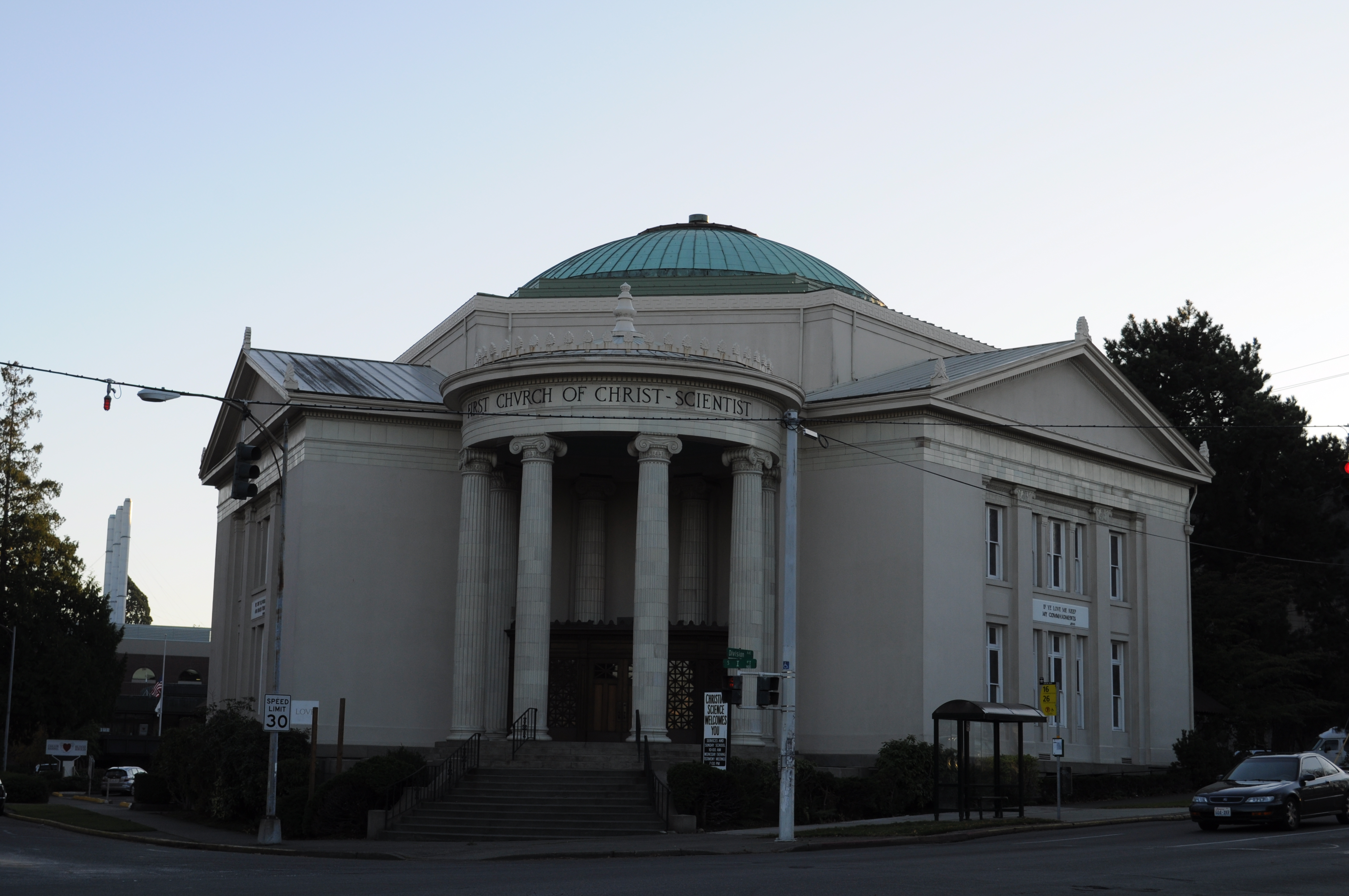
First Church of Christ Scientist in Tacoma

Heath arrived in Washington at age 34 and started working in 1898, establishing his practice in 1901. The buildings he designed have been said to include "some of the most notable and beautiful structures of the city."

Heath was the City of Tacoma's official school architect. He also designed the Masonic temple in North Yakima along the lines of interpretive reconstructions of King Solomon's Temple. He planned the 18-story National Realty Building in Tacoma— at the time the tallest building west of the Mississippi River— as well as a number of schools, such as Stadium High School (the original building designed by Hewitt & Hewitt of Philadelphia was burned, leaving just a shell), Lincoln High School, Central School, and Oakland Alternative High School. Heath's work also includes St. Patrick's, First Church of Christ Scientist, and First Lutheran, First Baptist. He is credited alone with the Forbes P. Haskil, Jr. residence at 521 North Ainsworth (1906).

His designed the 1914 public library on Railroad Avenue and Fifth, Stadium Bowl in Tacoma, and Paradise Inn at Mount Rainier.

Heath was known as the "Father of the Stadium" for his work on Stadium Bowl in Tacoma, one of his best-known projects. Fellow architect Ambrose J. Russell worked in his Tacoma office.

He designed the Nereides Baths, which were located in Point Defiance Park between 1906 and 1931. The "eclectic building was constructed of logs and somewhat resembled a Swiss chalet". It was an attraction for the area that included Tacoma's first indoor swimming pool. Heath served as president of the park board from 1911 until 1916. His "600 projects in the Northwest and in Tacoma" included Tacoma's St. Patrick's, First Church of Christian Scientist, First Lutheran and First Baptist. He also completed store designs for "the old" Rhodes and Bon Marche department stores on Broadway. Heath continued to work until two weeks before he died in March 1953, "just a month shy of his 92nd birthday." Heath also worked on designs for the Greek Theater (Los Angeles) in Griffith Park, Los Angeles.

Heath was a member of several organizations including: Member, Commercial Club of Tacoma, Tacoma, WA,1909-1917; Member, Knights of Pythias, Commerce Lodge #7, 1906-1917; Life Member, Mason's Lebanon Lodge #104; Thirty-second degree Mason and Noble of Mystic Shire, 1917; Mason, Royal Arch Chapter, The Red Cross of Constantine; Thirty-second degree, Tacoma Consistory of Scottish Rite, 1910

Heath married Mabel Fallensbee in January 1885, and had a daughter and two sons.

== Heath, Gove & Bell ==
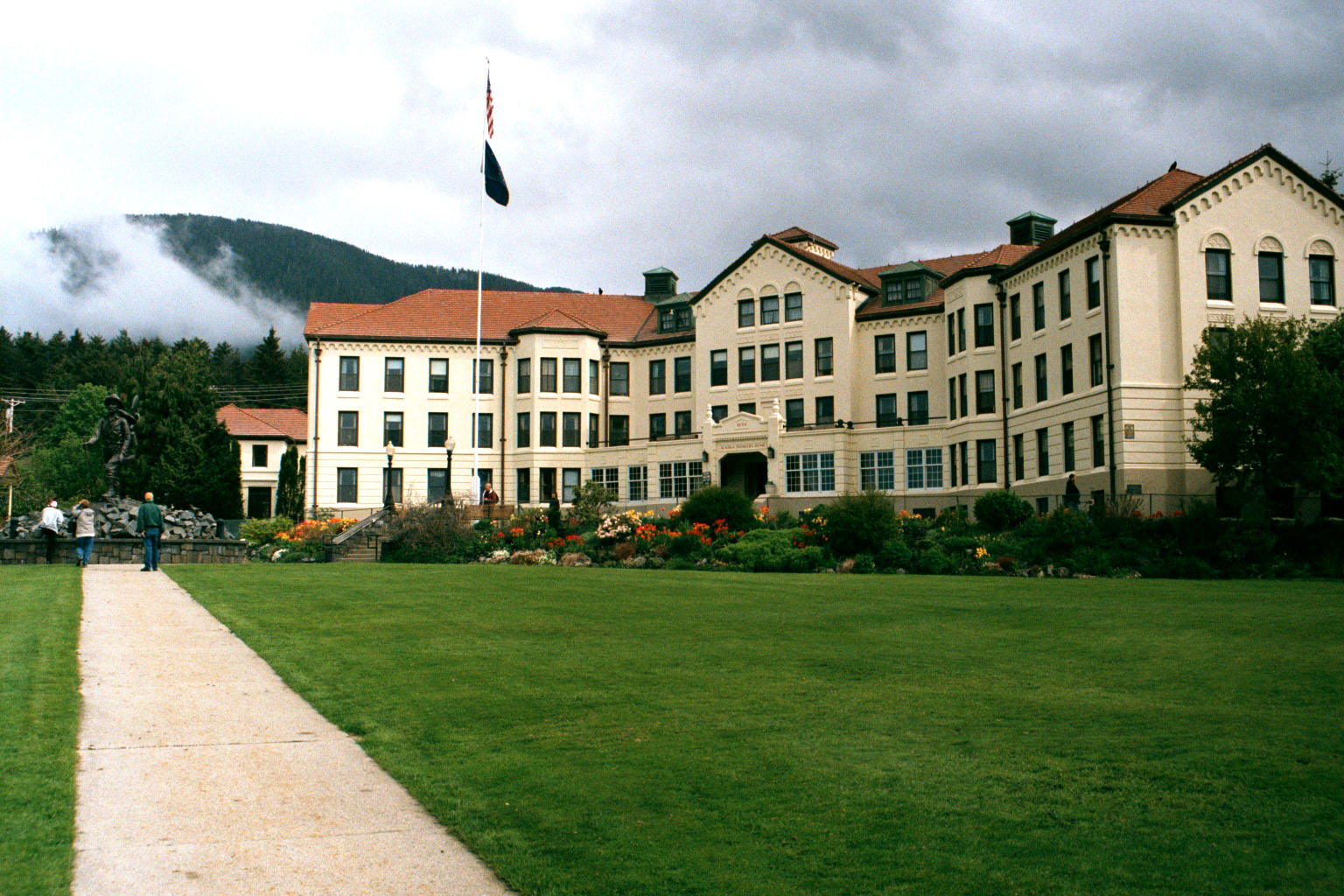
The Sitka Pioneer Home

Heath's firm, Heath, Gove & Bell, designed the 6th Avenue Baptist Church, the Masonic Home of Washington in Des Moines, and the Sitka Pioneers' Home in Sitka, Alaska. Heath was also involved in the Spaulding, Russell & Heath (Spaulding was a marine architect and was only with the firm for a year) was designed the Frederick H. Murray Residence at 402 North Sheridan Avenue (1901) and the Burton A. Moore Residence at 414 North Sheridan Avenue (1901) in the Tacoma's historic North Slope area. The firm was contracted to supervise the reconstruction of Olympia's old state capitol building after a fire.

== Legacy ==
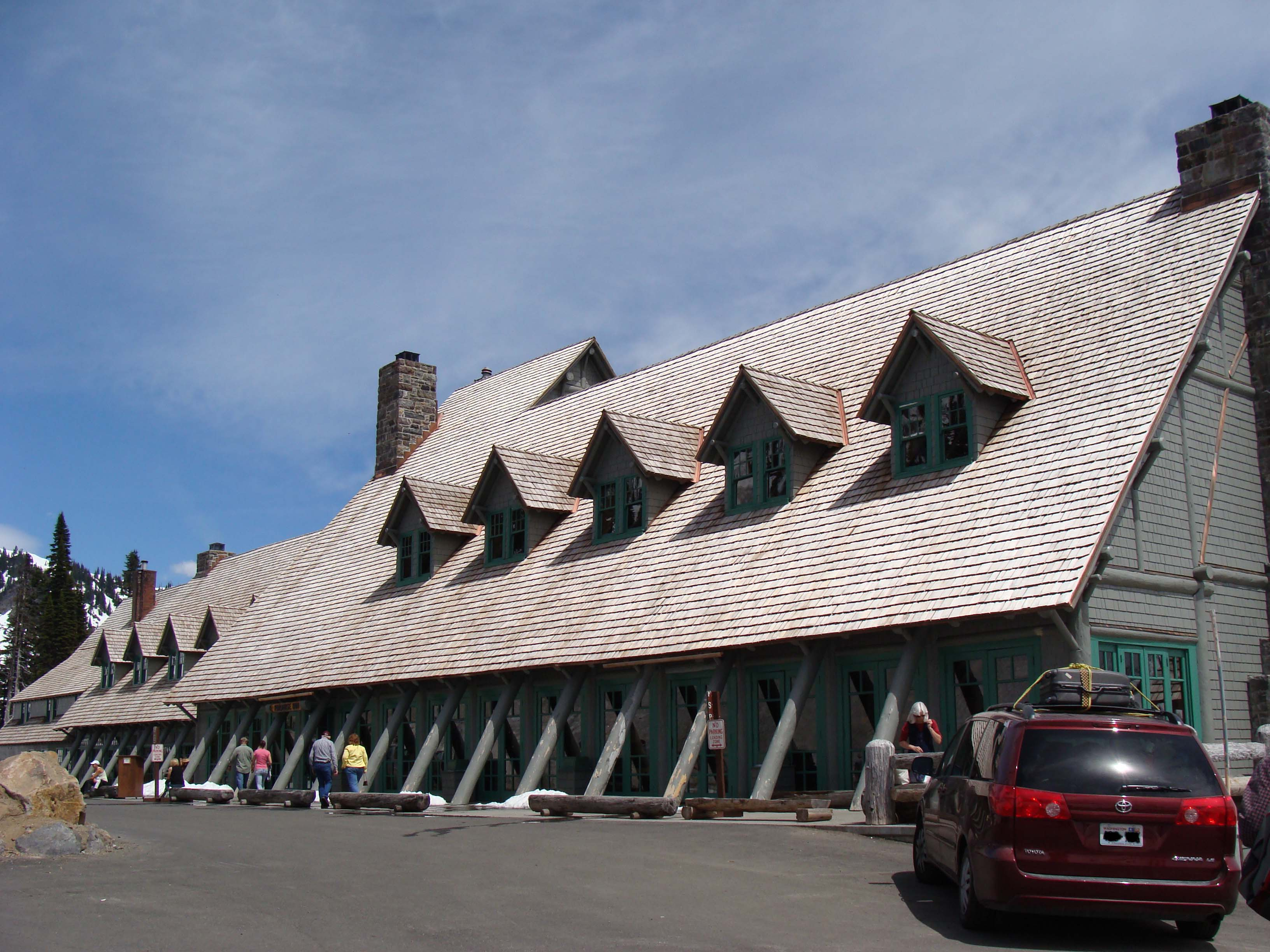
Paradise Inn in 2008 after renovations

The Paradise Inn at Mount Rainier (1915) that Heath's firm designed is listed as a landmark on the National Register of Historic Places and the building was declared a National Historic Landmark in 1987.

Pythian Temple was added to the National Register of Historic Places on August 23, 1985.

Stadium High School, featured in the 1999 film 10 Things I Hate About You, underwent a two-year $80 million renovation starting in 2004. The work won several awards.

The Masonic Home of Washington's library was featured in the 2013 film “The Maury Island Incident”.

In 2008, plans for restorations and renovations of historic Tacoma schools, including several designed by Heath and his firm Heath & Gove, were discussed.

Stadium High School and the Pythian Temple, housing the fraternal Order of the Knights of Pythias, were featured by the Society of Architectural Historians Marian Dean Ross Pacific Northwest Chapter in their summer 2008 newsletter. The group reported that the Pythias order remains active and is working to preserve its 1906 building and received grants for work on the Knight's of Castle Hall, a "two-story hall, completely hidden within the building's interior, is a rich confection of early 20th Century woodwork, plaster, lighting, murals and carpeting."

== Some of Heath's completed projects ==
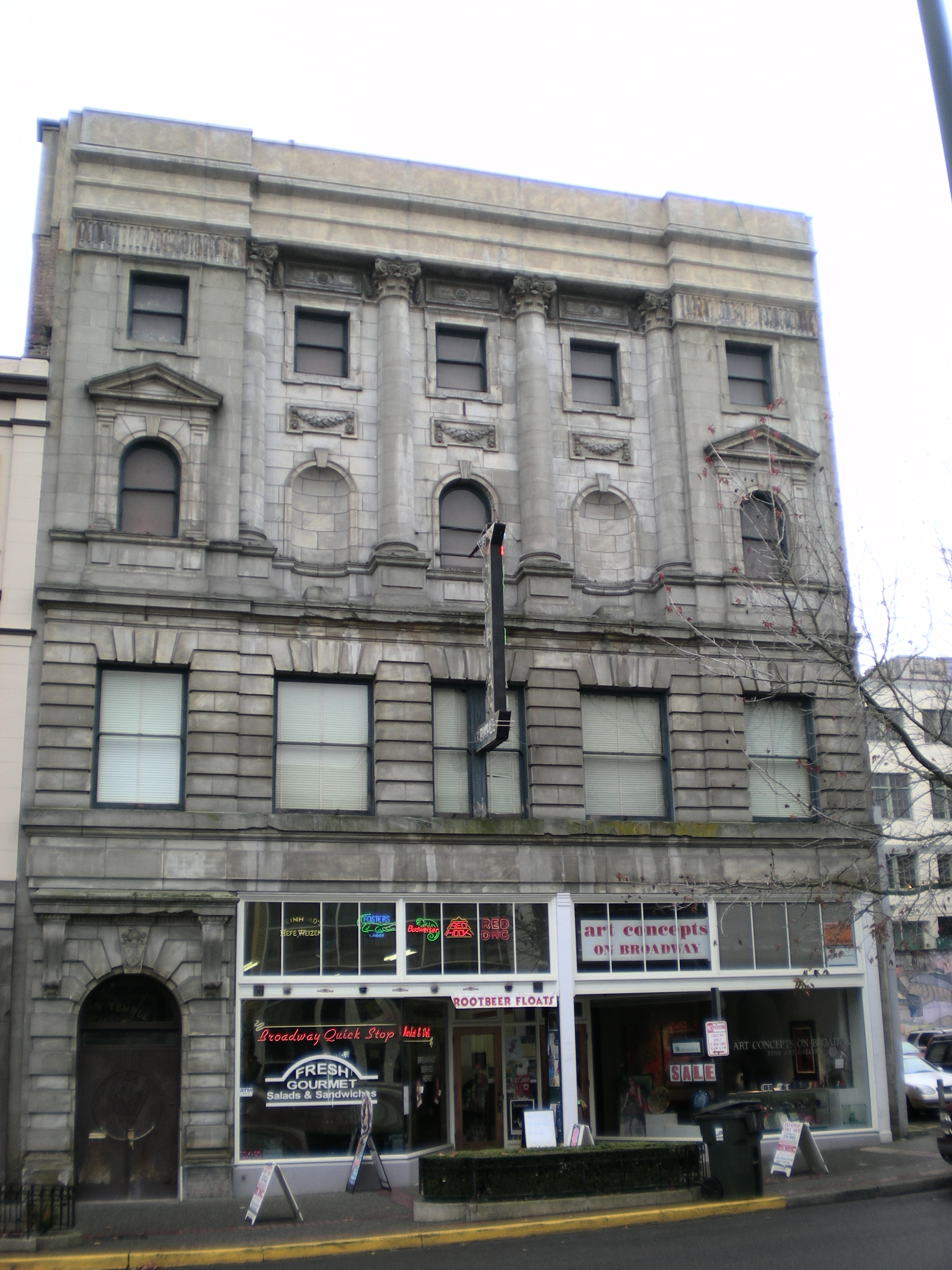
Pythian Temple (Tacoma, Washington)

- Pythian Temple 924-9261/2 Broadway, Tacoma (1906) Listed on the National Register of Historic Places
- Stadium High School, 111 N E St, Tacoma (1906)
- Tacoma Grocery Co. building, 2108-12 Pacific Avenue (1906)
- Morris-Miller Co. building, 2102-06 Pacific Avenue (1906)
- Bowes Building 100 South 9th Street, Tacoma (1907) in Tacoma
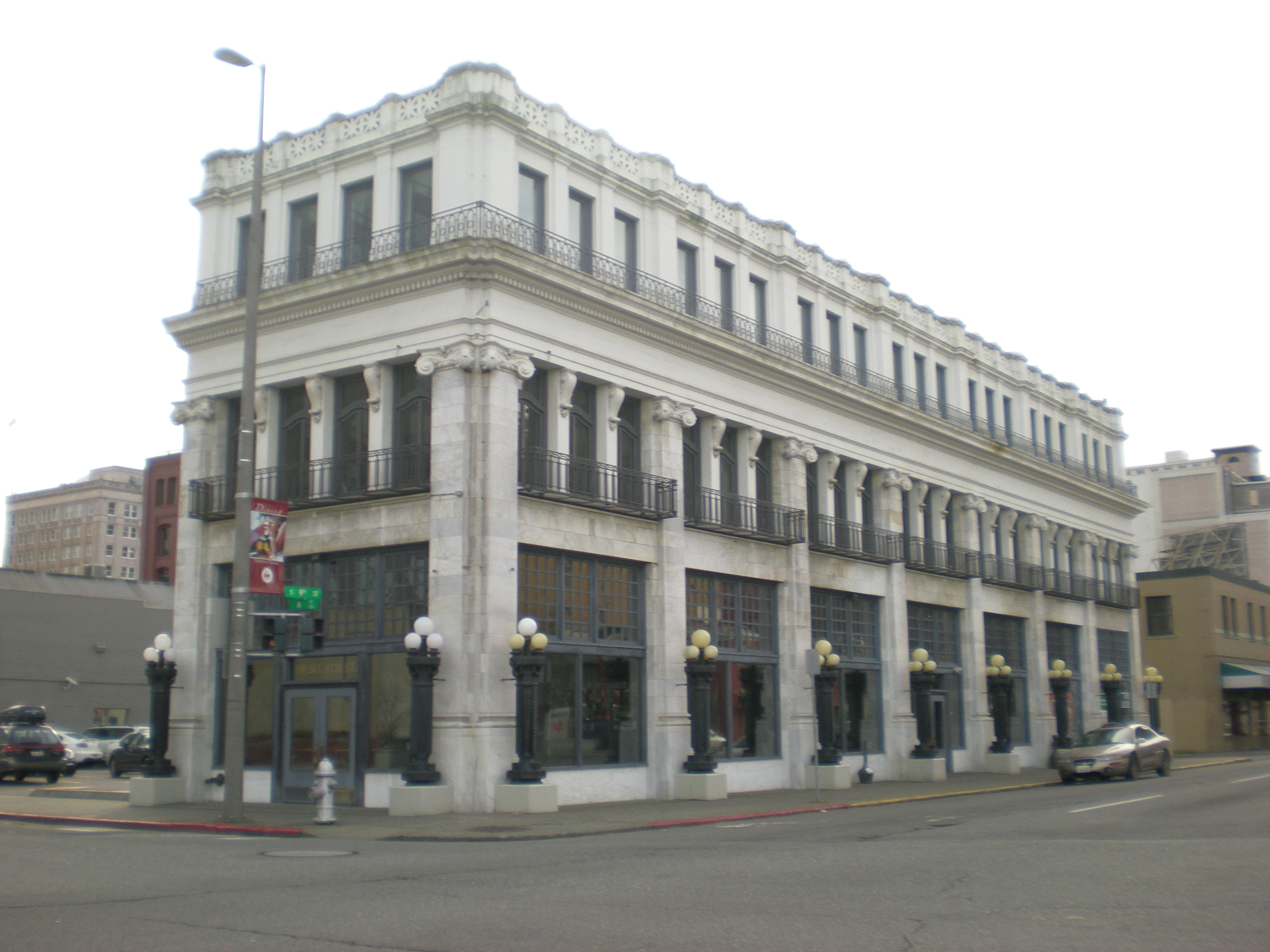
  Bowes Building
- McKinley Elementary School at 3702 McKinley Ave. (East Side) (1908)
- Barlow Annex at 3012 S. 59th St. (South Tacoma) (1910)
- Fern Hill Elementary at 8442 S. Park (South Tacoma) (1911) A Heath and Gove project.
- Central School at 601 South 8th Street (New Tacoma) (1912) A Heath and George Gove project.
- Oakland Alternative High School at 3319 South Adams Street (South End) (1912) A Heath and Gove project.
- Park Avenue School at 6701 S. Park Ave. (South End) (1912) A Heath and Gove project.
- Public library on Railroad and Fifth in Shelton, WA
- Lincoln High School, 701 South 37th Street, Tacoma (1913)
- Paradise Inn at Mount Rainier (1915)
- National Realty Building (once home to Heritage Bank and Puget Sound National Bank Building) 1119 Pacific Avenue, Tacoma (1911) (16 floors) Heath, Gove & Bell
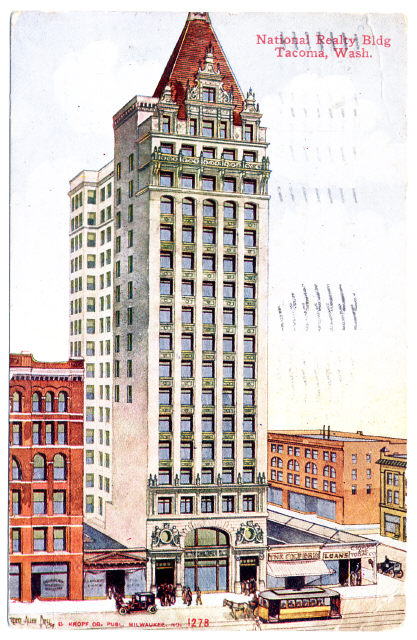
  National Realty Company Bldg, Tacoma, Washington
- First Church of Christ Scientist (1908–1911) (across the street from Wright Park) in Tacoma, Washington
- Trommald Building (1915), Enumclaw, Washington
- Auburn Masonic Temple at 10 Auburn Way, Auburn, Washington (1924) Heath, Gove & Bell

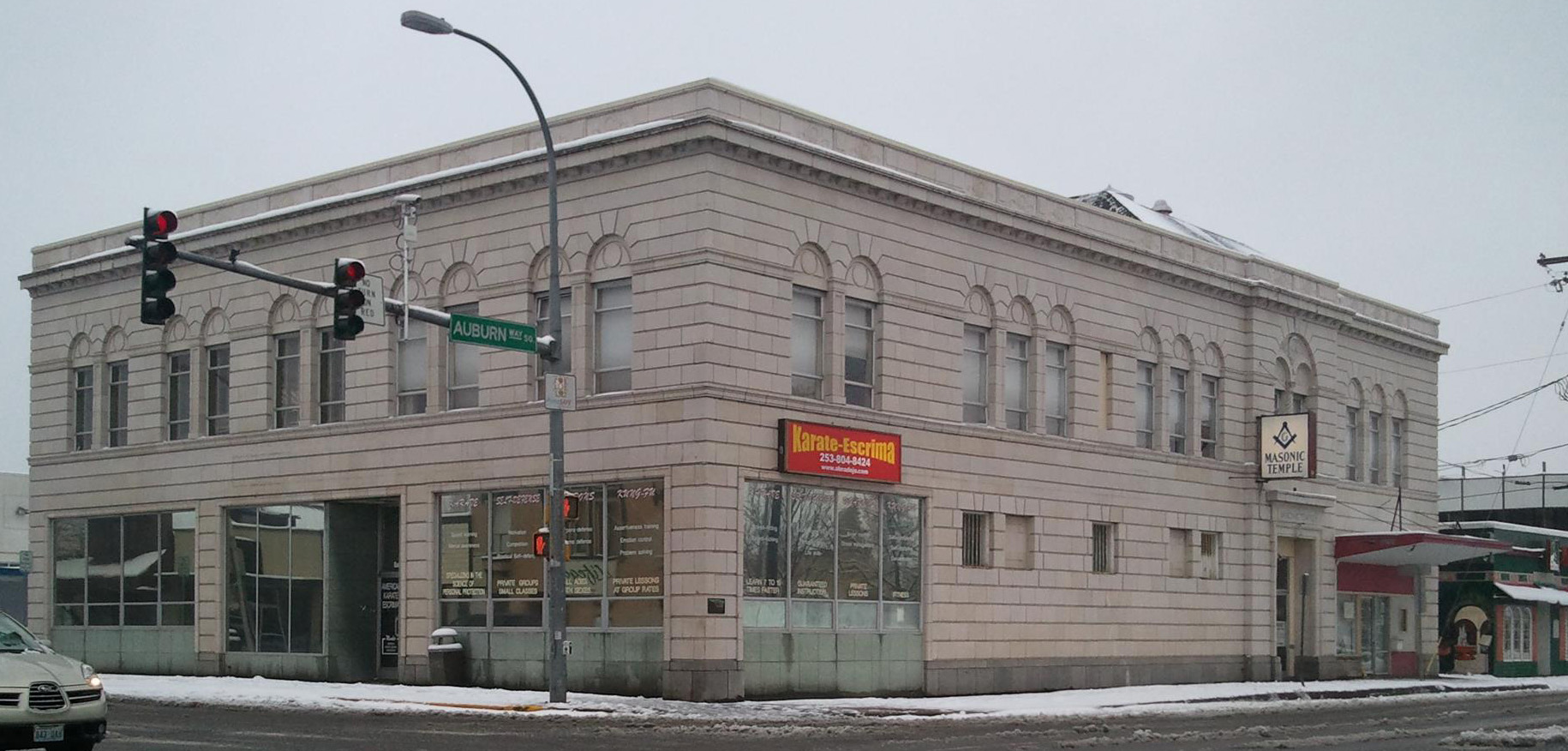
Auburn Masonic Temple 2014

- Masonic Home of Washington, 23660 Marine View Dr S, Des Moines, Washington (1926) Heath, Gove & Bell
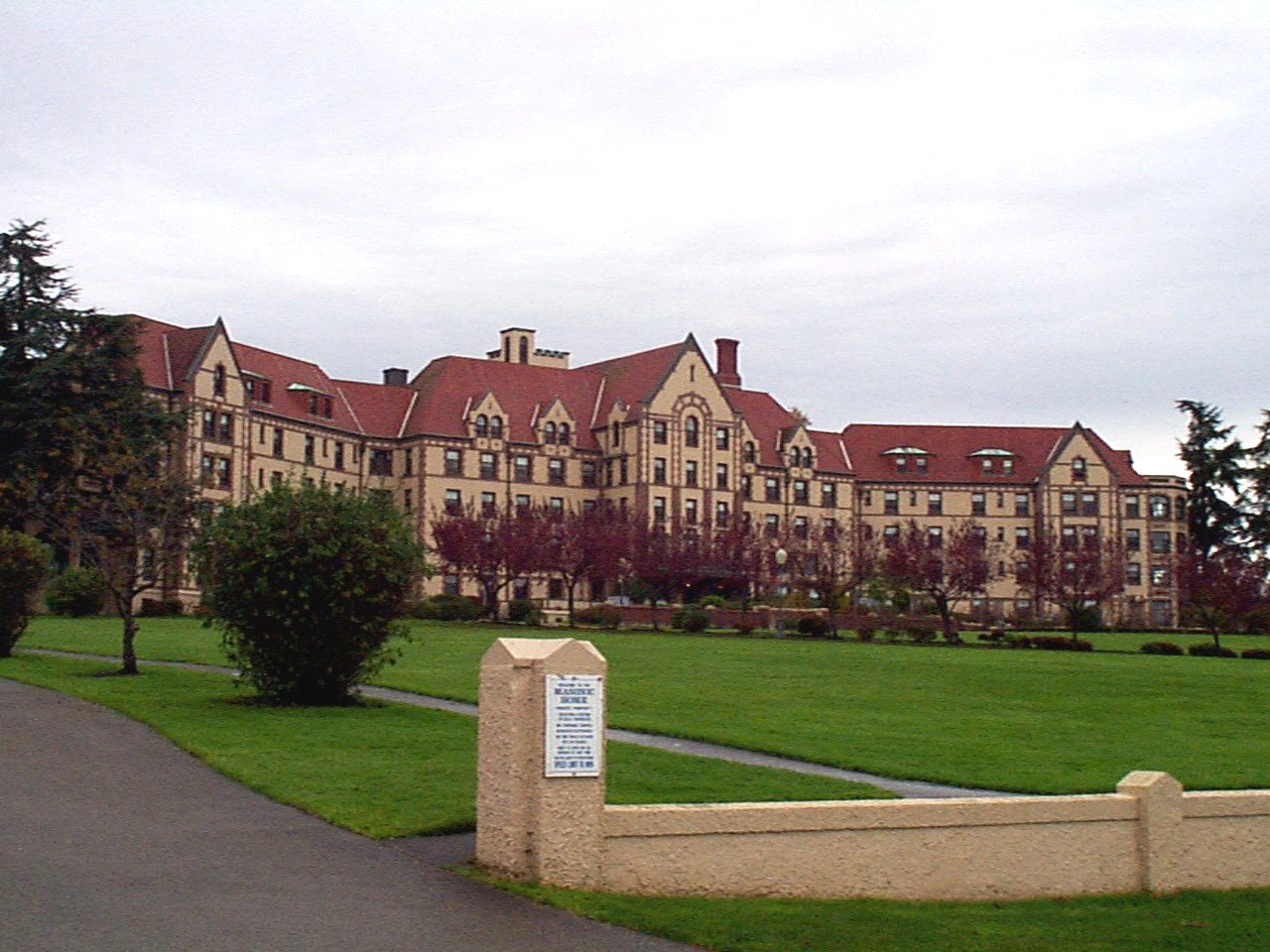
  Masonic Home of Washington
- Wilkeson School, State Route 165, Wilkeson, Washington

=== Parks ===
Heath drew up plans for an open air 10,000 seat amphitheater that was proposed for Mount Rubidoux in Riverside, California in 1918. The theater was to be used for conventions and the "established" Easter sunrise service.

- Nereides Baths (1906) located in Point Defiance Park between 1906 and 1931
- Greek Theater in Griffith Park
