= Lists of lakes of the United States =

This is a list of lakes (including reservoirs) in the United States, grouped by state.

== By state ==
=== Alabama ===
- Edgewood Lake

=== California ===
- Beck Lakes
- Kinman Pond
- Sinaloa Lake
- Millerton Lake
- Shaver Lake
- Bass Lake
- Lake Tahoe
- Shasta Lake
- Mono Lake
- Clear Lake Reservoir
- Lake Havasu
- Donner Lake
- Lake Almanor
- Lake Berryessa
- Lake Cachuma
- Big Bear Lake
- Lake Oroville
- Folsom Lake
- Tulare Lake
- Lake Sonoma
- Silverwood Lake
- Castaic Lake
- Salton Sea
- Convict Lake
- Honey Lake
- Perris Reservoir
- Eagle Lake
- Trinity Lake
- New Melones Lake
- Goose Lake
- Pyramid Lake
- Don Pedro Lake
- San Luis Reservoir
- June Lake
- Lake Nacimiento
- Tioga Lake
- Tule Lake
- Lake Hemet
- Whiskeytown Lake
- Manzanita Lake
- Isabella Lake
- Lake Arrowhead Reservoir
- Twin Lakes
- Lost Lake
- Tenaya Lake
- Elizabeth Lake
- Camanche Reservoir
- Lake Casitas
- Owens Lake
- Diamond Valley Lake
- Lake Elsinore
- Snag Lake
- Serene Lakes
- Lake Sabrina
- Lake Cuyamaca
- Lake Cahuilla (reservoir)

=== Connecticut ===
- Amston Lake
- Ashford Lake
- Aspetuck Reservoir
- Bantam Lake (largest natural lake in Connecticut)
- Barkhamsted Reservoir
- Lake Beseck
- Breakneck Pond
- Burr Pond
- Candlewood Lake (largest lake in Connecticut)
- Lake Chaffee
- Lake Connecticut (paleolake)
- Converse Lake
- Crystal Lake
- Deer Lake
- Lake Forest, Bridgeport
- Lake Gaillard
- Gardner Lake
- Great Hollow Lake
- Lake Hayward
- Higganum Reservoir
- Highland Lake
- Hop Brook Lake
- Lake Kenosia
- Killingly Pond
- Lake Lillinonah
- Maltby Lakes
- Mansfield Hollow Lake
- Mashapaug Lake
- Millers Pond
- Pinewood Lake
- Lake Pocotopaug
- Quaddick Reservoir
- Lake Quassapaug
- Quinebaug Lake
- Round Pond
- Lake Saltonstall
- Saugatuck Reservoir
- Shenipsit Lake
- Squantz Pond
- Success Lake
- Tuxis Pond
- Twin Lakes
- Wangumbaug Lake
- Lake Waramaug
- Lake Waubeeka
- West Hartford Reservoir
- West Thompson Lake
- Wetherell Pond
- Lake Whitney
- Lake Wintergreen
- Lake Wononscopomuc (deepest natural lake in Connecticut)
- Lake Zoar

=== Delaware ===
- Hoopes Reservoir
- Lums Pond (largest lake in Delaware)
- Lake Comegys
- Silver Lake
- Moores Lake

=== Florida ===
- Lake Alice
- Lake Altamaha
- Lake Angelo
- Lake Apopka
- Lake Aurora
- Lake Bennet
- Lake Broward
- Bonnet Lake
- Blue Cypress Lake
- Lake Center
- Lake Clay
- Lake Conway
- Counterfeit Lake
- Lake Crescent
- Lake Damon
- Dance Lake
- Lake Denton
- Dinner Lake
- Lake Dot
- Lake Easy
- Echo Lake
- Lake Echo
- Lake Effie
- Engineers Lake
- Lake Eva
- Lake Florence
- Lake Francis
- Lake George
- Lake Gross
- Lake Harney
- Lake Harris
- Lake Horney
- Lake Iamonia
- Lake Ina
- Lake Isis
- Lake Istokpoga
- Lake June in Winter
- Lake Katherine
- Lake Kissimmee
- Lake Lelia
- Lake Letta
- Lochloosa Lake
- Lake Lotta
- Lake Lucas
- Mallard Lake
- Lake Mariam
- Lake Mary
- Lake Mary Jane
- Lake Maude
- Lake McCoy
- Moody Lake
- Mountain Lodge Lake
- Lake Okeechobee (largest lake in Florida)
- Pabor Lake
- Padgett Lake
- Park Lake
- Lake Placid
- Lake Poinsett
- Lake Rachael
- Red Lake
- Lake Reed
- Lake Ring
- Lake Rousseau
- Sawgrass Lake
- Lake Seminole (extends into Georgia)
- Silver Lake
- Lake Sirena
- Lake Streety
- Sunset Lake
- Lake Tarpon
- Lake Tohopekaliga
- Tower Lakes
- Valkaria Lake
- Lake Verona
- Lake Viola
- Lake Washington
- Lake Weaver
- Lake Weir
- Lake Winder
- Lake Yale

=== Georgia ===
- Lake Allatoona
- Lake Arrowhead
- Bankston Lake
- Lake Blackshear
- Lake Blue Ridge
- Lake Burton
- Carters Lake
- Chatuge Lake (extends into North Carolina)
- Chief McIntosh Lake
- Coleman Pond
- Davenport Lake
- Gannet Lake
- Goat Rock Lake
- Lake Harding (extends into Alabama)
- Lake Hartwell (extends into South Carolina)
- Hard Labor Creek Regional Reservoir
- Houston Lake (Georgia)
- Lot Pond
- Lake Jackson
- Lake Jodeco
- Lake Lanier
- Lake Nottely
- Lake Oconee
- Old Hell Lake
- Lake Oliver
- Lake Peachtree
- Pilcher Pond
- Lake Rabun
- Lake Seminole (extends into Florida)
- Lake Sinclair
- Lake Spivey
- Lake Strom Thurmond (extends into South Carolina. Largest lake in Georgia)
- Tallulah Falls Lake
- Taylors Lake
- Tired Creek Lake
- Lake Tugalo (extends into South Carolina)
- Walter F. George Lake (extends into Alabama)
- West Point Lake (extends into Alabama)

=== Hawaii ===
- Āliapa'akai (Salt Lake), in the Honolulu neighborhood of Salt Lake, Hawaii
- Ālieiki Lake
- Green Lake (Hawaii) (formerly Wai a Pele) (destroyed on 2 June 2018 by an eruption)
- Halaliʻi Lake (largest lake in Hawaii)
- Halulu Lake (largest natural lake in Hawaii)
- Ka Loko Reservoir
- Kauhakō Lake
- Keālia Pond
- Loʻe Lake
- Loko Paakai
- Meyer Lake
- Nonopapa Lake
- Violet Lake (also known as Kiʻowaiokihawahine)
- Lake Waiau
- Lake Wilson (Oahu)

=== Idaho ===
- Bear Lake (extends into Utah)
- Brush Lake
- Lake Cascade
- Lake Coeur d'Alene
- Governor’s Punch Bowl
- Grays Lake
- Henrys Lake
- Lake Lowell (part of the Deer Flat Upper Embankment reservoir)
- Lake Pend Oreille (largest lake in Idaho)
- Payette Lake
- Priest Lake
- Redfish Lake
- Stanley Lake

=== Illinois ===
- Whalon Lake

=== Iowa ===
- Big Creek Lake (Iowa)
- Black Hawk Lake
- Carter Lake
- Clear Lake
- Coralville Lake
- East Okoboji Lake
- Elm Lake (Iowa)
- Five Island Lake
- Goose Lake
- Green Valley Lake (Iowa)
- Hartwick Lake
- High Lake (Iowa)
- Lake Icaria
- Iowa Lake
- Lost Island Lake
- Lost Grove Lake
- Lake Manawa
- Lake Morris
- North Twin Lake
- Lake Odessa (Iowa)
- Okamanpeedan Lake
- Rathbun Lake
- Lake Red Rock (largest lake in Iowa)
- Rock Creek Lake
- Rush Lake
- Saylorville Lake
- Silver Lake
- Spirit Lake
- Storm Lake
- Swan Lake
- Lake Syracuse (Iowa)
- Virgin Lake (Iowa)
- Lake Wapello
- Lake Wawasee (Iowa)
- West Okoboji Lake

=== Kansas ===
- Clinton Lake
- Fall River Lake
- Lake Inman (largest natural lake in Kansas)
- Marion County Lake
- Marion Reservoir
- Milford Lake (largest lake in Kansas)
- Perry Lake
- Pomona Lake
- Shawnee State Fishing Lake
- Tuttle Creek Lake
- Waconda Lake
- Wilson Lake

=== Louisiana ===
- Anacoco Lake
- Bay Long in
- Bayou D'Arbonne Lake
- Lake Bistineau
- Black Lake (Louisiana) (also known as Black-Clear Lake in Natchitoches Parish)
- Black Bayou Reservoir located in Bossier Parish
- Bundick Lake near Dry Creek
- Caddo Lake (extends into Texas)
- Caillou Lake in Terrebonne Parish
- Calcasieu Lake
- Caney Creek Lake in Jackson Parish
- Carencro Lake in Terrebonne Parish
- Catahoula Lake
- Lake Cataouatche
- Lake Chicot in Evangeline Parish
- Lake Claiborne
- Clear Lake in Desoto Parish
- Cocodrie Lake
- Cotile Lake
- Cross Lake in Caddo Parish
- Cypress Lake
- Lake De Cade in Terrebonne Parish
- Dog Lake in Terrebonne Parish
- Eagle Lake
- False River: An (oxbow lake) in Pointe Coupee Parish
- Lake Fausse Pointe
- Lake Fields in Terrebonne Parish
- Flat Lake
- Grand Lake
- Grassy Lake (Louisiana)
- Indian Creek Reservoir
- Jug Lake in Terrebonne Parish
- John K. Kelly-Grand Bayou Reservoir in Red River Parish
- Kincaid Reservoir
- King Lake in Terrebonne Parish
- Lac des Allemands
- Lake Latt: 10.28 mile lake, 7,100 acres (2,900 ha)s in Grant Parish
- Lost Lake
- Lake Maurepas
- Lake Mechant in Terrebonne Parish
- Mountain Bayou Lake
- Mud Lake
- Nantachie Lake
- Negro Lake
- Raccourci Old River (oxbow lake)
- Lake Pagie in Terrebonne Parish
- Lake Palourde
- Pelican Lake in Terrebonne Parish
- Lake Peigneur
- Lake Pontchartrain (largest water body within Louisiana, not a lake but a tidal estuary)
- Poverty Point Reservoir
- Lake Rodemacher in Rapides Parish
- Sabine Lake (extends into Texas)
- Saline Lake (with Chee Chee Bay in Winn Parish)
- Lake Salvador
- Six Mile Lake
- Spanish Lake in St. Martin and Iberia Parishes
- Three Mile Lake in St. Landry Parish: North of US 190, west of Krotz Springs, just west of the US 71 junction, listed as Port Barre.
- Toledo Bend Reservoir
- University Lakes: Six lakes in Baton Rouge City Park Lake, Lake Erie, College Lake, Campus Lake, University Lake, and Crest Lake.
- Vernon lake
- Lake Verret
- White Lake

=== Maine ===
- Threemile Pond

=== Maryland ===
Most lakes in the state today were constructed, mostly through dam construction.

- Conowingo Reservoir
- Deep Creek Lake (largest lake in Maryland)
- Lake Habeeb (Rocky Gap Lake)
- Liberty Reservoir
- Loch Raven Reservoir
- Little Patuxent Oxbow Lake (at 50 acres, the largest natural freshwater lake in the state.)
- Prettyboy Reservoir
- Youghiogheny River Lake (extends into Pennsylvania)
- Quarry Lake (one of the deepest lakes in the state of Maryland)

=== Massachusetts ===
- Lake Ashmere
- Assawompset Pond
- Lake Attitash
- Lake Boon
- Brooks Pond
- Lake Buel
- Cady Pond
- Lake Chaubunagungamaug
- Lake Cochichewick
- Lake Cochituate
- Lake Garfield
- Great Herring Pond
- Great Quittacas Pond
- Houghton's Pond
- Lewis Lake
- Long Pond (Lakeville)
- Mashpee Pond
- Lake Massapoag
- Lake Monomonac
- Narragansett Pond
- Lake Onota
- Pocksha Pond
- Pontoosuc Lake
- Prankers Pond
- Quabbin Reservoir (largest lake in Massachusetts)
- Lake Quannapowitt
- Lake Quinsigamond
- Lake Rico
- Lake Sabbatia
- Lake Saltonstall
- Spring Pond
- Tuxbury Pond
- Wakeby Pond
- Walden Pond
- Watson Pond
- Watuppa Ponds
- Wenham Lake
- Winnecunnet Pond
- Lake Wyola
- Greenwater pond

=== Minnesota ===
- Fadden Lake
- Fish Lake Reservoir
- Five Lake
- Jim Cook Lake
- Little Coon Lake
- Little Elbow Lake
- Longyear Lake
- Lyendecker Lake
- Mahla Lake
- Malmedal Lake
- Mandall Lake
- Molly Stark Lake
- Monker Lake
- O'Dowd Lake
- Ogishkemuncie Lake
- Pay Lake
- Peysenske Lake
- Phare Lake
- Picard Lakes
- Plum Lake
- Rat House Lake
- Rat Root Lake
- Rutz Lake
- Sager Lake
- Schendel Lake
- Schilling Lake
- Schutz Lake
- Sellards Lake
- Seven Beaver Lake
- Severance Lake
- Shamineau Lake
- Sheas Lake
- Shields Lake
- Siseebakwet Lake
- Skataas Lake
- Skogman Lake
- Sugar Bush Lake
- Talcot Lake
- Toners Lake
- Tyler Lake
- Tyson Lake
- Vanose Lake
- Waboose Lake
- Warren Lake
- Wells Lake
- White Lily Lake
- White Stone Lake
- Wita Lake
- Winkler Lake

=== Mississippi ===
- Arkabutla Lake
- Lake Bill Waller
- Enid Lake
- Lake Ferguson
- Gainesville Lake
- Grenada Lake (largest lake in Mississippi)
- Hickory Hills Lake
- Marting Lake
- Moon Lake
- Ross Barnett Reservoir
- Sardis Lake
- Lake Tom Bailey
- Lake Washington

=== Missouri ===
Lakes greater than 500 acres:

- Big Lake
- Blue Springs Lake
- Bull Shoals Lake (extends into Arkansas)
- Clearwater Lake
- Fellows Lake
- Longview Lake
- Mark Twain Lake
- Norfork Lake (extends into Arkansas)
- Lake of the Ozarks
- Pomme de Terre Lake
- Smithville Lake
- Lake St. Louis
- Stockton Lake
- Table Rock Lake (extends into Arkansas)
- Lake Taneycomo
- Truman Reservoir (largest lake in Missouri)
- Lake Viking
- Wappapello Lake
- Lake Waukomis

=== Nevada ===
- Angel Lake
- Deep Creek Reservoir
- Humboldt Sink
- Lake Mead (extends into Arizona)
- Pyramid Lake
- Snow Water Lake
- Lake Tahoe (extends into California; largest lake in Nevada)
- Walker Lake

=== New Jersey ===
- Alcyon Lake
- Arrowhead Lake
- Blue Hole
- Budd Lake
- Carasaljo Lake
- Lake Carnegie
- Deal Lake
- Estling Lake
- Green Pond
- Greenwood Lake
- Indian Lake
- Longwood Lake
- Lake Grinnell
- Lake Hopatcong (largest lake in New Jersey)
- Lake Lefferts
- Makepeace Lake
- Muckshaw Ponds
- Lake Musconetcong
- White Meadow Lake
- Lake Rogerene
- Lake Shawnee
- Lake Tappan
- Shepherd Lake
- Spruce Run Lake

=== New Mexico ===
- Abiquiu Lake
- Bluewater Lake
- Bonito Lake
- Brantley Lake
- Caballo Lake
- Clayton Lake
- Conchas Lake
- El Vado Lake
- Elephant Butte Reservoir (largest lake in New Mexico)
- Fenton Lake
- Hackberry Lake
- Heron Lake
- Morphy Lake
- Navajo Lake
- Lake Roberts
- Santa Cruz Lake
- Santa Rosa Lake
- Stinking Lake
- Storrie Lake
- Summer Lake
- Ute Lake

=== New York ===
- Cayuga Lake
- Luxton Lake
- Onondaga Lake
- Owasco Lake
- Seneca Lake (New York)
- Twin Pond

=== North Carolina ===
- Badin Lake
- Blewett Falls Lake
- Lake Brandt
- Lake Cammack
- Chatuge Lake (extends into Georgia)
- Falls Lake
- Lake Gaston (extends into Virginia)
- Graham-Mebane Lake (formerly Quaker Lake)
- Lake Hickory
- Lake Higgins
- High Rock Lake
- Hyco Lake
- Lake James
- Jordan Lake
- Kerr Lake (extends into Virginia)
- Lake Lure
- Lake Mackintosh
- Mayo Lake
- Mountain Island Lake
- Lake Norman (largest lake in North Carolina)
- Price Lake
- Randleman Lake
- Reidsville Lake
- Lake Tillery
- Lake Townsend
- Lake Toxaway
- Tuckertown Lake
- W. Kerr Scott Lake
- White Lake
- Lake Wylie
- Lake Louise

=== North Dakota ===
- Lake Addie
- Lake Arthur
- Alkali Lake
- Lake Ashtabula
- Court Lake
- Lake Darling
- Devils Lake
- Harker Lake
- Horsehead Lake
- Long Lake
- Lake Oahe
- Rice Lake
- Rush Lake
- Lake Sakakawea (largest lake in North Dakota)
- Sweetwater Lake
- Lake Tschida
- Upper Harker Lake

=== Ohio ===
- Highlandtown Lake

=== Oklahoma ===
- Altus City Reservoir
- Lake Altus-Lugert
- American Horse Lake
- Lake of the Arbuckles
- Arcadia Lake
- Ardmore City Lake
- Atoka Lake
- Bellcow Lake
- Birch Lake
- Lake Bixhoma
- Black Kettle Lake
- Bluestem Lake
- Boomer Lake
- Broken Bow Lake
- Brushy Creek Reservoir
- Lake Burtschi
- Canton Lake
- Carl Albert Lake
- Carl Blackwell Lake
- Lake Carl Etling
- Lake Carlton
- Carter Lake
- Cedar Lake
- Chandler Lake
- Lake Checotah
- Lake Chickasha
- Chouteau Lock and Dam
- Claremore Lake
- Clayton Lake
- Clear Creek Lake
- Cleveland City Lake
- Clinton Lake
- Coalgate City Lake
- Comanche Lake
- Copan Lake
- Cordell Reservoir
- Crowder Lake
- Cushing Municipal Lake
- Lake Dahlgren
- Dripping Springs Lake
- Lake Durant
- Lake El Reno
- Lake Ellsworth
- Lake Eucha
- Foss Reservoir
- Fort Cobb Reservoir
- Fort Supply Lake
- Fuqua Lake
- Grand Lake o' the Cherokees
- Great Salt Plains Lake
- Greenleaf Lake
- Guthrie Lake
- Heyburn Lake
- Lake Hudson (formerly named Markham Ferry Reservoir)
- Hulah Lake
- Lake Jean Neustadt
- Lake Jed Johnson
- Kaw Lake
- Keystone Lake
- Konawa Reservoir
- Lake Lawtonka
- Liberty Lake
- Lloyd Church Lake
- McGee Creek Reservoir
- Lake McMurtry
- Mountain Lake
- Lake Murray
- Nanih Waiya Lake
- Oklahoma Lake
- Okmulgee Lake
- Oologah Lake
- Lake Overholser
- Ozzie Cobb Lake
- Pauls Valley Lake
- Pine Creek Lake
- Lake R.C. Longmire
- Raymond Gary Lake
- Robert S. Kerr Reservoir
- Rock Creek Reservoir
- Sardis Lake
- Shawnee Twin Lakes
- Skiatook Lake
- Sooner Lake
- Lake Spavinaw
- Sportsman Lake
- Lake Stanley Draper
- Lake Talequah
- Lake Tenkiller
- Lake Texoma (extends into Texas)
- Lake Thunderbird
- Tom Steed Reservoir
- W.D. Mayo Lock and Dam
- Lake W. R. Holway
- Waurika Lake
- Lake Wayne Wallace
- Webbers Falls Reservoir
- Wes Watkins Reservoir
- Wewoka Lake
- Lake Wister
- Lake Yahola

=== Pennsylvania ===
- Fairview Lake

=== South Carolina ===
- Alcohol and Drug Abuse Lake
- Lake Bowen
- Broadway Lake
- Lake Craig
- Lake Cunningham
- Lake Greenwood
- Lake Hartwell (extends into Georgia)
- Lake Jocassee
- Lake Keowee
- Lake Marion (largest lake in South Carolina)
- Lake Moultrie
- Lake Murray
- Lake Oak Grove
- Lake Oliphant
- Lake Ollenoy
- Lake Rabon
- Lake Robinson
- Lake Russell
- Saluda Lake
- Lake Secession
- Lake Strom Thurmond (also called Clarks Hill; extends into Georgia)
- Lake Thicketty
- Lake Tugalo (extends into Georgia)
- Lake Warren
- Lake Wateree
- Lake Welchel
- Lake Wylie

=== South Dakota ===
- Mutske Lake
- Piyas Lake
- Wigdale Lake

==== Former Lakes of South Dakota ====
- Simpson Lake (South Dakota)

=== Tennessee ===
- Lake Barkley (extends into Kentucky)
- Boone Lake
- Calderwood Lake
- Center Hill Lake
- Cherokee Lake
- Chickamauga Lake
- Chilhowee Lake
- Dale Hollow Reservoir
- Davy Crockett Lake
- Douglas Lake
- Fort Loudoun Lake
- Fort Patrick Henry Lake
- Lake Graham
- J. Percy Priest Lake
- Kentucky Lake (extends into Kentucky)
- Larry Collins Lake
- Melton Hill Lake
- Nickajack Lake
- Norris Lake
- Ocoee Lake
- Old Hickory Lake
- Reelfoot Lake
- Tellico Lake
- Tims Ford Lake
- Watauga Lake
- Watts Bar Lake (largest lake in Tennessee)
- Wilbur Lake (Tennessee)

=== Utah ===
- Bear Lake
- Blind Lake
- Blue Lake
- Lake Bonneville
- Cecret Lake
- Cliff Lake
- Crescent Lake
- Cuberant Lake
- Cuddyback Lake
- Cutthroat Lake
- Cyclone Lake
- Cys Cache
- Cyclone Lake
- Davis Lakes
- Dead Lake
- Deadman Lake
- Dean Lake
- Dog Lake (Brighton)
- Dog Lake (Mount Aire)
- Emerald Lake
- Fish Lake
- Great Salt Lake
- Jordan Lake
- Lake Powell, USBR (KTN+SS)
- Little Salt Lake
- Mirror Lake
- Navajo Lake
- Oowah Lake
- Rush Lake
- Sand Hollow Reservoir
- Sevier Lake
- Tony Grove Lake
- Utah Lake

=== Virginia ===
- Lovill's Creek Lake
- Smith Mountain Lake

=== Washington ===
- Blackmans Lake
- Fiander Lake
- Ipsoot Lake
- Kettling Lake
- Lamar Lake
- Lake Lucinda
- Lake Marcel
- Monogram Lake
- Ohop Lake
- Pitman Lake
- Setchfield Lake
- Sunwood Lake
- Waddell Lake

=== Wisconsin ===
- Potato Lake
- Two Sisters Lake

=== Wyoming ===
- Lake Alice
- Bradley Lake
- Emma Matilda Lake
- Flaming Gorge Reservoir (extends into Utah)
- Jackson Lake
- Jenny Lake
- Leigh Lake
- Phelps Lake
- Lake Solitude
- String Lake
- Taggart Lake
- Two Ocean Lake
- Yellowstone Lake (largest lake in Wyoming)

== Other areas ==
=== District of Columbia ===
- Kingman Lake is a tidal estuary, not a lake

=== Northern Mariana Islands ===
- Hagoi
- Lagona Lake

== See also ==
- List of lakes
- List of dams and reservoirs in the United States
