= List of lakes of Toole County, Montana =

There are at least 63 named lakes and reservoirs in Toole County, Montana.

== Lakes ==
- Alkali Lake, 48°56′10″N 111°25′57″W, el. 3,714 feet (1,132 m)
- Aloe Lake, 48°37′24″N 112°00′14″W, el. 3,274 feet (998 m)
- Benton Trail Lakes, 48°52′32″N 112°05′53″W, el. 4,065 feet (1,239 m)
- Big Lake, 48°56′18″N 111°28′01″W, el. 4,049 feet (1,234 m)
- Cameron Lake, 48°50′51″N 111°25′33″W, el. 4,055 feet (1,236 m)
- Cowboys Lake, 48°50′40″N 112°03′23″W, el. 4,193 feet (1,278 m)
- Davis Lakes, 48°52′53″N 112°04′23″W, el. 4,016 feet (1,224 m)
- Fey Lakes, 48°56′28″N 111°26′48″W, el. 3,894 feet (1,187 m)
- Fitzpatrick Lake, 48°53′38″N 112°10′06″W, el. 3,966 feet (1,209 m)
- Fitzpatrick Lake, 48°53′55″N 111°17′00″W, el. 3,976 feet (1,212 m)
- Foxtail Lakes, 48°52′00″N 112°05′48″W, el. 4,098 feet (1,249 m)
- Frenchman Lake, 48°51′33″N 112°03′18″W, el. 4,081 feet (1,244 m)
- Goedertz Lake, 48°44′53″N 111°58′15″W, el. 3,340 feet (1,020 m)
- Hemmings Lake, 48°54′30″N 112°02′05″W, el. 3,645 feet (1,111 m)
- Jones Lake, 48°59′13″N 111°28′00″W, el. 3,842 feet (1,171 m)
- Long Lake, 48°50′16″N 112°09′19″W, el. 4,091 feet (1,247 m)
- Mc Carters Lake, 48°31′10″N 111°24′14″W, el. 3,107 feet (947 m)
- Moltz Lake, 48°55′33″N 111°29′05″W, el. 4,183 feet (1,275 m)
- Mud Lake, 48°49′32″N 112°07′28″W, el. 4,114 feet (1,254 m)
- Perkins Lake, 48°54′56″N 111°41′52″W, el. 3,720 feet (1,130 m)
- Ruby Johnson Lake, 48°56′22″N 111°26′38″W, el. 3,871 feet (1,180 m)
- Swan Lake, 48°58′50″N 111°28′03″W, el. 3,862 feet (1,177 m)
- Twin Lakes, 48°55′38″N 111°27′33″W, el. 3,996 feet (1,218 m)
- Twin Lakes, 48°54′34″N 112°02′38″W, el. 3,661 feet (1,116 m)
- Verden Lake, 48°32′55″N 111°55′23″W, el. 3,264 feet (995 m)
- Virden Lake, 48°31′24″N 111°53′16″W, el. 3,278 feet (999 m)

== Reservoirs ==
- Alkali Lake, 48°56′00″N 111°25′45″W, el. 3,717 feet (1,133 m)
- Berkholder Reservoir, 48°42′55″N 111°17′22″W, el. 3,619 feet (1,103 m)
- Big Dam, 48°40′15″N 111°16′49″W, el. 3,497 feet (1,066 m)
- Big Lake, 48°56′06″N 111°27′57″W, el. 4,075 feet (1,242 m)
- Cameron Reservoir, 48°50′54″N 111°25′33″W, el. 4,094 feet (1,248 m)
- Childers Reservoir, 48°34′18″N 111°20′33″W, el. 3,297 feet (1,005 m)
- Childrers Reservoir, 48°34′25″N 111°20′42″W, el. 3,294 feet (1,004 m)
- Christian Lake, 48°56′30″N 111°19′57″W, el. 3,753 feet (1,144 m)
- Christian Reservoir, 48°56′30″N 111°19′59″W, el. 3,753 feet (1,144 m)
- Cook Reservoir, 48°59′08″N 111°19′11″W, el. 3,599 feet (1,097 m)
- D Ratzburg Reservoir, 48°15′36″N 111°35′21″W, el. 3,461 feet (1,055 m)
- Dunkirk Reservoir, 48°29′19″N 111°40′00″W, el. 3,255 feet (992 m)
- Ed McIntyre Reservoir, 48°27′48″N 111°58′39″W, el. 3,432 feet (1,046 m)
- Gillespie Reservoir, 48°27′15″N 111°17′24″W, el. 3,173 feet (967 m)
- Goeddertz Reservoir, 48°44′54″N 111°57′15″W, el. 3,330 feet (1,010 m)
- Grassy Lake, 48°58′45″N 112°00′43″W, el. 3,432 feet (1,046 m)
- Jim Judisch Reservoir, 48°18′54″N 111°37′45″W, el. 3,501 feet (1,067 m)
- Lake Shel-oole, 48°31′32″N 111°51′13″W, el. 3,340 feet (1,020 m)
- M Ratzburg Reservoir, 48°15′00″N 111°37′45″W, el. 3,465 feet (1,056 m)
- MacHale Reservoir, 48°48′00″N 111°24′03″W, el. 3,835 feet (1,169 m)
- Mary Reservoir, 48°43′06″N 111°22′03″W, el. 3,586 feet (1,093 m)
- McCarter Lake, 48°30′42″N 111°24′09″W, el. 3,097 feet (944 m)
- McIntyre Reservoir, 48°28′30″N 111°18′19″W, el. 3,202 feet (976 m)
- McLean Reservoir, 48°41′06″N 112°04′15″W, el. 3,386 feet (1,032 m)
- Melcott Reservoir, 48°29′29″N 111°43′38″W, el. 3,294 feet (1,004 m)
- Morris Reservoir, 48°48′30″N 111°19′15″W, el. 3,937 feet (1,200 m)
- Morris Reservoir, 48°53′00″N 111°17′39″W, el. 4,071 feet (1,241 m)
- Ovens Reservoir, 48°23′24″N 111°46′15″W, el. 3,084 feet (940 m)
- Parsell Lake, 48°50′42″N 111°26′03″W, el. 4,039 feet (1,231 m)
- Shay Reservoir, 48°31′00″N 111°26′39″W, el. 3,163 feet (964 m)
- Summers Reservoir, 48°29′38″N 111°46′57″W, el. 3,386 feet (1,032 m)
- Suphellen Reservoir, 48°44′30″N 111°40′21″W, el. 3,402 feet (1,037 m)
- The Pot Hole, 48°57′05″N 111°26′03″W, el. 3,743 feet (1,141 m)
- Wanken Reservoir, 48°27′12″N 111°57′27″W, el. 3,412 feet (1,040 m)
- Wilson Reservoir, 48°25′00″N 111°43′57″W, el. 3,333 feet (1,016 m)
- Wood Reservoir, 48°50′18″N 111°29′27″W, el. 3,573 feet (1,089 m)

== See also ==
- List of lakes in Montana
