= Mahla =

Mahla may refer to:

- Mahla (short film), a 2009 short film
- Mahla Lake, a lake in Douglas County, Minnesota, US
- Mahla Momenzadeh (born 2002), Iranian Taekwondo athlete
- Mahla Pearlman (1937–2011), Australian lawyer and chief judge of the Land and Environment Court of New South Wales
- Mahla Zamani, Iranian fashion designer
