= Cut-throat =

Cut-throat, or variants, may refer to:

== Animals ==
- Cutthroat eel, a family of eels
- Cut-throat finch, or cut throat, a common species of finch
- Cutthroat trout, a clade of four fish species
- Rose-breasted grosbeak, a bird known as cut-throat

== Arts and entertainment ==
=== Film and television ===
- The Cut-Throats, a 1969 film produced by John Hayes
- Cutthroats, 1994 film by Michael Legge
- The Challenge: Cutthroat, season 20 of the TV reality game show
- "Cut Throat", a season 4 episode of The Shield
- Cutthroat, a Transformers character

=== Gaming ===
- Cutthroat (pool), a three-player pocket billiards game
- Cutthroat: The Shadow Wars, a 1988 fantasy role-playing game
- Cutthroats (video game), a 1984 computer game
- Cutthroats: Terror on the High Seas, a 1999 real time strategy game

=== Literature ===
- Cutthroat (comics), the name of several Marvel Comics characters
- The Cutthroat, a 2017 novel in the Isaac Bell series by Clive Cussler
- The Cut Throat Trial, a 2025 legal thriller by the anonymous author "The Secret Barrister", writing as S. J. Fleet

=== Music ===
- The Cutthroats 9, a band
- Cutthroat (album), a 2025 album by Shame
- "Cutthroat" (song), a song by Imagine Dragons from the 2021 album Mercury – Act 1
- "Cut Throat", a song by Kittie from the 2009 album In the Black
- "Cut-Throat", a song by Sepultura from the 1996 album Roots
- "Cut Throat", a song by Death Grips from the 2011 mixtape Exmilitary
- Operation: Cut-Throat, a 2002 EP by Hidden in Plain View

== Other uses ==
- Denver Cutthroats, a minor league ice hockey team from Denver, Colorado

== See also ==
- Cutthroat bridge, a form of three-handed bridge
- Cut-throat Celts, a book in the Horrible Histories book series
- Cut Throat City, a 2020 film
- Cut throat competition, an anti-competitive practice
- Cutthroat Gap massacre, in 1833 massacre in the Wichita Mountains
- Cutthroat Island, a 1995 action film
- Cut Throat Island Air Station, in Newfoundland and Labrador, Canada
- Cutthroat Kitchen, an American TV cooking show
- Cutthroat Lake, in Utah, US
- Cut-throat razor, a reusable knife blade used for shaving hair
- Cutthroat Spades, a version of Spades (card game)
- Cain's Cutthroats, a 1971 western-themed exploitation film
- Castner's Cutthroats, the 1st Alaskan Combat Intelligence Platoon (Provisional) in World War II
- Kutthroat Bill: Vol. 1, a 2022 album by Kodak Black
- Murder
