= Wells Lake =

Wells Lake may refer to:

- Wells Lake (Minnesota), a lake in Rice County, Minnesota
- Wells Lake (politician), American farmer and politician from New York
