= Deadman Lake (Utah) =

Lake in the state of Utah, United States

- Location within Utah Location within the United States
- Location: Uintah County, Utah
- Coordinates: 40°46′19″N 109°54′40″W
- Type: Lake
- Surface elevation: 10,984 feet (3,348 m)

Deadman Lake is a lake near the northern edge of Uintah County, Utah, United States.

== Description ==
The lake, elevation 10,984 feet (3,348 m), is located in the Uintah Mountains within the Ashley National Forest at the western foot of Mount Untermann. A stream which flows west down the western face of Mount Untermann and Deadman Lake constitute the headwaters of Dry Fork (which flows in southeast and into Ashley Creek, at a point east of Steinaker Reservoir).

Deadman Lake was named in memory of a man who died of exposure at the lake while spending the winter there.

== See also ==
- List of lakes in Utah
