= Dean Lake (Duchesne County, Utah) =

Lake in the state of Utah, United States

- Location within Utah Location within the United States
- Location: High Uintas Wilderness, Duchesene County, Utah; United States
- Coordinates: 40.6785728°N 110.7615020°W
- Type: Lake
- Part of: Great Basin
- Basin countries: United States
- Surface elevation: 10,764 feet (3,281 m)

Dean Lake is a lake in the northwestern corner of Duchesne County, Utah, United States.

The lake is one of the four lakes located in the Four Lakes Basin within the High Uintas Wilderness in the Uinta-Wasatch-Cache National Forest. Dean Lake bears the name of Dean Clyde.

== See also ==
- List of lakes in Utah
