= Cuddyback Lake =

Lake in the state of Utah, United States

- Location within Utah
- Location: Garfield County, Utah
- Coordinates: 38°00′25″N 111°31′32″W
- Type: lake
- Surface elevation: 9,554 feet (2,912 m)

Cuddyback Lake is a lake in north-central Garfield County, Utah, United States.

== Description ==
The lake has an elevation of 9,554 feet (2,912 m) and is located within the Dixie National Forest, adjacent to a section of the Great Western Trail.

Cuddyback Lake bears the surname of an area rancher.

== See also ==
- List of lakes in Utah
