= Echo Lake (Clay County, Florida) =

- Interactive map of Echo Lake
- Location: Clay County, Florida
- Coordinates: 29.7383°N 82.0132°W
- Type: Freshwater
- Primary outflows: groundwater, evaporation
- Basin countries: United States
- Surface elevation: 85 ft (26 m)

Echo Lake is a freshwater lake located in western Clay County, Florida, situated immediately north of the Putnam County border, approximately 1.5 miles (2.4 km) northeast of the town of Melrose. It is situated within the North Florida region and is managed by the St. Johns River Water Management District (SJRWMD).

== Geography ==
Echo Lake is a karst lake within the Etonia Creek Basin, which drains toward the St. Johns River. Specifically, it is solution-depression lake perched on a karst landscape characterized by sandy soil, pine flatwoods, and high groundwater recharge. While technically within Clay County, the lake is frequently categorized alongside Putnam County water bodies in regional administrative documents due to its proximity to the county line and its connection to the Melrose-area watershed. Its surface elevation is approximately 85 feet (26 m) above sea level. It is one of several upland lakes in the Melrose area, including Lake Como to the south and Georges Lake to the northeast.

== Hydrology and ecology ==
The lake is primarily fed by direct precipitation and lateral seepage from the surficial aquifer. Because it lacks a major surface stream inflow, its water level is sensitive to regional rainfall patterns and groundwater fluctuations.

To protect the lake from ecological degradation, the SJRWMD has established "Minimum Flows and Levels." These regulatory thresholds are intended to protect the lake's biological resources (such as wading bird nesting sites and aquatic plant communities) from the impacts of significant groundwater withdrawals from the underlying Floridan aquifer.

For administrative and water-monitoring purposes, the Florida Department of Environmental Protection (FDEP) manages Echo Lake within the broader Lower St. Johns River Basin Management Action Plan (BMAP). It is classified as a Class III freshwater body.

Water quality data for Echo Lake is collected periodically through the University of Florida's LAKEWATCH program, which monitors nutrient levels to assess the lake's trophic status.

== History and management ==
In the 21st century, Echo Lake became a focus for regional water conservation efforts due to its status as a seepage lake. It was included in the SJRWMD regulatory framework to monitor groundwater drawdowns, ensuring that the surrounding private and agricultural wells do not permanently lower the lake's baseline level.

== Access and legal status ==
Echo Lake lacks public infrastructure, with no boat ramps, parks, or designated public entry points situated on its shores. Access to the lake is essentially limited to the owners of the private land parcels surrounding the shoreline.

The legal status of Echo Lake is governed by Florida law which classifies it as a non-meandered, non-navigable lake; therefore, it falls outside of the public trust doctrine with the lake bed being privately owned rather than state-held sovereignty land.

Furthermore, at 15 acres, Echo Lake meets the definition of a "small inland lake" under Florida Statute § 125.563, as it is a freshwater body essentially at rest and surrounded by land with a surface area of 150 acres or less. Because the shoreline is entirely composed of private residential parcels, there is no public right-of-way to the water. Under Florida law, the public may not trespass upon private property to gain access to such waters.

== See also ==
- Geography of Florida
- List of lakes in Florida
