= Dance Lake =

Lake in Polk County, Florida

- Location within Florida Location within the United States
- Location: Polk County, Florida
- Coordinates: 27.9287°N 81.6180°W
- Lake type: natural freshwater lake
- Basin countries: United States
- Max. length: 1,420 ft (433 m)
- Max. width: 1,380 ft (421 m)
- Surface area: 24.04 acres (10 ha)
- Surface elevation: 120 ft (37 m)

Dance Lake is not labelled on most maps, despite being as large as some neighboring lakes. It has a 24.04-acre (97,300 m^{2}) surface area and roughly resembles the shape of an oval, with a long cove at the south end of the lake. Dance Lake is just north of Lake Wales, Florida and just west of Mountain Lodge Lake. Connor road runs just beyond the houses along the southwest part of Dance Lake. Large parts of the lake's shore are bordered by citrus groves. Small wooded areas also border this lake.

This lake has no public access; the several boat ramps are privately owned. Also, there is no information about the types of fish in this lake.
