= Jordan Lake (Utah) =

Lake in the state of Utah, United States

- Location within Utah Location within the United States
- Location: High Uintas Wilderness, Duchesene County, Utah, United States
- Coordinates: 40.7047695°N 110.7973269°W
- Type: Lake
- Part of: Great Basin
- Basin countries: United States
- Surface elevation: 10,627 feet (3,239 m)

Jordan Lake is lake on the northern edge of Duchesne County, Utah, United States.

The lake is located in the Naturalist Basin, at the eastern foot of Mount Agassiz, within the High Uintas Wilderness in the Uinta-Wasatch-Cache National Forest. The lake was named for David Starr Jordan, a noted biologist, authority on fish, and a student of Louis Agassiz (for whom the nearby mountain was named).

== See also ==
- List of lakes in Utah
