= Crescent Lake (Utah) =

Lake in the state of Utah, United States

- Location within Utah Location within the United States
- Location: Cache County, Utah
- Coordinates: 41.9779331°N 111.6280034°W
- Type: Lake
- Surface elevation: 8,435 feet (2,571 m)

Crescent Lake is a lake in northeastern Cache County, Utah, United States.

== Description ==
The lake is located in the Bear River Range within the Uinta-Wasatch-Cache National Forest at an elevation of 8,435 feet (2,571 m)

Crescent Lake was so named on account of its outline being shaped like a crescent.

== See also ==
- List of lakes in Utah
