= Vernon Lake =

- Location within Louisiana Location within the United States
- Location: Vernon Parish, Louisiana, US
- Coordinates: 31°12′06″N 93°21′51″W
- Type: Reservoir
- Primary inflows: Anacoco Creek also called Anacoco Bayou
- Basin countries: United States
- Surface area: 1,700 ha (4,200 acres)
- Average depth: 7.0 m (23 ft)
- Max. depth: 16 m (53 ft)
- Shore length^{1}: 79 km (49 mi)
- ^{1} Shore length is not a well-defined measure.

Vernon Lake is a man-made lake in Vernon Parish, Louisiana. In 1963, Vernon Lake was created by the impounding of Anacoco Creek (Anacoco Bayou), creating a 4,200 acres (1,700 ha) lake for the purpose of water supply and recreation. The lake is 5 miles (8.0 km) west of Leesville, and 8 miles (13 km) north of Anacoco Lake.

== History ==
The Louisiana Legislature passed La. Act 277 of 1948 creating the Anacoco-Prairie State Game and Fish Preserve, setting aside 5,379 acres (2,177 ha) of land, money for the purchase of wild game and fish, and for restocking purposes, as well as for the building and maintenance of a dam. A second dam was authorized but no money provided. Construction was completed in 1951.

=== Lake authority ===
Act 858 of the 1981 Legislature abolished the Anacoco Prairie Game and Fish Commission and transferred authority to the Louisiana Department of Wildlife and Fisheries. The law provided for a panel of citizens to be appointed to an advisory board. The Vernon Parish Police Jury established the Vernon Parish Game and Fish Commission composed of nine members that including two members of the jury.

=== Ownership and maintenance ===
The State of Louisiana owns the land under the lake and the Louisiana Department of Wildlife & Fisheries (LDWF) manages the fish and wildlife resources. The dam is one of twenty under the authority of the Louisiana Department of Transportation and Development for maintenance over the levees, dam, and associated structures. The Vernon Parish Police Jury created the Vernon Parish Game and Fish Commission and appoints an eleven-member advisory panel.

== Infrastructure ==
The earthen dam is approximately 4,911 feet (1,497 m) in length with a 16 feet (4.9 m) crown 257 feet (78 m) mean sea level (MSL). The embankment is constructed of a homogeneous earth fill with stone rip-rap shore protection with a maximum height of approximately 43 feet.

=== Dam issues ===
Vernon Lake was lowered after Tropical Storm Harvey went through the area, causing damage to the dam. Repairs could take a year and a lower lake level will be maintained until then.

==== Dam repairs ====
The dam operates with a double gate system. One gate was damaged, as well as the overflow slides on both sides. Work was initiated in 2017.

The timeline for completion was estimated by the DOTD to be early summer of 2019.

Finding parts was hard. In 2019 a contract was awarded and material staging began. Construction was finally completed November 29, 2023.

== Mercury advisory ==
In 1997 a fish consumption advisory was issued for Vernon Lake by the Environmental Protection Agency. On May 23, 2003, a fish consumption advisory was issued, and an advisory was also issued in 2009

The cause is attributed to high levels of Mercury, or methylmercury, that can lead to Mercury poisoning. Elevated levels of mercury that exceeds 0.5 parts per million (ppm) have shown to be more dangerous to developing fetuses, infants, and children but prolonged bio-accumulation, over an average of 1.0 ppm, can cause nerve and kidney damage to anyone. Unacceptable levels of Mercury were reported in Large-mouth bass, Flathead catfish, Redear sunfish, and Bluegill (Bream) sunfish.
