= Dead Lake (Uintah County, Utah) =

Lake in Uintah County, Utah, United States

- Location within Utah Location within the United States
- Location: Uintah County, Utah
- Coordinates: 40.6725853°N 109.9132139°W
- Type: Lake
- Surface elevation: 10,065 feet (3,068 m)

Dead Lake is a lake in the Uinta Mountains in the northwestern corner of Uintah County, Utah, United States.

== Description ==
The lake is located in Paradise Park (flat) in the Ashley National Forest, with an elevation of 10,065 feet (3,068 m), just east of the Paradise Park Reservoir.

Dead Lake is seemingly devoid of life, hence the name.

== See also ==
- List of lakes in Utah
