= Threemile Pond =

Lake in Maine, United States

- Location within Maine
- Location: China and Windsor, Maine United States
- Coordinates: 44°22′05″N 69°36′21″W
- Etymology: For being inaccurately measured as three miles long
- Primary inflows: Unnamed brook
- Primary outflows: Barton Brook
- Max. length: 2.71 mi (4.36 km)
- Max. width: 1.11 mi (1.79 km)
- Surface area: 1,174 acres (4.75 km^{2})
- Average depth: 17 ft (5.2 m)
- Max. depth: 37 ft (11 m)
- Surface elevation: 177 ft (54 m)
- Max. temperature: 75 °F (24 °C)
- Min. temperature: 64 °F (18 °C)
- Islands: 2 islands

Threemile Pond is a lake located in Windsor and China, Maine. Despite the name, the pond is in fact 2.71 miles long. The lake has a boat ramp for aquatic activities . The lake has 4 small islands named Camp Island, Marsh Island, Shallow Island, and Overlook Island. South Vassalboro is located less than half a mile away from the lake. Three of the lake's Islands are private, and one is an undeveloped marsh.

== See also ==
- List of lakes of Maine
