= Cyclone Lake =

Lake in Garfield County, Utah

- Location within Utah
- Location: Garfield County, Utah
- Coordinates: 37.9832344°N 111.7190193°W
- Type: lake
- Surface elevation: 9,869 feet (3,008 m)

Cyclone Lake is a lake in Garfield County, Utah, United States. The lake is about 15 miles (24 km) north-northwest of Escalante and is located within the Dixie National Forest with an elevation of 9,869 feet (3,008 m).

Cyclone Lake was so named on account of the lake having been visited by a tornado (cyclone).
