= Lake Lucas =

Lake in the state of Florida, United States

- Location within Florida Location within the United States
- Location: Highlands County, Florida
- Coordinates: 27°30′44″N 81°25′20″W
- Type: natural freshwater lake
- Basin countries: United States
- Max. length: 865 ft (264 m)
- Max. width: 665 ft (203 m)
- Surface area: 9.4 acres (3.8 ha)
- Surface elevation: 98 ft (30 m)
- Settlements: Sebring, Florida,

Lake Lucas is a natural freshwater lake in Highlands County, Florida to the north of Sebring.

The lake has a surface area of 9.4-acre (38,000 m^{2}). It is bordered on the north by Maranatha Village retirement community, to the east by a swampy area, to the southeast by Lakeside Cemetery, by a residential area to the south and west, and by pastureland to the northwest. The lake has no boat ramps or swimming areas.
