= Davis Lakes =

Group of lakes near the northern edge of Duchesne County, Utah, United States

Coordinates: 40°48′46″N 110°13′20″W

- Location within Utah
- Location: Near the northern edge of Duchesne County, Utah, United States
- Type: Alpine lakes
- Primary inflows: Uinta River
- Basin countries: United States
- Surface elevation: 11,020 ft (3,360 m)

Davis Lakes is a group of lakes near the northern edge of Duchesne County, Utah, United States.

== Description ==
The lakes are in the High Uintas Wilderness within the Ashley National Forest at the headwaters of the Uinta River at an elevation of 11,020 feet (3,360 m).

Davis Lakes were named for Bob Davis, an early guide in the area and was the first to stock fish in the lakes.

== See also ==
- List of lakes in Utah
