= Fadden Lake =

Lake in the state of Minnesota, United States

- Location within Minnesota
- Location: Sibley County, Minnesota
- Coordinates: 44°40′45″N 94°10′4″W
- Type: lake

Fadden Lake is a lake in Sibley County, in the U.S. state of Minnesota.

Fadden Lake bears the name of James Fadden, a pioneer who settled at the lake in 1869.

== See also ==
- List of lakes in Minnesota
