= Pabor Lake =

- Location within Florida Location within the United States
- Location: Polk County, Florida and Highlands County, Florida
- Coordinates: 27.6478°N 81.5187°W
- Type: lake
- Surface elevation: 98 feet (30 m)

Pabor Lake is north of the city of Avon Park, Florida. It is a natural, round forty acre lake. About eighty-five percent of the lake is in Polk County, Florida. The remainder of the lake is in Highlands County, Florida. The lake is found at an elevation of 98 feet (30 m).

Pabor Lake is a public lake accessible from Lake Pabor Drive, which winds around the lake's north and east sides.
