= Talcot Lake =

Lake in the state of Minnesota, United States

- Location within Minnesota
- Location: Cottonwood and Murray County, Minnesota
- Coordinates: 43°52′41″N 95°27′10″W
- Type: lake

Talcot Lake is a lake in the U.S. state of Minnesota. The lake was named for Andrew Talcott, a surveyor.
