= Padgett Lake =

- Location within Florida Location within the United States
- Location: Lake Wales, Florida
- Coordinates: 27.9240°N 81.6095°W
- Type: natural freshwater lake
- Basin countries: United States
- Max. length: 900 feet (270 m)
- Max. width: 890 feet (270 m)
- Surface area: 15.94 acres (6 ha)
- Surface elevation: 125 feet (38 m)

Padgett Lake is a natural freshwater lake of irregular shape on the north side of Lake Wales, Florida. It has a 15.94-acre (64,500 m^{2}) surface area. Most of the shore of this lake is a bit swampy 5 feet (1.5 m) to 10 feet (3.0 m) out into the water. Much of the shore is bordered by woods. On the northeast corner is a motel and on the southwest corner is a former motel that has been converted to apartments. A bit south of the lake and to the west of the former motel runs Mountain Lake Cutoff Road.

There is no public access to this lake. However, the Hook and Bullet website says River Lake contains largemouth bass, bluegill and crappie.
