= Rat Root Lake =

Lake in the state of Minnesota, United States

- Location within Minnesota
- Location: Koochiching County, Minnesota
- Coordinates: 48°30′9″N 93°16′44″W
- Type: lake

Rat Root Lake is a lake in Koochiching County, in the U.S. state of Minnesota.

Rat Root Lake was named for the roots eaten by muskrats.

== See also ==
- List of lakes in Minnesota
