= Lake Reed =

- Location within Florida Location within the United States
- Location: Winter Haven, Florida
- Coordinates: 27.9607°N 81.6837°W
- Type: natural freshwater lake
- Basin countries: United States
- Max. length: 600 feet (180 m)
- Max. width: 600 feet (180 m)
- Surface area: 16.91 acres (7 ha)
- Surface elevation: 131 feet (40 m)

Lake Reed is a lake located in southern Winter Haven, Florida.

== Features ==
Lake Reed has a surface area of 16.91 acres (68,432 m^{2}). The lake's shore is marshland. It is bordered to the north and northeast by Eloise Loop Road, and on the west by pastures, and on the southeast and south by the gated Terranova residential community.

There is no public access to this lake, as it is fenced along Eloise Loop Road.

The lake is inhabited by largemouth bass, bluegill and crappie.
