= Lost Grove Lake =

Reservoir in Iowa, United States

- Location within Iowa Location within the United States
- Location: Scott County, Iowa, US
- Coordinates: 41.681494°N 90.474703°W
- Type: reservoir
- Primary inflows: Lost Creek
- Primary outflows: Lost Creek
- Catchment area: Upper Mississippi River
- Basin countries: United States
- Surface area: 400 acres (160 ha)
- Max. depth: 50 ft (15 m)

Lost Grove Lake is an artificial lake in Scott County, Iowa.

== History ==
Construction on the main ramp began in mid to late June 2014.
