= Waboose Lake =

Lake in the state of Minnesota, United States

- Location within Minnesota
- Location: Hubbard County, Minnesota
- Coordinates: 47°3′27″N 94°49′32″W
- Type: lake

Waboose Lake is a lake in Hubbard County, in the U.S. state of Minnesota.

Waboose is a name derived from an Ojibwe language word meaning "rabbit".

== See also ==
- List of lakes in Minnesota
