= Silver Lake (Highlands County, Florida) =

Lake in the state of Florida, United States

- Location within Florida
- Location: Highlands County, Florida
- Coordinates: 27°34′00″N 81°31′24″W
- Type: lake
- Surface area: 22-acre (89,000 m^{2})
- Surface elevation: 135 ft (41 m)

Silver Lake is a 22-acre (89,000 m^{2}) circular lake southwest of Avon Park, Florida. It is on the west end of Bill Sachsenmeier Memorial Road. The only access is within the Reflection on Silver Lake retirement mobile home and RV park. There is no public access to the lake. It has a private fishing dock but no boat dock. The lake's shore is inaccessible due to the tall grass surrounding the entire lake.
