= Sunset Lake (Orlando, Florida) =

Lake in the state of Florida, United States

- Location within Florida Location within the United States
- Location: Orlando, Florida
- Coordinates: 28°32′11″N 81°24′41″W
- Type: natural freshwater lake
- Basin countries: United States
- Max. length: 1,660 feet (510 m)
- Max. width: 1,240 feet (380 m)
- Surface area: 28.76 acres (11.64 ha)r
- Surface elevation: 98 feet (30 m)
- Islands: numerous islets along the shore

Sunset Lake, sometimes called Lake Sunset, is a 28.76-acre (116,400 m^{2}) freshwater lake located in west central Orlando, Florida, United States. This teardrop-shaped lake is surrounded by a residential area. John Young Parkway borders the lake on part of its west side.

Fishing is a popular activity. There are no public swimming areas on the shore of this lake, nor any public boat docks on the lake. One public park, Gilbert McQueen Park, is on the lake's southeast side. This park has only one sidewalk, which does not border Sunset Lake. The Take Me Fishing website provides no information on what types of fish are in this lake.
