= Lake Easy =

- Location within Florida Location within the United States
- Location: Polk County, Florida
- Coordinates: 27.8586°N 81.5609°W
- Type: natural freshwater lake
- Basin countries: United States
- Max. length: 4,209 feet (1,283 m)
- Max. width: 3,600 feet (1,100 m)
- Surface area: 407 acres (165 ha)
- Average depth: 12.3 feet (3.7 m)
- Max. depth: 30.7 feet (9.4 m)
- Water volume: approximate volume 2,202,648,497 U.S. gallons (8.33793158×10^{9} L)
- Surface elevation: 112 feet (34 m)
- Islands: sometimes one when the water level is low
- Settlements: Highland Park, Florida

Lake Easy is a natural freshwater lake with a 407-acre (1,650,000 m^{2}) surface area. The lake is somewhat oval in shape and sometimes has a small island in its southeast part, depending on the lake level at the time. Lake Easy is bounded on its north by the incorporated village of Highland Park, which is also a golf resort. On its west side is grassland and a residential development. To the southwest are a citrus orchard and pastureland. On the southeast is residential housing along Lake Easy Road. Along its east side is public land.

Lake Easy has no public swimming area. It has a public boat ramp on the east side. The lake contains black drum, bigmouth buffalo and atlantic salmon.
