= Skataas Lake =

Lake in the state of Minnesota, United States

- Location within Minnesota
- Location: Kandiyohi County, Minnesota
- Coordinates: 45°10′11″N 95°1′46″W
- Type: lake

Skataas Lake is a lake in Kandiyohi County, in the U.S. state of Minnesota. Skataas Lake bears the name of an early settler.

The climate is hemiboreal.

== See also ==
- List of lakes in Minnesota
