= Little Elbow Lake =

Lake in the state of Minnesota, United States

- Location within Minnesota
- Location: Mahnomen County, Minnesota
- Coordinates: 47°10′56″N 95°36′13″W
- Type: lake

Little Elbow Lake is a lake in Mahnomen County, in the U.S. state of Minnesota.

Little Elbow Lake was so named on account of its outline being bent like an elbow.

== See also ==
- List of lakes in Minnesota
