= Rutz Lake =

Lake in the state of Minnesota, United States

- Location within Minnesota
- Location: Carver County, Minnesota
- Coordinates: 44°52′16″N 93°51′34″W
- Type: lake

Rutz Lake is a lake in Carver County, Minnesota, in the United States.

Rutz Lake was named for Peter Rutz, an early settler.
