= Pilcher Pond =

- Location within Georgia
- Location: McIntosh County, Georgia
- Coordinates: 31°28′47″N 81°35′44″W
- Type: lake
- Basin countries: United States
- Surface elevation: 30 ft (9 m)

Pilcher Pond is a lake in the U.S. state of Georgia.

Pilcher Pond was named after Samuel Pilcher, a pioneer citizen.
