= Warren Lake =

Lake in the state of Minnesota, United States

- Location within Minnesota
- Location: Mahnomen County, Minnesota
- Coordinates: 47°23′23″N 95°51′49″W
- Type: lake

Warren Lake is a lake in Mahnomen County, in the U.S. state of Minnesota.

Warren Lake was named for Budd Warren, the nephew of William Whipple Warren, an historian, interpreter, and legislator in the Minnesota Territory.
