= Whalon Lake =

- Location within Illinois Location within the United States
- Location: Royce Road, west of Route 53/Bolingbrook Drive in Bolingbrook, Illinois
- Coordinates: 41°42′58″N 88°05′35″W
- Type: Reservoir
- Basin countries: United States
- Surface area: 81 acres (33 ha)
- Average depth: 15 ft (4.6 m)
- Shore length^{1}: 1.5 mi (2.4 km)
- Surface elevation: 640 ft (200 m)
- Islands: 2
- ^{1} Shore length is not a well-defined measure.

Whalon Lake was once a quarry and is now a lake open to the public. Located in Bolingbrook, Illinois, it offers many activities like fishing, kayaking, walking, and biking. The lake is currently owned and operated by the Forest Preserve District of Will County.

Located among wetlands near the DuPage River, the lake covers an area of about 81 acres (33 ha), has an average depth of 15 ft (4.6 m), and a shoreline length of 1.5 mi (2.4 km). The preserve occupies 266 acres (108 ha).

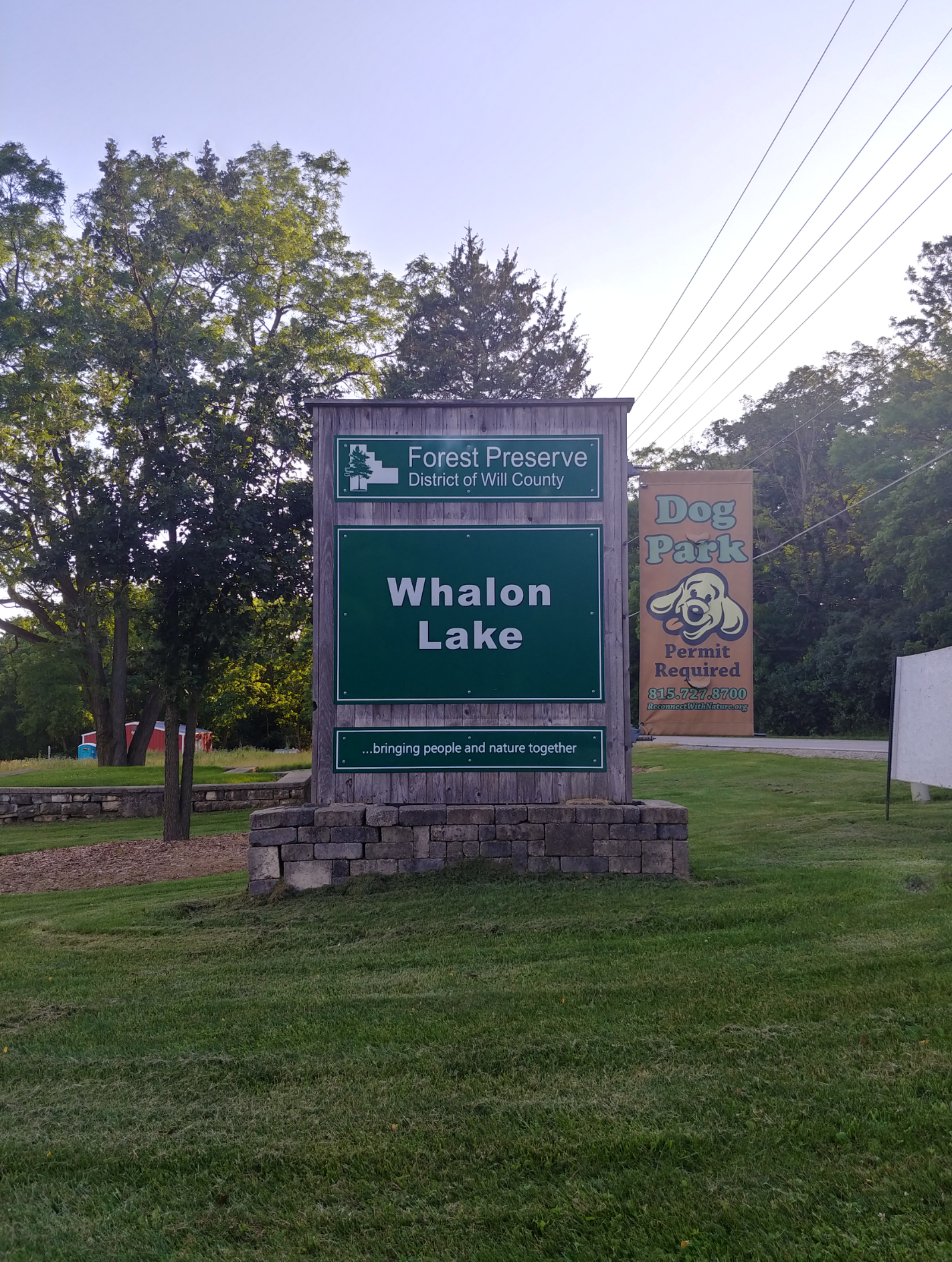
Whalon Lake Main Entrance Sign

== History ==
This site was surface-mined by Elmhurst-Chicago Stone for sand, gravel and limestone for nearly 50 years.

The property was purchased in the 1990s by the Forest Preserve District of Will County. Following the completion of a site development project, the lake was allowed to fully impound.

In 2004, plans were made to construct a dog park at Whalon Lake. By 2006, the dog park was open to the public; it comprises 8 acres (3.2 ha), with 2.5 acres (1.0 ha) set aside for small dogs. At that time the forest preserve, still under construction, was expected to be "one of Will County's biggest gems".

Whalon Lake used to be a quarry and after being converted to a lake, it has been open to the public since 2008.

The lake is a part of The Forest Preserve District of Will County which owns and manages land in 70 forest preserves, including 10 designated as Illinois Nature Preserves for their rare natural features. The Whalon Lake property was purchased through voter supported referendums. Prior to the impoundment of Whalon Lake, three large overflow pipes with which the quarry was fitted were specified to contain valves to prevent the ingress of fish from the nearby DuPage River, although this was never completed.

== Features ==
The shoreline length is approximately 1.5 miles (2.4 km), excluding the two islands located in the southeast portion of the impoundment. Includes both natural and man-made habitats. The entire shoreline is accessible to bank fishing and a barrier-free fishing pier facilitates access for anglers with special needs.

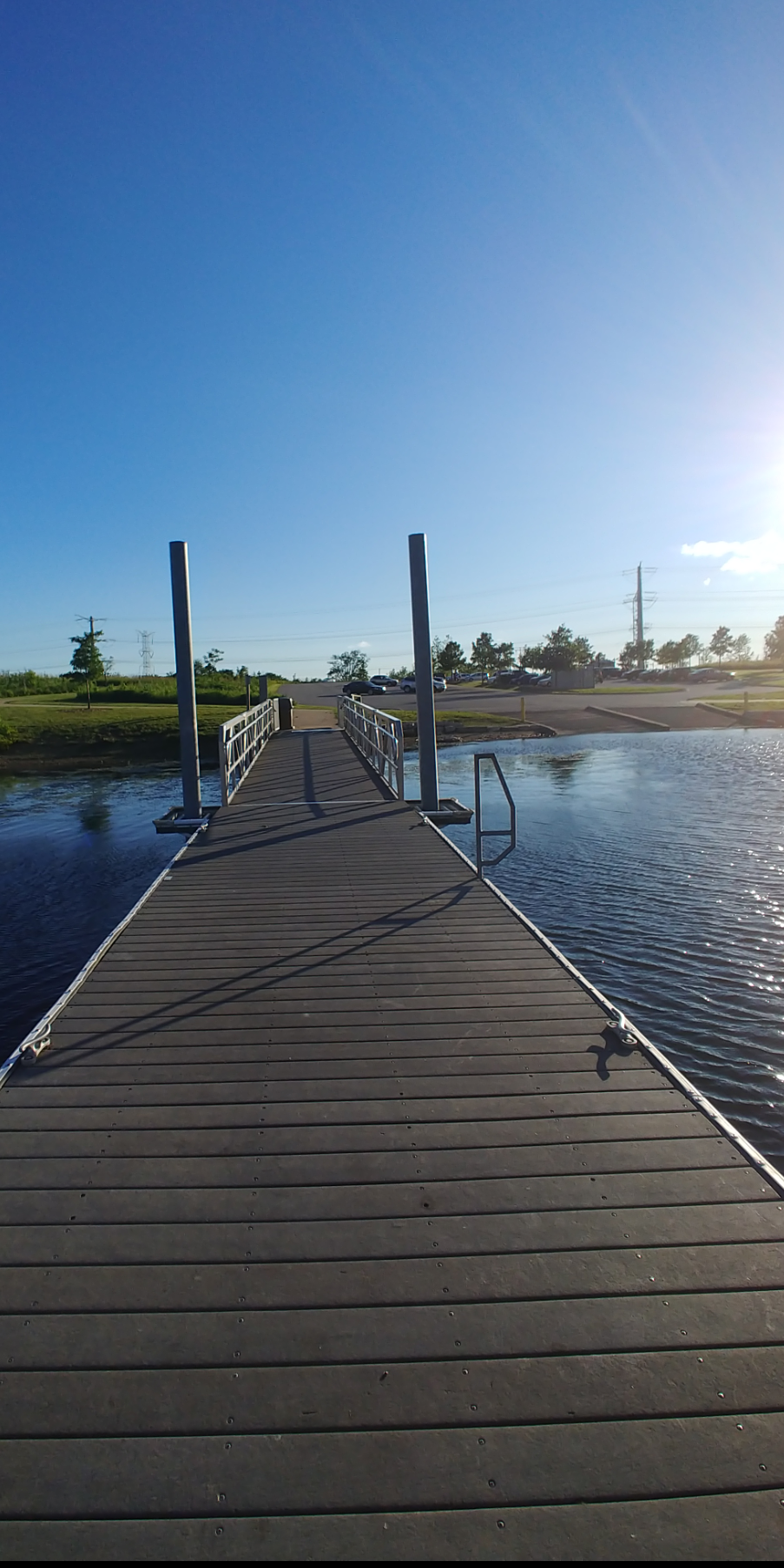
Dock (center) and boat ramp (right)

Whalon Lake has a two-lane concrete boat ramp and boats are restricted to utilizing electric trolling motors only

Whalon Lake amenities
Activity	Is it allowed/available?
Boat fishing	Electric boat motor only
Boat ramp	Yes
Boat rental	Yes
Skiing	No
Swimming	No
Camping	No

=== Trails ===
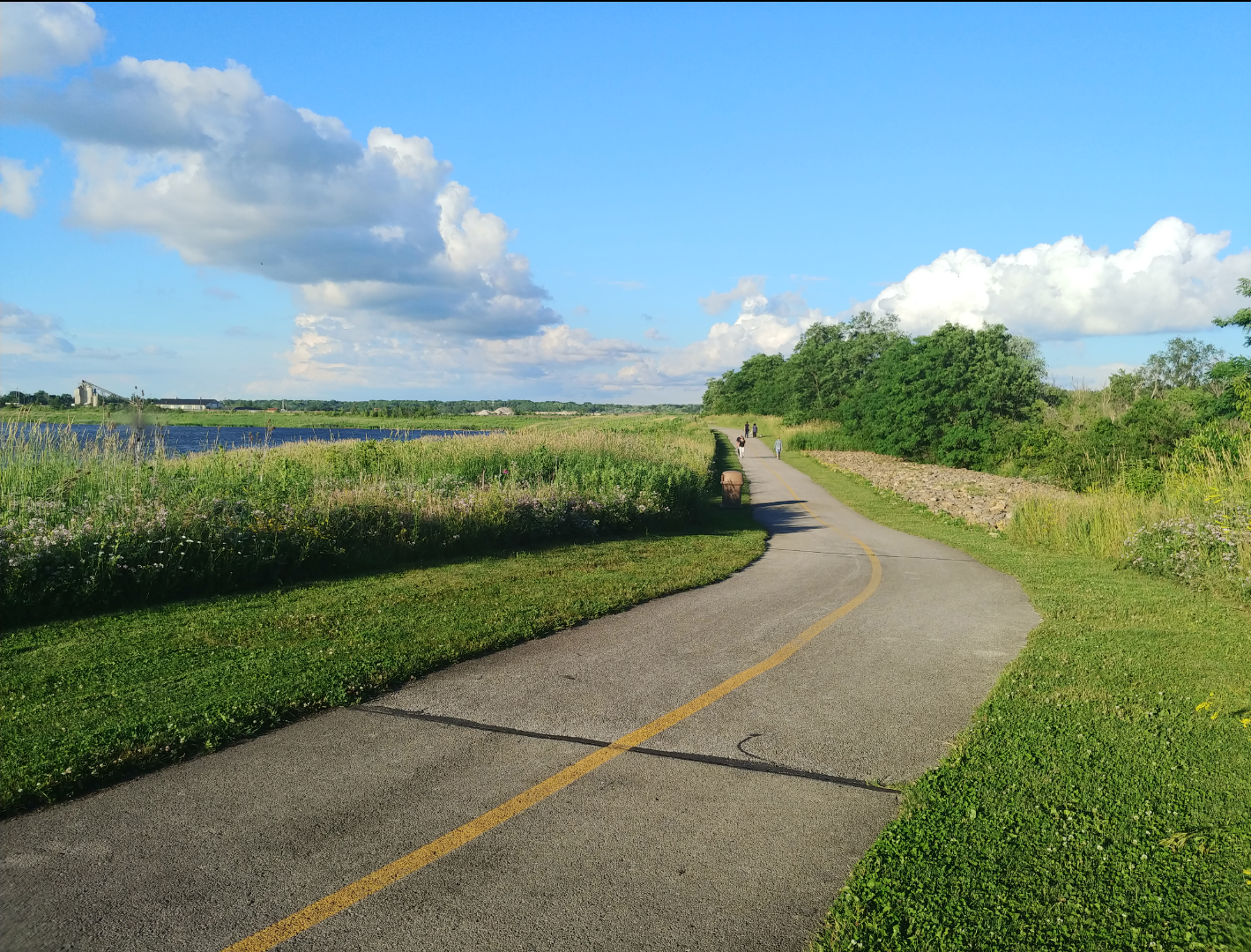
Paved trail around the perimeter of Whalon Lake

Whalon Lake provides access to a 3.71 miles (5.97 km) paved path that is in the northern part of the Dupage River Trail. The trail offers uses such as biking, walking, running, cross country skiing, snowshoeing and in line skating.

=== Lake activities ===
==== Fishing ====
The lake offers a variety of fish species including largemouth bass, smallmouth bass, bluegill, redear sunfish, channel catfish and walleye.

The majority of the lake's shoreline is angler-accessible. A fishing pier is available on the east side of the lake, and the fishery is cooperatively managed by the Illinois Department of Natural Resources (IDNR) and the Forest Preserve District of Will County.

===== Fishing limits =====
Illinois fishing regulation
Species	Limit
All fish species	3 fish daily creel limit

Illinois fishing regulation by species
Fish species	Limit per day	Minimum size
Largemouth bass	1	18" or larger
Smallmouth bass	1	18" or larger
Bluegill	15	N/A
Redear sunfish	15	N/A
Channel catfish	3	N/A
Walleye	3	16" or larger
