= Round Pond (Connecticut) =

- Location within Connecticut Location within the United States
- Location: Fairfield County, Connecticut
- Coordinates: 41°18′13″N 73°32′12″W
- Type: pond

Round Pond is located in Ridgefield, Connecticut, United States. Formed by a receding glacier, it is public and is 32 acres (130,000 m^{2}) in size. The pond drains across the state boundary to the state of New York into the Cross River Reservoir, providing an initial flow to New York City. Once used as a reservoir for city water for Ridgefield, the spring-fed aqueduct is no longer used for that purpose. The pond gets an average of 4.44 inches (113 mm) of precipitation per month, and is at an elevation of 797 feet (243 m) above sea level. A fishing ban enacted in the mid-19th century stands today, and the pond is no longer available for fishing.
