= Park Lake (Orlando, Florida) =

Lake in the state of Florida, United States

- Location within Florida Location within the United States
- Location: Orlando, Florida
- Coordinates: 28°33′15″N 81°22′21″W
- Basin countries: United States
- Max. length: 910 feet (280 m)
- Max. width: 810 feet (250 m)
- Surface area: 8.8 acres (4 ha)
- Surface elevation: 84 feet (26 m)
- Settlements: Orlando, Florida

Park Lake is an almost round 8.8-acre (36,000 m^{2}) freshwater lake located within Orlando, Florida. This lake is in a residential area.

Fishing, walking and using the playground at Park Lake Park are available activities. Neither swimming or boating are allowed. Sidewalks along streets traverse about three-fourths of Park Lake. Colonial Drive, one of the major roads running through Orlando, passes along the lake's south side. Park Lake Park is on the west side of the lake. A fountain is in the middle of the lake. Park Lake Presbyterian Church is on the lake's southwest corner.
