= Lake Weaver =

Lake in the state of Florida, United States

Lake Weaver or Lake Weader
- Location within Florida Location within the United States
- Location: Polk County, Florida
- Coordinates: 27.9022°N 81.5979°W
- Type: natural freshwater lake
- Basin countries: United States
- Max. length: 1,075 ft (328 m)
- Max. width: 875 ft (267 m)
- Surface area: 14.46 acres (6 ha)
- Surface elevation: 115 ft (35 m)
- Settlements: Lake Wales, Florida

Lake Weaver is a natural freshwater lake located in Lake Wales, Florida. The lake is also much of the time called Lake Weader. By looking at maps and websites, it appears both names are used as often as the other. The lake is on the north side of Central Avenue and just east of US Highway 27. Across the street on Central are businesses and to the lake's southeast are businesses. On the northeast shore is a residential area. To the north is a wooded area.

For a number of years the lake had a fountain in it. A small park is at its southwest corner. Boating and swimming are not allowed. The public may access the lake shore along its entire south shore and southeast shore, so Lake Weaver can be fished. The Hook and Bullet website says the lake contains blue catfish, bullhead and gar.
