= Lake Sirena =

Lake in the state of Florida, United States

- Location within Florida Location within the United States
- Location: south side of Lake Placid, Florida
- Coordinates: 27°17′08″N 81°22′10″W
- Type: natural freshwater lake
- Basin countries: United States
- Max. length: 2,315 ft (706 m)
- Max. width: 1,595 ft (486 m)
- Surface area: 142.85 acres (58 ha)
- Max. depth: 58 ft (18 m)
- Surface elevation: 85 ft (26 m)

Lake Sirena, an oval-shaped lake, has a surface area of 142.85-acre (578,100 m^{2}). It is on the south side of Lake Placid, Florida. In fact, it is surrounded by the city, but most of its shore and most of the lake is outside the city limits. Only a small sliver of the south end of the lake is inside the city of Lake Placid. Part of the west shore and most of the north shore and all the east shore are surrounded by residences. On the northwest and southwest are citrus groves. The southeast shore is bordered by vacant land. A small part of the northwest is also bordered by vacant land.

Lake Sirena only has public access at the public boat access point on its north shore, at Lake Drive West. This is merely a sandy place along the road where only small boats can be launched. A canal also connects this lake to Lake Pearl, to the east, but the canal cannot be navigated; it runs through a small culvert at one point. The lake can be fished from shore along the boat area. There are no public swimming beaches at Lake Sirena. The Take Me Fishing website says Lake Sirena contains largemouth bass, bluegill and grass carp.
