= Stinking Lake (New Mexico) =

- Burford Lake
- Location within New Mexico
- Location: Rio Arriba County, New Mexico
- Coordinates: 36°37′21.5″N 106°52′0.9″W
- Type: lake

Stinking Lake (also known as Burford Lake) is a lake in Rio Arriba County, New Mexico, in the United States.

The name of the lake is likely borrowed from the Tewa language name P’oe Sųųˀi or P’oekwîn Sųųˀi, meaning the same.
