= Picard Lakes =

Group of lakes in the state of Minnesota, United States

Coordinates: 47°9′10″N 95°12′55″W

Picard Lakes is a group of lakes in Clearwater County, Minnesota, in the United States.

Picard Lakes were named for Antoine Auguelle Picard du Gay, a French explorer.

== See also ==
- List of lakes in Minnesota
