= Lake Gross =

Lake in Florida

- Location within Florida Location within the United States
- Location: Winter Haven, Florida
- Coordinates: 27.9636°N 81.6920°W
- Type: natural freshwater lake
- Basin countries: United States
- Max. length: 2,390 feet (730 m)
- Max. width: 1,720 feet (520 m)
- Surface area: 86.57 acres (35 ha)
- Surface elevation: 135 feet (41 m)

Lake Gross is an oval-shaped lake. The Polk County Water Atlas says it is sometimes known as Lake Grassy or Lake Grass, but no other sources have used these names. Lake Gross is a natural freshwater lake with an 86.57-acre (350,300 m^{2}) surface area. It is about 2,000 feet (610 m) southeast of Lake Eloise and about 1,200 feet (370 m) southwest of Lake Winterset. This lake is on the south fringe of Winter Haven, Florida. On the north Lake Gross is bordered by a small mobile home/RV park and on the west it is bordered by another such park, although this one is much larger. On the northeast, east and south, Lake Gross is bordered by pasture. About 200 feet (61 m) north of the lake is Eloise Loop Road.

There is no public access to Lake Gross, as its shores nowhere border public property. It has only private boat docks and no swimming areas. Although there is nowhere for the fishing public to access the lake, the Hook and Bullet website says Lake Gross contains largemouth bass, bluegill and crappie.
