= Lake Maude =

- Location within Florida Location within the United States
- Location: Winter Haven, Florida
- Coordinates: 28.0397°N 81.7212°W
- Type: natural freshwater lake
- Basin countries: United States
- Max. length: 2,065 feet (629 m)
- Max. width: 1,455 feet (443 m)
- Surface area: 54.83 acres (22.19 ha)
- Surface elevation: 141 feet (43 m)

Lake Maude is an oval-shaped lake on the north side of Winter Haven, Florida. It has a surface area of 54.83-acre (221,900 m^{2}). On its north and west sides, Lake Maude is bordered by residential areas. On its entire east side is Lake Maude Nature Park and on the south Lake Maude is bordered by Avenue O Northeast.

Lake Maude allows for much public access. A public boat ramp is on the south shore, just off Avenue O Northeast. The Lake Maude Nature Park is located along the entire east shore of the lake. The nature park has a paved walking trail, 0.9 miles (1.4 km) long, picnic facilities, a playground, two public fishing piers and a nature observation deck. This lake does not have a public swimming area, however. The Hook and Bullet website says Lake Maude contains largemouth bass, bluegill and crappie.
