= Snow Water Lake =

- Location within Nevada
- Location: Elko County, Nevada
- Coordinates: 40°47′15″N 114°57′47″W
- Type: lake

Snow Water Lake is a lake in the U.S. state of Nevada.

When it's not completely dry, Snow Water Lake is filled by melting snow, hence the name.
