= Toners Lake =

Lake in the state of Minnesota, United States

- Location within Minnesota
- Location: Waseca County, Minnesota
- Coordinates: 44°9′55″N 93°35′58″W
- Type: lake

Toners Lake, located in Waseca County, U.S. state of Minnesota, was named after Richard Toner, a blacksmith who was among the early settlers in the area. The lake spans approximately 134 acres and is part of the county’s notable natural features, with historical and recreational importance to the community.
