= Bankston Lake =

- Tama Lake
- Location within Georgia Location within the United States
- Location: Georgia, USA
- Coordinates: 32°45′23″N 83°41′49″W
- Etymology: R.E. Bankston
- Surface elevation: 95 m (312 ft)

Bankston Lake is a lake in the U.S. state of Georgia.

The lake was named after R.E. Bankston, original owner of the site. A variant name was "Tama Lake".
