= Sager Lake =

Lake in the state of Minnesota, United States

- Location within Minnesota
- Location: Martin County, Minnesota
- Coordinates: 43°35′40″N 94°22′54″W
- Type: lake

Sager Lake is a lake in Martin County, in the U.S. state of Minnesota.

Sager Lake bears the name of an early settler.
