= Lake McCoy =

Lake in the state of Florida, United States

- Location within Florida Location within the United States
- Location: south side of Lake Placid, Florida
- Coordinates: 27°17′03″N 81°21′14″W
- Type: natural freshwater lake
- Basin countries: United States
- Max. length: 1,850 feet (560 m)
- Max. width: 1,650 feet (500 m)
- Surface area: 50.83 acres (21 ha)
- Average depth: 22 feet (6.7 m)
- Max. depth: 61 feet (19 m)
- Surface elevation: 92 feet (28 m)

Lake McCoy is almost round, except for an indentation along the east shore. On the south side of the city of Lake Placid, Florida, it has a surface area of 50.83-acre (205,700 m^{2}). On the south, east, north and northwest, the lake is surrounded by residences along McCoy Drive. On the west Lake McCoy is bordered by U.S. Route 27.

Lake Mccoy only has public access along the public right of way along US 27. There are no public boat ramps or no public swimming areas. No information is available about the types of fish in this lake.
