= Vanose Lake =

Lake in the state of Minnesota, United States

- Vanoss Lake
- Location within Minnesota
- Location: Mahnomen County, Minnesota
- Coordinates: 47°24.5′N 95°48.5′W
- Type: lake

Vanose Lake (also spelled Vanoss Lake) is a lake in Mahnomen County, in the U.S. state of Minnesota.

The lake was named for Francis Vanoss, an early settler.

== See also ==
- List of lakes in Minnesota
