= Lake Ina =

- Location within Florida Location within the United States
- Location: Polk County, Florida
- Coordinates: 28.0034°N 81.6990°W
- Type: natural freshwater lake
- Basin countries: United States
- Max. length: 1,000 ft (305 m)
- Max. width: 435 ft (133 m)
- Surface area: 8.99 acres (4 ha)
- Surface elevation: 128 ft (39 m)
- Settlements: Winter Haven, Florida

Lake Ina is about 1,000 ft (305 m) east of Lake Roy. Lake Ina is inside the city of Winter Haven, Florida, and is bordered by Cypress Garden Boulevard on its north. In fact, a bridge carries this street over the extreme northern edge of the lake. Lake Ina has a 8.99-acre (36,400 m^{2}) surface area. The lake is irregularly shaped and is bordered by residences from its northeast side to its southwest side. Vacant grassland borders the rest of the west side.

Lake Ina has no public swimming area or boat ramp. There is public access along the west and northwest shore area. The Fishing Works website has one user who submitted a rating; that user rated the fishing there as fair. The Hook and Bullet website says Lake Ina contains sturgeon, crappie, and bowfin.
