= Pay Lake =

Lake in the state of Minnesota, United States

- Location within Minnesota
- Location: Kandiyohi County, Minnesota
- Coordinates: 45°9′4″N 94°47′17″W
- Type: lake

Pay Lake is a lake in Kandiyohi County, in the U.S. state of Minnesota.

Pay Lake Pay was named from the fact a railroad paymaster settled there.

== See also ==
- List of lakes in Minnesota
