= Kettling Lake =

- Location within Washington (state) Location within the United States
- Location: North Cascades National Park, Chelan County, Washington, United States
- Coordinates: 48°26′55″N 120°43′55″W
- Lake type: Alpine lake
- Primary outflows: Kettling Creek
- Basin countries: United States
- Max. length: 300 yd (270 m)
- Max. width: 200 yd (180 m)
- Surface elevation: 5,381 ft (1,640 m)

Kettling Lake is located in North Cascades National Park, in the U. S. state of Washington. The lake is not accessible via any designated trails but is only about 1 mi (1.6 km) south of the Pacific Crest Trail and the Twisp Pass Trail junction.

== Ecology ==
Kettling Lake lies within the Bridge Creek watershed, part of the Stehekin River drainage system. The lake has a surface area of approximately 4 hectares (9.9 acres) and a maximum depth of 7 metres (23 ft). It is classified as an oligotrophic lake, characterised by cold, clear, highly oxygenated water with low concentrations of dissolved minerals. The surrounding vegetation includes Pacific silver fir, mountain hemlock, Engelmann spruce and subalpine fir. Approximately 60% of the shoreline is bordered by narrow strips of marshy meadow.
