= Twin Pond =

- Location of Twin Pond within New York
- Location: Herkimer County, New York
- Coordinates: 43°42′30″N 74°56′33″W
- Type: Lake
- Basin countries: United States
- Surface area: 32 acres (13 ha)
- Surface elevation: 1,709 ft (521 m)
- Islands: 1
- Settlements: Old Forge

Twin Pond is a small lake east of Old Forge in Herkimer County, New York. It drains north via an unnamed creek which flows into First Lake.

== See also ==
- List of lakes in New York
