= Luxton Lake =

Lake in Sullivan County, New York, United States

- Location within New York Location within the United States
- Location: Sullivan County, New York
- Coordinates: 41°35′37″N 75°00′44″W
- Basin countries: United States
- Surface area: 3 acres (1.2 ha)
- Surface elevation: 906 ft (276 m)

Luxton Lake, previously known as Lucky Lake, is located 2 hours from New York City in Narrowsburg, New York. The development was a popular vacation spot for African American New Yorkers in the 1950s and 1960s.

GNIS reports the lake is 3 acres (1.2 ha) and at an elevation of 906 feet (276 m).
