= Malmedal Lake =

Lake in the state of Minnesota, United States

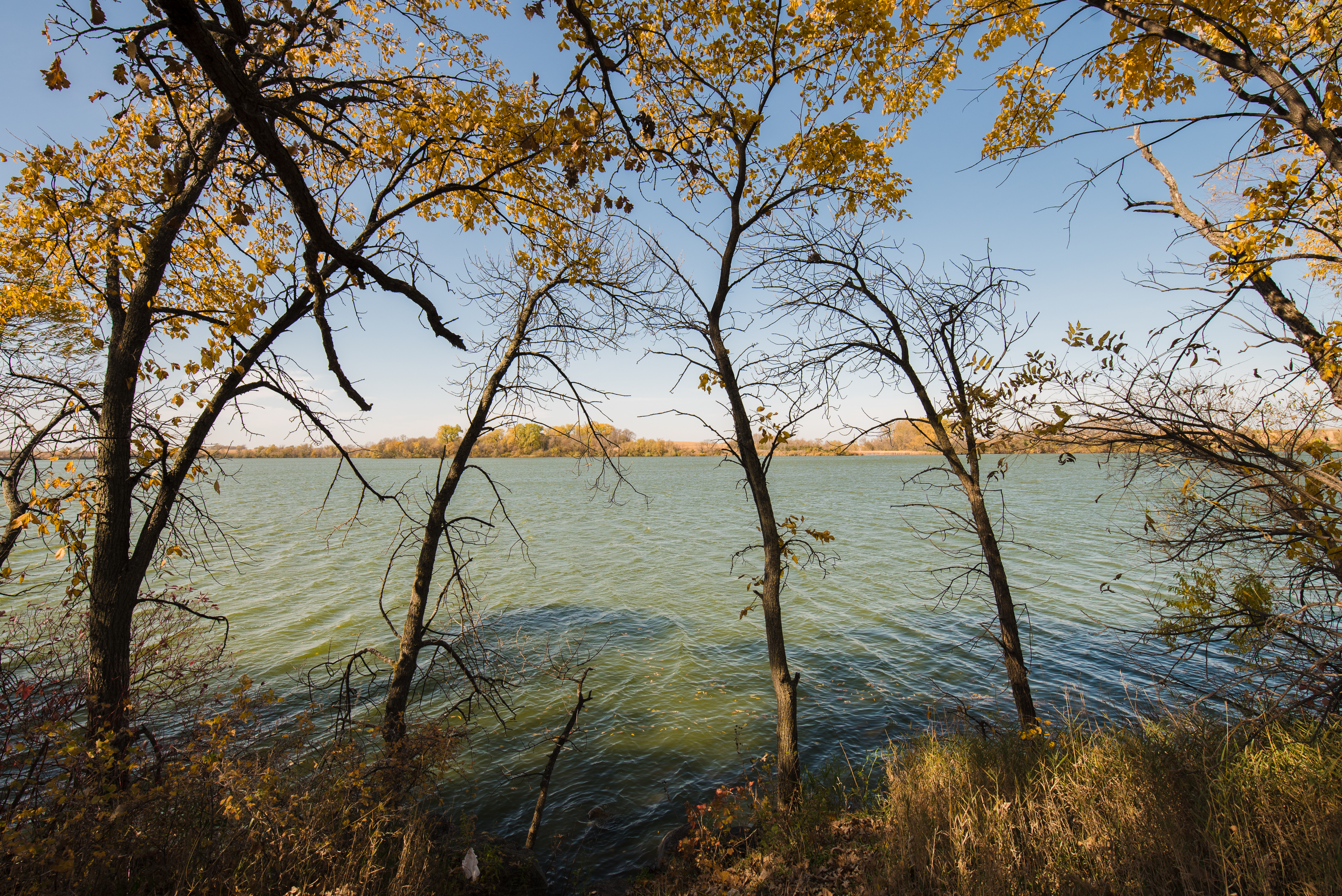

- Location within Minnesota
- Location: Pope County, Minnesota
- Coordinates: 45°40′17″N 95°31′57″W
- Type: lake

Malmedal Lake is a lake in Pope County, in the U.S. state of Minnesota.

Malmedal Lake was named for Christian Malmedard, a Norwegian settler.

== See also ==
- List of lakes in Minnesota
