= Kinman Pond =

Lake in California, United States

- Location within California Location within the United States
- Location: Humboldt County, California
- Coordinates: 40°27′38″N 124°12′24″W

Kinman Pond is a lake in Humboldt County, California, in the United States.

Kinman Pond (previously Kinmans Pond) was named for Seth Kinman, a pioneer settler.

== See also ==
- List of lakes in California
