= Taylors Lake =

- Location within Georgia
- Location: Bartow County, Georgia
- Coordinates: 34.15315°N 84.98795°W
- Type: reservoir

Taylors Lake is a reservoir in Bartow County, in the U.S. state of Georgia.

Taylors Lake was named in honor of Glen Taylor.
