= Ogishkemuncie Lake =

Lake in the state of Minnesota, United States

- Location within Minnesota
- Location: Lake County, Minnesota
- Coordinates: 48°5.5′N 91°4′W
- Type: lakes

Ogishkemuncie Lake is a lake in Lake County, in the U.S. state of Minnesota.

The name Ogishkemuncie is derived from the Ojibwe word ogiishkimanisii, meaning "kingfisher".

== See also ==
- List of lakes in Minnesota
