= Schutz Lake =

Lake in the state of Minnesota, United States

- Location within Minnesota
- Location: Carver County, Minnesota
- Coordinates: 44°52′33″N 93°38′46″W
- Type: lake

Schutz Lake is a lake in Carver County, Minnesota, in the United States.

Schutz Lake was named for Matthias Schutz, a pioneer who settled near this lake.
