= Sugar Bush Lake =

Lake in the state of Minnesota, United States

- Location within Minnesota
- Location: Mahnomen County, Minnesota
- Coordinates: 47°28′19″N 95°40′13″W
- Type: lake

Sugar Bush Lake is a lake in Mahnomen County, in the U.S. state of Minnesota.

Sugar Bush Lake was named for the sugar maple trees near the lake.

== See also ==
- List of lakes in Minnesota
