= Court Lake =

Lake in North Dakota, United States

- Location within North Dakota
- Location: Benson County, North Dakota
- Coordinates: 47°59′38″N 98°54′55″W
- Type: lake
- Basin countries: United States
- Surface elevation: 1,447 ft (441 m)

Court Lake is in Benson County, North Dakota, in the United States.

Court Lake bears the name of Ignatius Court, a Native American translator.
