= Lake Marcel =

- Location within Washington (state)
- Location: King County, Washington, United States
- Coordinates: 47°41′38″N 121°54′54″W Lake; 47°41′35″N 121°55′4″W Dam and reservoir 47°41′40″N 121°55′16″W Populated place; 47°41′33″N 121°54′54″W Census Designated Place
- Type: lake, reservoir
- Primary inflows: Stillwater Creek
- Primary outflows: Stillwater Creek
- Catchment area: 1,290 acres (520 ha)
- Basin countries: United States
- Surface area: 33 acres (13 ha)
- Max. depth: 17 ft (5.2 m)
- Surface elevation: 295 ft (90 m)
- Settlements: Carnation

Lake Marcel is a private reservoir and community in unincorporated Carnation, Lake Marcel-Stillwater, King County, Washington, United States, in the foothills of the Cascades.

Lake Marcel has a surface area of 33 acres (130,000 m^{2}) and a watershed of 1,290 acres (5.2 km^{2}). It has a maximum depth of 17 feet (5.2 m).

Lake Marcel is at an altitude of 295 feet (90 m) above sea level. The lake sits in a bowl at the top of Stillwater Hill on the east side of the Snoqualmie Valley, north of Carnation. It has two main areas of water connected by a channel, and several peninsular features make an extensive shoreline around the lake.

== Watershed ==
According to the Lake Marcel Community Club, there are "six identifiable inlet streams flowing into the lake; the largest one, Stillwater Creek, originates about 1.5 miles to the north." Lake Marcel is drained solely by Stillwater Creek, named for the historic community downstream at the base of Stillwater Hill. Near Stillwater, the creek briefly joins Harris Creek before meeting the Snoqualmie River in an area protected by the 456-acre (1.85 km^{2}) Stillwater Wildlife Area, owned by the Washington State Department of Fish and Wildlife. The 44-acre (180,000 m^{2}) Stillwater Natural Area, owned by King County, is adjacent. The portion of Stillwater Creek below Lake Marcel is also labeled as Essency Creek on some maps and government databases.

Lake Marcel is the third largest lake by surface area in Carnation, after Lake Joy with 105 acres (0.42 km^{2}) and Lake Langlois with 39 acres (160,000 m^{2}). However, Lake Marcel has the largest watershed of the three lakes, far exceeding Lake Joy at 468 acres (1.89 km^{2}) and Lake Langlois at 226 acres (0.91 km^{2}).

== History ==
Originally a beaver pond, the lake and surrounding acreage was residentially developed in the early 1960s by Pyramid Investment Company of Bellevue, Washington. An island at the north end of the lake was formed by bulldozing during the excavation of the lake.

During construction, one of the principal builders -Marcel Hos- was injured and subsequently died from his injuries. He was buried in the cemetery in Carnation, and the lake was named for him.

A concrete-lined fish ladder for the inflow from Stillwater Creek was built around 1963. An earthen dam was completed in 1964.

=== Community growth ===
In 1985, Duvall-King County Fire District #45 built the Lake Marcel Fire Station, now a vehicle station for King County Water District #119.

In 1989, Riverview School District #407 opened Stillwater Elementary School—named after the historic Stillwater School—close to Lake Marcel. It is the district's only public school in an unincorporated area.

== Dam ==
A concrete dam engineered by the United States Army Corps of Engineers was built in the 1980s by the Lake Marcel Community Club (LMCC) to replace the earthen dam.

The Lake Marcel Dam is regulated by the Washington State Department of Ecology and is privately owned by members of the LMCC. It is the only dam in Carnation, according to the Inventory of Dams in the State of Washington.

The Lake Marcel Dam is 24 feet (7.3 m) high and 100 feet (30 m) long. It is capable of storing 350 acre-feet (430,000 m^{3}) in Lake Marcel and can discharge 1,300 cubic feet (37 m^{3}) per second.

=== Comparison to other dams in the area ===
The Loutsis Dam in Duvall is 22 feet (6.7 m) high and 395 feet (120 m) long. It can store 138 acre-feet (170,000 m^{3}) in Loutsis Lake and can discharge 97 cubic feet (2.7 m^{3}) per second.

The Lake Margaret Dam in Duvall is 39 feet (12 m) high and 480 feet (150 m) long. It can store 1,200 acre-feet (1,500,000 m^{3}) in Lake Margaret and can discharge 900 cubic feet (25 m^{3}) per second.

== Population ==
The Lake Marcel-Stillwater census-designated place (CDP) represents the immediate area around Lake Marcel. It is the only CDP between Carnation and Duvall.

The Lake Marcel-Stillwater CDP is similar in size to Carnation and Fall City, both in the Snoqualmie Valley. In 2000, the Lake Marcel-Stillwater CDP had a population of 1,381 over 1.3 square miles (3.4 km^{2}). Fall City had a population of 1,638 over 1.3 square miles (3.4 km^{2}). Carnation had 1,893 over 1.1 square miles (2.8 km^{2}).

== Homeowners Association ==
The Lake Marcel Community Club enforces regulations on the properties within its area of Plat and Dedication recognized by King County. LMCC maintains the dam, fish ladder, and 2 private beaches.
