= Beck Lakes =

Lake in the state of California, United States

- Location within California
- Location: Madera County, California
- Coordinates: 37°38′14″N 119°09′25″W
- Type: Lake
- Managing agency: United States Forest Service
- Surface elevation: 9,810 feet (2,990 m)

Beck Lakes are twin lakes in Madera County, California, in the United States.

Beck Lakes were named for John Beck, a mine owner.

== See also ==
- List of lakes in California
