= Schilling Lake =

Lake in the state of Minnesota, United States

- Location within Minnesota
- Location: Sibley County, Minnesota
- Coordinates: 44°41′48″N 94°12′50″W
- Type: lake

Schilling Lake is a lake in Sibley County, in the U.S. state of Minnesota.

Schilling Lake was named for John Schilling, a pioneer settler.
