= Tyson Lake =

Lake in the state of Minnesota, United States

- Location within Minnesota
- Location: Yellow Medicine County, Minnesota
- Coordinates: 44°36′50″N 95°31′47″W
- Type: lake

Tyson Lake is a lake in Yellow Medicine County, in the U.S. state of Minnesota.

Tyson Lake was named for Joseph Tyson, a pioneer who settled there.
