= Tower Lakes (Polk County, Florida) =

- Location within Florida Location within the United States
- Location: Polk County, Florida
- Coordinates: 27.9304°N 81.6046°W
- Type: excavated manmade freshwater lakes
- Basin countries: United States
- Max. length: 1,000 ft (300 m)
- Max. width: 280 ft (85 m)
- Surface area: 4.1 acres (2 ha)
- Surface elevation: 131 ft (40 m)
- Settlements: Tower Lakes Adult Mobile Home Community

Tower Lakes can be considered either one or two lakes, since they consist of a north and a south lake joined by a narrow water passage. Tower Lakes is a landscaping feature of the Tower Lakes Adult Mobile Home Community, just north of Lake Wales, Florida. The mobile home park is just east of US Highway 27; the only park entrance can only be accessed from the highway. This mobile home park, for residents fifty-five years and older, contains approximately 500 mobile homes and about 1000 residents during the peak season for winter visitors (December through March). The community has a large clubhouse on the east side of Tower Lakes just south of where the two parts are joined. The water has a 4.1-acre (17,000 m^{2}) surface area. The north lake has almost twice the surface area of the south lake. The north lake is shaped like a backwards small "y" and the south lake is shaped like a capital "R." The two lakes are joined at the center of the bottom of the "y" and the top of the "R."

No boating, fishing or swimming are allowed at Tower Lakes, but during daytime hours the public may enter the mobile home park to see Tower Lakes. The lake area has a wooden footbridge going over the channel that connects the two parts. Just to the north of the bridge a fountain is just inside the lake. Park benches are placed at various locations on the lake shore.
