= White Lily Lake =

Lake in the state of Minnesota, United States

- Location within Minnesota
- Location: Kanabec County, Minnesota
- Coordinates: 46°5′13″N 93°6′7″W
- Type: lake

White Lily Lake is a lake in Kanabec County, in the U.S. state of Minnesota.

White Lily Lake was named for the white water lilies found there.

== See also ==
- List of lakes in Minnesota
