= Shamineau Lake =

Lake in the state of Minnesota, United States

- Location within Minnesota
- Location: Morrison County, Minnesota
- Coordinates: 46°15′16″N 94°36′17″W
- Type: lake

Shamineau Lake is a lake in Morrison County, in the U.S. state of Minnesota.

Shamineau (or Shamano) was the name of a local Native American (Indian).

== See also ==
- List of lakes in Minnesota
