= Lake Bill Waller =

Lake in Mississippi, United States

- Location within Mississippi Location within the United States
- Location: Marion County, Mississippi
- Coordinates: 31°11′29″N 89°43′12″W
- Basin countries: United States
- Surface area: 168 acres (68 ha)
- Surface elevation: 226 ft (69 m)

Lake Bill Waller is a 168-acre man-made lake, named for former Governor of Mississippi Bill Waller. It is located in Marion County, Mississippi, seven miles southeast of Columbia, and is primarily used for angling.

== History ==
In 1995, Lake Bill Waller produced the second-largest largemouth bass (15 lb. 14 oz.) ever caught in the state. It closed in 2003 and reopened in 2007 following draining, renovation and restocking with game fish.

== Management ==
Lake Bill Waller is continually monitored by Mississippi biologists to maintain the production of trophy and eating-sized fish, with a catch and release focus. Manager Tim Barber described their efforts:

All the bass 18 inches or longer must be released back into the lake. We also encourage anglers to keep 15 bass, 18-inches and under, per person per day. Some of the fish less than 18 inches weigh from 2 1/2 to 3 pounds each, which are really good eating-size bass. We encourage our fishermen to catch and eat these bass to keep the lake in balance.
