= Lot Pond =

- Location within Georgia
- Location: Lowndes County, Georgia
- Coordinates: 30°39′32″N 83°14′10″W
- Type: lake
- Basin countries: United States
- Surface area: 22 acres (8.9 ha)
- Surface elevation: 112 ft (34 m)

Lot Pond is a lake in Lowndes County, Georgia, located four miles southwest of Lake Park at an elevation of 112 feet (34 m) above mean sea-level. The lake is approximately 22 acres (8.9 ha) in size.

A former variant name was "Horselot Pond". Peat was once mined at Lot Pond.
