= Wita Lake =

Lake in the state of Minnesota, United States

- Location within Minnesota
- Location: Blue Earth County, Minnesota
- Coordinates: 44°13′36″N 93°54′12″W
- Type: lake

Wita Lake is a lake in Blue Earth County, Minnesota, in the United States.

Wita Lake was named from a Sioux-language word meaning "Island Lake", for its two lake islands.
