= Valkaria Lake =

Body of water in Florida, USA

- Location within Florida Location within the United States
- Location: Brevard County, Florida
- Coordinates: 27.9557278°N 80.6161598°W
- Type: man made non reservoir freshwater lake
- Basin countries: United States
- Max. length: 1,075 ft (328 m)
- Max. width: 1,050 ft (320 m)
- Surface area: 21.22 acres (8.59 ha)
- Surface elevation: 23 ft (7.0 m)
- Islands: 2 islets
- Settlements: Grant-Valkaria, Florida

Valkaria Lake is a small man made lake in Brevard County, Florida. This lake has no park areas or public swimming beaches. It is surrounded by a residential area.
