= Potato Lake (Rusk County, Wisconsin) =

Lake located in the northwestern part of Wisconsin

- Location within Wisconsin Location within the United States
- Location: Rusk County, Wisconsin, United States
- Coordinates: 45.3298°N 91.415944°W
- Basin countries: United States
- Surface area: 534 acres (2 km^{2})
- Max. depth: 40 ft (12 m)

Potato Lake is a lake located in the northwestern part of Wisconsin. It is in the far southwestern corner of Rusk County, approximately 12 miles east of Chetek, Wisconsin. Potato Lake is one of Rusk County's 88 named lakes, and can be accessed by a ramped public boat landing. It is a drainage lake that is connected to McDermott Creek and Potato Creek. Potato Creek eventually flows into the Chippewa River.

== Fishing ==
Anglers enjoy Potato Lake's offerings, especially those wanting to catch the Wisconsin muskellunge, also known as the musky. The musky is highly prized, so much so, that in 1955 it was officially named the state fish of Wisconsin. The Wisconsin Department of Natural Resources has named Potato Lake as one of the state's class A1 musky waters, which means that the lake may harbor trophy-sized muskellunge. The minimum length requirement for a legally caught musky on Potato Lake is 40 inches.

Other fish in Potato Lake include panfish such as bluegill, crappies, pumpkinseed sunfish, and perch; and game fish such as largemouth bass, smallmouth bass, northern pike, and walleye. If anglers are fishing for walleye on Potato Lake, they must abide by the Ceded Territory bag limit of 3 walleye per licensed fisherman rather than the 5 walleye bag limit on non-Ceded Territory lakes.
