= Blackmans Lake =

Blackman Lake
- Stillaguamish
- Location within Washington (state)
- Location: Snohomish County, Washington
- Coordinates: 47°55′56″N 122°05′38″W
- Type: lake
- Basin countries: United States
- Surface elevation: 144 ft (44 m)

Blackman Lake is a lake in the U.S. state of Washington.

Blackman Lake (originally Stillaguamish Lake) was renamed after the Blackman Brothers, sawmill operators who set up their first logging operation on the northeast shore of the lake. In 1884 the Blackman Brothers opened their first sawmill on the Snohomish River, employing 10 men; in 1887 the mill burned down under suspicious circumstances, but it was quickly rebuilt and by 1889 the mill employed 175 men. The Blackman Mill was the only mill in the area during this time that was able to produce more lumber than could be sold locally; so when rail service reached Snohomish in 1889, the Blackmans were the first to begin exporting red cedar shingles nationwide.

== See also ==
- List of lakes in Washington
