= Narragansett Pond =

- Location within Massachusetts Location within the United States
- Location: Plymouth County, Massachusetts
- Coordinates: 41.9299°N 70.7352°W
- Type: lake
- Basin countries: United States

Narragansett Pond is a lake in Plymouth County, Massachusetts.

Narragansett Pond was so named in commemoration of an Indian battle near the pond in which many Narragansett people warriors died.
