= Monker Lake =

Lake in the state of Minnesota, United States

- Location within Minnesota
- Location: Cook County, Minnesota
- Coordinates: 47°48′8″N 90°22′11″W
- Type: lake

Monker Lake is a lake in Cook County, Minnesota, in the United States.

Monker Lake was named for Claus C. Monker, a Norwegian who settled there.

== See also ==
- List of lakes in Minnesota
