= Rat House Lake =

Lake in the state of Minnesota, United States

- Location within Minnesota
- Location: Aitkin County, Minnesota
- Coordinates: 46°52′2″N 93°13′31″W
- Type: lake

Rat House Lake is a lake in Aitkin County, Minnesota, in the United States.

Rat House Lake was named from the presence of muskrats.

== See also ==
- List of lakes in Minnesota
