= White Stone Lake =

Lake in the state of Minnesota, United States

- Location within Minnesota
- Location: Chisago County, Minnesota
- Coordinates: 45°20′44″N 92°56′8″W
- Type: lake

White Stone Lake is a lake in Chisago County, Minnesota, in the United States.

White Stone Lake was named from the white stones, large and small, found on its lake bed.

== See also ==
- List of lakes in Minnesota
