= Lamar Lake =

Lake in Stevens County, Washington, United States

- Location within Washington (state) Location within the United States
- Location: Stevens County, Washington
- Coordinates: 48°53′43″N 118°06′22″W
- Basin countries: United States
- Surface elevation: 3,117 ft (950 m)

Lamar Lake is a lake in the U.S. state of Washington. The elevation of the lake is 3117 feet.
