= Cys Cache =

Lake in the state of Utah, United States

- Location within Utah
- Location: Beaver County, Utah
- Coordinates: 38.2536684°N 112.4705498°W
- Type: lake
- Surface elevation: 7,923 feet (2,415 m)

Cys Cache is a lake in Beaver County, Utah, United States. The lake is about 9.8 miles (15.8 km) east-southeast of Beaver and is located within the Fishlake National Forest with an elevation of 7,923 feet (2,415 m).

Cys Cache derives its name from Cyrus Davis, a wildlife official who planted fish in the lake.
