= Lake Angelo =

Lake in the state of Florida, United States

- Location within Florida
- Location: Highlands County, Florida
- Coordinates: 27.586°N 81.467°W
- Type: freshwater lake
- Surface area: 55.73-acre (225,500 m^{2})

Lake Angelo is a round natural freshwater lake in Highlands County, Florida, located 0.5 miles (0.80 km) east of Avon Park, Florida.

Lake Angelo has a surface area of 55.73-acre (225,500 m^{2}). On the south the lake is bounded by woods and grassland. Angelo Lake Road starts beyond the woods at State Highway 17 and travels almost halfway around the lake, taking off to the north at the lake's northeast edge. Sears Road is on the north and Lake Angelo Drive is on the west. Houses and private boat docks line the lake along these two roads.

There is no public access to the lake, since the areas not lined with houses are fenced off from the roads. Therefore, no public fishing, boating or swimming are allowed.
