= Counterfeit Lake =

Lake in the state of Florida, United States

- Location within Florida Location within the United States
- Location: Highlands County, Florida
- Coordinates: 27.5734°N 81.4570°W
- Lake type: natural freshwater lake
- Basin countries: United States
- Max. length: 0.25 miles (0.40 km)
- Max. width: 0.25 miles (0.40 km)
- Surface area: 18 acres (7 ha)
- Surface elevation: 98 ft (30 m)

Counterfeit Lake is a circular, natural freshwater lake in Highlands County, Florida. Much of the time, the lake is more of a swamp, rather than a lake. It is about 0.2 miles (0.32 km) north of the south branch of Lake Letta Road, which itself is just north of Florida State Highway 17 and Lake Letta. Counterfeit Lake is 0.25 miles (0.40 km) south of the north branch of Lake Letta Road. Griffin Grove Road, which looks more like a private grove road than a public road, reaches the north shore of the lake. Counterfeit Lake is completely surrounded by citrus groves and cannot be seen from either branch of Lake Letta Road. This lake has a 18-acre (73,000 m^{2}) surface area.

There is no public boat ramp or swimming beach. This lake can be fished. According to the Hook and Bullet website, this lake contains bullhead, bowfin and gar.
