= Lake Rachael =

Lake in the state of Florida, United States

- Location within Florida Location within the United States
- Location: Highlands County, Florida, United States
- Coordinates: 30°27′32″N 83°27′59″W
- Type: artificial
- Surface area: 9 acres (3.6 ha)

Lake Rachael is a 9 acres (3.6 ha) freshwater lake in Highlands County, Florida. This is a manmade lake, having been dredged out of an area of muck that in the past was a lake. Lake Rachael is circular and surrounded on all sides but a small section of its west side by houses. Lake Drive traverses around these houses on all but its west side. Western Boulevard runs north to south and borders the west side of the lake. Schumacher Road is two blocks to the north. Residential neighborhoods are located in the vicinity of the lake.

While Lake Rachael has seven private boat docks, there is no public access to the water's edge. Therefore no public boating, fishing or swimming are allowed.
