= Lake Bennet =

Lake in the state of Florida, United States

- Location within Florida Location within the United States
- Location: Ocoee, Florida, along West Colonial Drive
- Coordinates: 28°33′12″N 81°32′03″W
- Lake type: natural freshwater lake
- Basin countries: United States
- Max. length: 1,345 feet (410 m)
- Max. width: 815 feet (248 m)
- Surface area: 24.5 acres (10 ha)
- Max. depth: 20 feet (6.1 m)
- Surface elevation: 108 feet (33 m)

Lake Bennet, also spelled Bennett and also known as Lake Blanchard, is a somewhat kidney-shaped natural freshwater lake in Orange County, Florida. Florida State Road 50 (West Colonial Drive) travels over the south end of this lake. On the lake's northeast is the Lake Bennett Health & Rehabilitation Center. This lake is surrounded by commercial properties.

The lake has a fountain on the south end. There are no public boat ramps or swimming areas on this lake. The Hook and Bullet website says this lake contains largemouth bass, bream, bluegill and crappie.
