= Lake Addie (North Dakota) =

Lake in the state of North Dakota, United States

- Location within North Dakota
- Location: Griggs County, North Dakota
- Coordinates: 47°31′52″N 98°17′10″W
- Type: Lake
- Max. length: 1 mile (1.6 km)
- Max. width: 0.5 miles (0.80 km)
- Surface area: 455.6 acres (184.4 ha)
- Average depth: 19.7 feet (6.0 m)
- Max. depth: 29.3 feet (8.9 m)
- Water volume: 8,951.1 acre-feet (11,041,000 m^{3})
- Shore length^{1}: 4.7 miles (7.6 km)
- Surface elevation: 1,434 feet (437 m)
- ^{1} Shore length is not a well-defined measure.

Lake Addie is a body of water located three miles southeast of Binford in Addie Township, Griggs County, North Dakota. The lake has a surface area listed at 456 acres (185 ha). It is managed as a walleye and perch fishery. At times of low water, an isthmus separates the lake into north and south segments.
