= Little Coon Lake =

Lake in the state of Minnesota, United States

Coordinates: 45°18′43″N 93°6′39″W

- Location within Minnesota Location within the United States
- Location: Anoka County, Minnesota
- Type: Natural freshwater lake
- Basin countries: United States
- Max. length: 2,440 ft (740 m)
- Max. width: 1,940 ft (590 m)
- Surface elevation: 892 ft (272 m)

Little Coon Lake is a lake in Anoka County, Minnesota, in the United States.

Little Coon Lake was named for the abundant raccoons seen there by early settlers.

== See also ==
- List of lakes in Minnesota
