= Makepeace Lake =

- Location within New Jersey Location within the United States
- Location: Atlantic County, New Jersey
- Coordinates: 39.544°N 74.746°W
- Surface elevation: 52 feet (16 m)

Makepeace Lake is a 300-acre reservoir in Atlantic County, New Jersey, and part of the Pinelands National Reserve in the United States. It is found at an elevation of 52 feet (16 m). It is home to many species of dragonflies and damselflies. The lake drains into the Great Egg Harbor River. Makepeace Lake is quite shallow, and is home to many wetland plants and wildlife.

== Formation ==
The Makepeace Lake is man-made, and was formed by damming cranberry bogs in the 1930s. This cranberry bog was called the Bozarth cranberry bog.

== Wildlife ==
Dragonflies and damselflies are abundant in the warm months. Mallards, wood ducks, and the great blue heron are among the birds that can be found on the lake. Other birds include the barred owl, great-horned owl, and screech owl. Red-tailed hawks and Cooper's hawks can also be found. Many frogs become active in the spring. These include wood frogs, green frogs, northern gray treefrogs, and carpenter frogs.

In the summer, orioles and prairie warblers can be heard. Butterflies are brought to the lake by the blooming of milkweed and dogbanes in the summer. Virginia rails and king rails can be spotted here, especially in the marsh and swampy areas of the lake.

The call of the barred owl can be heard in the fall. Monarch butterflies are attracted by ironweed, goldenrod, and asters in the fall as well.
