= Lake Viola (Florida) =

Lake in the state of Florida, United States

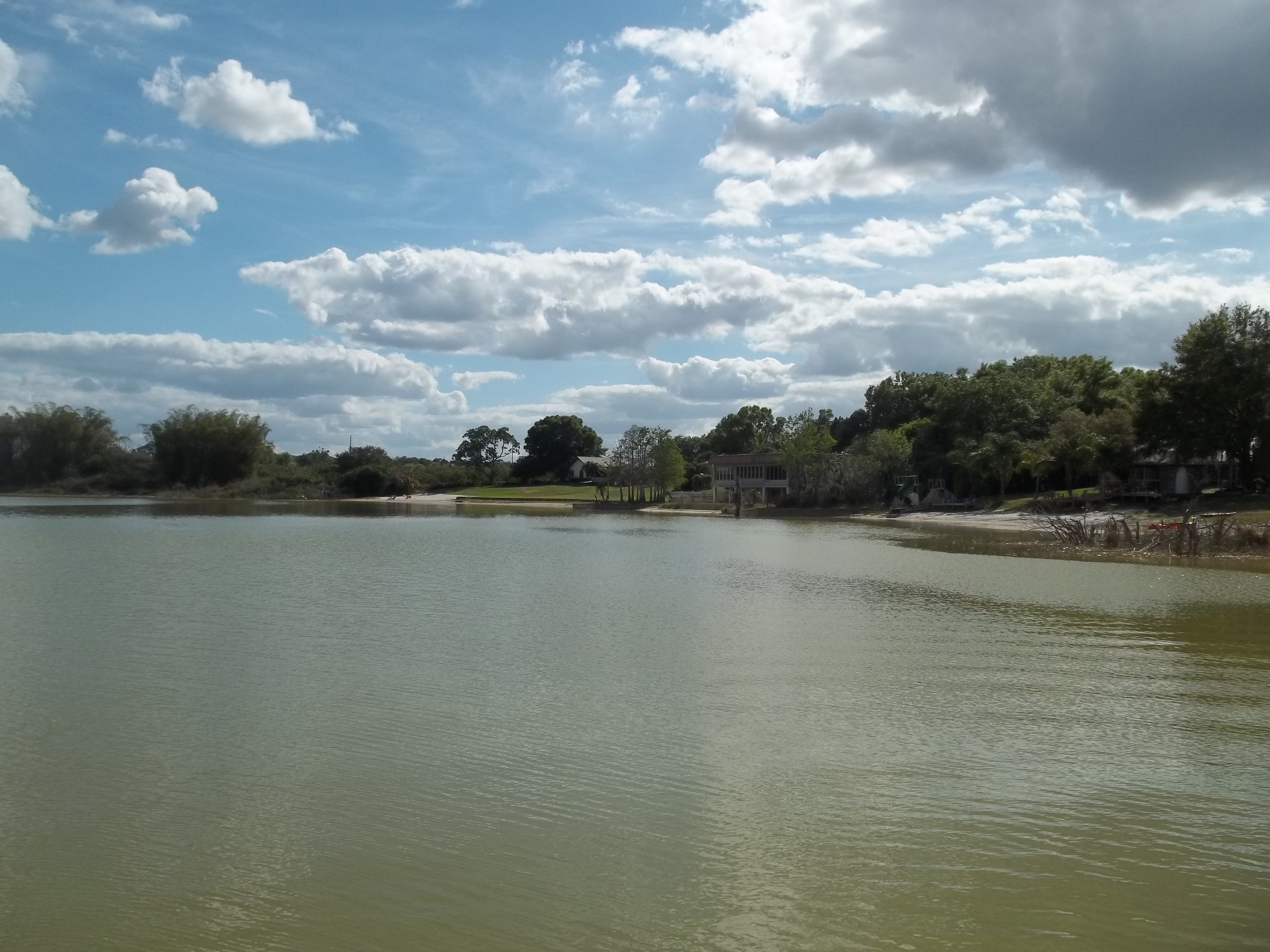

- Location within Florida Location within the United States
- Location: Highlands County, Florida
- Coordinates: 27°36′47″N 81°29′43″W
- Type: natural freshwater lake
- Basin countries: United States
- Surface area: 56 acres (23 ha)
- Max. depth: 26 ft (8 m)
- Surface elevation: 105 ft (32 m)

Lake Viola is a round natural lake in northern Highlands County, Florida. It is directly north of the city of Avon Park, Florida. Lake Viola has a surface area of fifty-six acres and a maximum depth of twenty-six feet.

This lake has many residences on its shore, especially on the east side. It has a public boat ramp on its northwest shore. It has a tiny swimming beach on its northeast shore, but this appears to be only for the use of lake residents. Since there is a boat ramp, public fishing is allowed by boat. The only public access to the lake is via the boat ramp.
