= Deep Creek Reservoir (Nevada) =

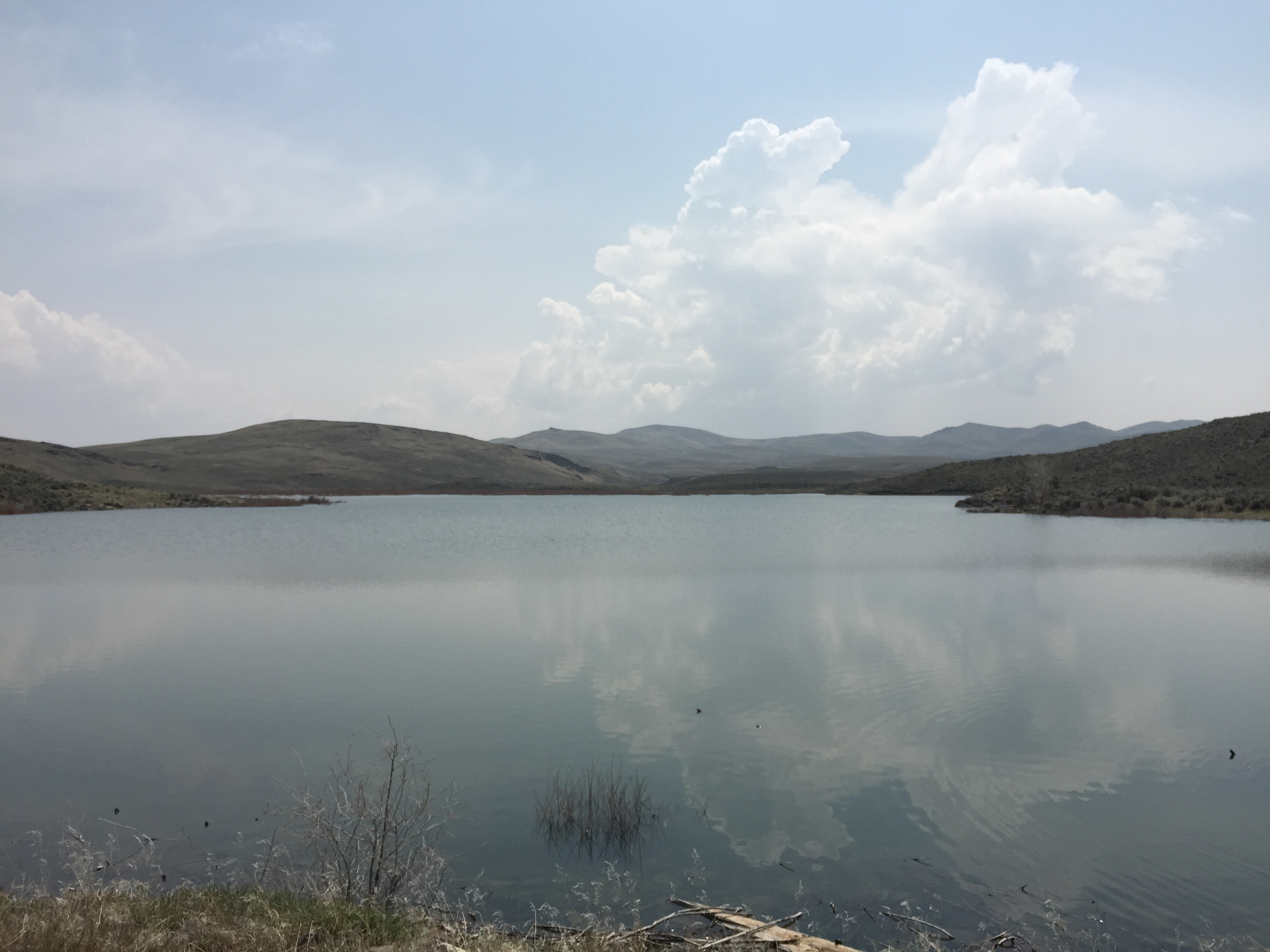
- View southeast across Deep Creek Reservoir

- Location of Deep Creek Reservoir in Nevada
- Location: Elko County, Nevada
- Coordinates: 41°35′24″N 116°18′39″W
- Type: Reservoir
- Primary inflows: Deep Creek Creek
- Primary outflows: Deep Creek Creek
- Basin countries: United States
- Surface elevation: 5,318 feet (1,621 m)

Deep Creek Reservoir is a man-made lake in Elko County, Nevada in the United States.

== See also ==
- List of dams in the Columbia River watershed
