= Lake Streety =

- Location within Florida Location within the United States
- Location: Polk County, Florida
- Coordinates: 27.6792°N 81.5701°W
- Type: natural freshwater lake
- Basin countries: United States
- Max. length: 1.02 mi (2 km)
- Max. width: 0.72 mi (1 km)
- Surface area: 324 acres (131 ha)
- Surface elevation: 105 ft (32 m)

Lake Streety is a natural freshwater lake in south Polk County, Florida. It is 0.4 mi (1 km) southwest of Little Sun Ray and 1.4 mi (2.3 km) southwest of Sun Ray. Both of these are small unincorporated communities. Lake Streety is just north of the Avon Park Cut Off Road and is bordered on the northeast by Lake Streety Road, which is a sand road. The lake has a 324-acre (1,310,000 m^{2}) surface area.

There are no public swimming areas or boat ramps on the lake's shore. However, since it borders Lake Streety Road, public fishing there is possible. The HookandBullet.Com website says the lake contains bullhead, crappie and warmouth.
