= Winkler Lake =

Lake in the state of Minnesota, United States

- Location within Minnesota
- Location: Carver County, Minnesota
- Coordinates: 44°47′24″N 93°49′57″W
- Type: lake

Winkler Lake is a lake in Carver County, Minnesota, in the United States.

Winkler Lake was named for Ignatz Wiknler, an early settler.
