= Phare Lake =

Lake in the state of Minnesota, United States

- Location within Minnesota
- Location: Renville County, Minnesota
- Coordinates: 44°49′29″N 94°34′38″W
- Type: lake

Phare Lake is a lake in Renville County in the U.S. state of Minnesota.

Phare Lake bears the name of a pioneer settler.
