= Cutthroat Lake =

Lake in the state of Utah, United States

- Location within Utah
- Location: Summit County, Utah
- Coordinates: 40°40′53″N 111°00′35″W
- Type: lake
- Basin countries: United States
- Surface elevation: 9,964 ft (3,037 m)

Cutthroat Lake is a lake in the Uinta Mountains in south‑central Summit County, Utah, United States.

The lake is located within the Uinta-Wasatch-Cache National Forest and was so named on account of the lake being stocked with cutthroat trout.

== See also ==
- List of lakes in Utah
