= Five Lake =

Lake in the state of Minnesota, United States

- Location within Minnesota
- Location: Otter Tail County, Minnesota
- Coordinates: 46°42′24″N 95°45′43″W
- Type: lake

Otter Tail County, Minnesota

Five Lake is a lake in Otter Tail County, in the U.S. state of Minnesota.

Five Lake was so named from its location in section 5 of the county.

== See also ==
- List of lakes in Minnesota
