= Severance Lake =

Lake in the state of Minnesota, United States

- Location within Minnesota
- Location: Sibley County, Minnesota
- Coordinates: 44°40′54″N 94°7′15″W
- Type: lake

Severance Lake is a lake in Sibley County, in the U.S. state of Minnesota.

Severance Lake was named for Martin Juan Severance, a state legislator.
