= Mandall Lake =

Lake in the state of Minnesota, United States

- Location within Minnesota
- Location: Chisago County, Minnesota
- Coordinates: 45°36′14″N 93°5′6″W
- Type: lake

Mandall Lake is a lake in Chisago County, Minnesota, in the United States.

Mandall Lake was named for Lars Mandall, a pioneer settler.

== See also ==
- List of lakes in Minnesota
