= Skogman Lake =

Lake in the state of Minnesota, United States

- Location within Minnesota
- Location: Chisago and Isanti County, Minnesota
- Coordinates: 45°34′26″N 93°9′8″W
- Type: lake

Skogman Lake is a lake in the U.S. state of Minnesota.

Skogman Lake was named for a Swedish pioneer who settled there.

== See also ==
- List of lakes in Minnesota
