= Lake Katherine (Arcadia, Florida) =

Lake in the state of Florida, United States

- Location within Florida Location within the United States
- Location: On south side of State Route 72, Arcadia, DeSoto County, Florida
- Coordinates: 27°13′08″N 81°52′21″W
- Lake type: freshwater lake
- Basin countries: United States
- Max. length: 680 feet (210 m)
- Max. width: 270 feet (82 m)
- Surface area: 25.71 acres (10 ha)
- Surface elevation: 26 feet (7.9 m)

Lake Katherine is a small freshwater lake surrounded by a park in Arcadia, Florida. The lake is surrounded by a walking path, park benches and an exercise station. A T-33 jet is on display on the west side of the lake and a fountain is roughly in the center of the lake.

No boating or swimming is allowed in Lake Katherine. The lake is additionally uninhabited by fish.
