= Waddell Lake =

- Location within Washington (state) Location within the United States
- Location: North Cascades National Park, Chelan County, Washington, United States
- Coordinates: 48°26′22″N 120°49′01″W
- Type: Alpine lake
- Primary inflows: Waddell Creek
- Primary outflows: Waddell Creek
- Basin countries: United States
- Max. length: 300 yd (270 m)
- Max. width: 200 yd (180 m)
- Surface elevation: 4,954 ft (1,510 m)

Waddell Lake is in North Cascades National Park, in the U. S. state of Washington. The lake is not accessible via any designated trails but is only about 1.5 mi (2.4 km) southeast of the Pacific Crest Trail and the Bridge Creek junction.
