= Lake Aurora =

Lake in Florida, United States

- Location of Lake Aurora in Florida Location of Lake Aurora in the USA
- Location: Polk County, Florida
- Coordinates: 27°52′50.98″N 81°27′59.70″W
- Primary outflows: Kissimmee River/Below Lake Hatchineha
- Basin countries: United States
- Surface area: 117 acres (0.47 km^{2})
- Average depth: 12 ft (3.7 m)
- Max. depth: 45 ft (14 m)
- Water volume: 797,087,472 US gal (3.02×10^{6} m^{3})
- Settlements: Lake Wales, Florida

Lake Aurora is a freshwater lake located in eastern Polk County, Florida. The lake is approximately 9 miles (14 km) east of Lake Wales on State Road 60. While not a very big lake, the lake is relatively deep compared to other central Florida lakes with an average depth of 12 ft (3.7 m) and a maximum depth of 45 ft (14 m). The depth of the lake as well as its crystal blue waters indicate that the lake was probably once a sinkhole which filled with water. The lake is in an area east of the Lake Wales Ridge dominated by scrub oak with occasional sandspur clearings. The lake is perhaps best known for being the home of the Lake Aurora Christian Camp and Retreat Center, a summer camp owned by Christian churches in the central Florida area.
