= Sellards Lake =

Lake in the state of Minnesota, United States

- Location within Minnesota
- Location: Meeker County, Minnesota
- Coordinates: 45°4′28″N 94°19′44″W
- Type: lake

Sellards Lake is a lake in Meeker County, in the U.S. state of Minnesota.

Sellards Lake was named for Thomas Sellards, an early settler.

== See also ==
- List of lakes in Minnesota
