= Lake Lotta =

Lake in the state of Florida, United States

- Location within Florida Location within the United States
- Location: eastern edge of Ocoee, Florida, along West Colonial Drive
- Coordinates: 28°33′01″N 81°30′43″W
- Lake type: natural freshwater lake
- Basin countries: United States
- Max. length: 1,955 feet (596 m)
- Max. width: 910 feet (280 m)
- Surface area: 43.86 acres (18 ha)
- Surface elevation: 85 feet (26 m)

Lake Lotta is a kidney-shaped natural freshwater lake in Orange County, Florida. Florida State Road 50 (West Colonial Drive) travels over this lake. To the east are shopping areas and to the north, south and west are residential areas. The only public access to this lake is along Vizcaya Lake Road, along part of the southeast shore of the lake. There are no swimming areas or public boat ramps on this lake. No reliable fishing information exists for Lake Lotta on online sites.
