= Lake Ring =

- Location within Florida Location within the United States
- Location: Winter Haven, Florida
- Coordinates: 28.0092°N 81.7023°W
- Type: natural freshwater lake
- Basin countries: United States
- Max. length: 340 feet (100 m)
- Max. width: 325 feet (99 m)
- Surface area: 3.3 acres (1 ha)
- Surface elevation: 128 feet (39 m)

Lake Ring, is a tiny lake in eastern Winter Haven, Florida, which is almost round in shape. This lake is a natural freshwater lake with a 3.3-acre (13,000 m^{2}) surface area. This lake is bordered on all sides by residences along Lake Ring Drive.

The public has no access to this lake, as it is completely surrounded by private property. The Hook and Bullet website says, however, Lake Ring contains largemouth bass, bluegill and crappie.
