= Seven Beaver Lake =

Lake in the state of Minnesota, United States

- Location within Minnesota
- Location: St. Louis County, Minnesota
- Coordinates: 47°30′0″N 91°48′41″W
- Type: lake

Seven Beaver Lake is a lake in the U.S. state of Minnesota.

The lake's name comes from the Ojibwe Indians of the area, who hunted beavers near the lake.

The lake is the source of the Saint Louis River.

== See also ==
- List of lakes in Minnesota
