= Jim Cook Lake =

Lake in the state of Minnesota, United States

- Location within Minnesota
- Location: Wadena County, Minnesota
- Coordinates: 46°44′48″N 95°0′39″W
- Type: lake

Jim Cook Lake is a lake in Wadena County, in the U.S. state of Minnesota.

Jim Cook Lake bears the name of Jim Cook, a pioneer settler.

== See also ==
- List of lakes in Minnesota
