= Bonnet Lake =

Lake in the state of Florida, United States

- Lake Bonnet
- Location within Florida
- Location: Highlands County, Florida
- Coordinates: 27°32′37″N 81°26′31″W
- Type: freshwater lake
- Basin countries: United States
- Max. length: 1.1-mile (1.8 km)
- Max. width: 0.55-mile (0.89 km)
- Surface area: 268 acres (108 ha)
- Max. depth: 10 ft (3 m)
- Surface elevation: 89 feet (27 m)
- Islands: 5

Bonnet Lake or Lake Bonnet is a 268-acre (1,080,000 m^{2}) natural freshwater lake in Highlands County, Florida. It is bounded on the north by Lake Bonnet Village, on its west by Bonnet Lake Campgrounds, on its southwest by a railroad line and on its south and southeast by Highlands Ridge. On part of its north shore is a citrus grove. To the lake's northeast is a large wooded area. Lake Bonnet Village and Bonnet Lake Campgrounds are mobile home and recreational vehicle parks for residents aged 55 and greater. Highlands Village is a retirement housing development.

The lake was so named for the abundance of a water flower called "bonnets".

== Boating and fishing information ==
There are no boat ramps that can be used by the public. There are no public swimming areas on the lake shore. Bonnet Lake may be fished. The HookandBullet.Com website says the lake contains bluegill, gar and blue catfish.

== Islands of lake ==
Most of the small natural lakes in the area have no or very few islands in them. Bonnet Lake has five islands, none of which have structures on them. All are small or very small. Two are located just off the shore of Lake Bonnet Village. One of these islands, the lake's largest and triangular in shape, is 300 feet (91 m) west of the boat ramp. It is in front of the entrance to a canal. To enter the canal, boats must go around the island, which measures 200 feet (61 m) across its widest point. The other island off the Village is between the boat ramp and a private boat dock west of the ramp. It measures 100 feet (30 m) by 20 feet (6.1 m).

Two of the islands are just off the shore of Bonnet Lake Campgrounds. One of them, at the north end of the Campgrounds, measures 45 feet (14 m) by 40 feet (12 m). The other is further south and is somewhat round, measuring 75 feet (23 m) by 75 feet (23 m). A very tiny island, 10 feet (3.0 m) by 5 feet (1.5 m), is off the northeast shore of Lake Bonnet.
