= Houston Lake (Georgia) =

- Location within Georgia Location within the United States
- Location: Houston County, Georgia
- Coordinates: 32.5038402°N 83.6779635°W
- Type: Reservoir
- Basin countries: United States
- Surface area: 150 acres (0.61 km^{2})

Houston Lake is located approximately ten miles 10 miles (16 km) southwest of Warner Robins, Georgia, in central Houston County, Georgia on Mossy Creek.

== Nearby community ==
The area around Houston Lake has been populated since the mid-1800s. The first dam at the site was constructed to provide water power for milling operations. By the middle of the 20th century, the 150-acre lake had become a center of recreation with an earthen dam. Upper class private homes, a country club, and a golf club were constructed around the lake in later half of the century. These developments cut off public access to the lake until the late 1990s.

== Flood of 1994 ==
On July 3, 1994, Tropical Storm Alberto (1994) came ashore near Destin, Florida. The storm then drifted into central Georgia and stalled for days before drifting westward into Alabama and dissipating. Severe flooding occurred throughout central Georgia. Nearby Macon, Georgia set a single day rainfall record of 10.25 inches. At Perry, Georgia, the closest gaging station to Houston Lake, the former records for flood height and flow were shattered; from 8.27 feet and 788 cubic feet/second, to 21.75 feet and 24,000 cubic feet per second, though this record may have been affected by dam breaks upstream.

On Tuesday, July 5, 1994, the Houston Lake earthen dam failed. Downstream areas were submerged suddenly, requiring rapid evacuation by emergency personnel. After the floodwaters receded, the lake was left empty and formerly lakefront property overlooking the muddy lake bottom.

Controversially, public funds were later used to repair the dam and restore Houston Lake. Outcry over the use of government funds to benefit wealthy landowners and country club members who had long excluded the public was widespread. Ultimately, FEMA funds were used to rebuild the dam and provide public access for fishing and boating on the lake.
