= Lake Mariam =

- Location within Florida Location within the United States
- Location: Winter Haven, Florida
- Coordinates: 28.0164°N 81.6965°W
- Type: natural freshwater lake
- Basin countries: United States
- Max. length: 3,570 feet (1,090 m)
- Max. width: 2,680 feet (820 m)
- Surface area: 200 acres (81 ha)
- Surface elevation: 128 feet (39 m)

Lake Mariam is roughly oval in shape and is on the northeast side of Winter Haven, Florida. The Polk County Water Atlas says sometimes the lake is known as Lake Marion, but a different Lake Marion is also in Polk County, Florida, where Lake Mariam is located. It has a surface area of 200 acres (809,371 m^{2}) and is bordered on the west side, most of the south side and part of the north side by residential areas. Brandywine Health Care Center, a nursing home, is a block north of the lake. On the northwest and southwest Lake Mariam is bordered by woods and on most of the east side of the lake are woods and pastureland. On the lake's southeast side is a swampy area.

There are no public swimming areas on Lake Mariam, but a public boat ramp is on the lake's north side, to the back side of Brandywine Health Care Center. Boating and fishing are allowed. The public may fish near the boat ramp or by boat. The Hook and Bullet website says the lake contains largemouth bass, bluegill and crappie.
