= Hickory Hills Lake =

- Cattails and fishing dock

- Location within Mississippi Location within the United States
- Location: Lamar County, Mississippi
- Coordinates: 31°16′37″N 89°24′06″W
- Type: artificial lake
- Basin countries: United States
- Surface area: 60 acres (24 ha)

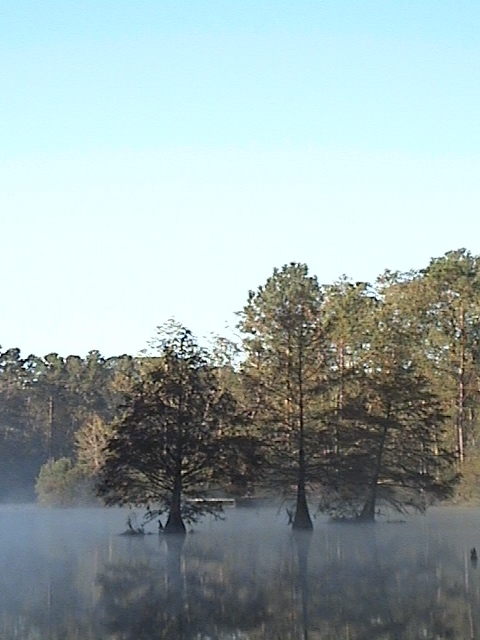
Hickory Hills Lake

Hickory Hills Lake is a privately owned freshwater lake in eastern Lamar County, Mississippi, southwest of the town of Hattiesburg. The lake was constructed in 1974, and is surrounded by a subdivision of 2 to 12-acre (49,000 m^{2}) homesteads.

== Lake ==
The lake is approximately 60 acres (240,000 m^{2}), and is impounded by an earthen dam. The dam contains a bell-mouth service spillway which exits via an overflow tower on the dry side of the dam. There is also an uncontrolled auxiliary spillway that only functions during high water periods.

The lake is maintained primarily for sportfishing.

== Fishing ==
Primary gamefish include largemouth bass, crappie, and bluegill. The property owners' association fertilizes the lake each year to promote gamefish growth. The water level of the lake is intentionally lowered during the winter months to reduce excessive shoreline vegetation growth.

Because the lake is private, only owners, their families, and invited guests are allowed to fish. Gasoline powered motors are not allowed, and electric trolling motors are sufficient for navigation.

Because of the ban on gasoline engines, water skiing and jet skiing are not allowed. The large number of obstructions such as stumps also prevent these activities.

Hunting and the use of firearms are prohibited on and around the lake by the by-laws of the Hickory Hills Property Owners Association (HHPOA).

== Hickory Hills subdivision ==
The subdivision of Hickory Hills is a gated community entirely surrounding Hickory Hills Lake. The entrance to the community is located on Richburg Road in Lamar County near the intersection of Richburg Road and Old U.S. 11. Access is provided via keypad and remote controlled gates.

Most lots in the subdivision have some sort of housing. Types of housing range from small cabins to larger homes.

Hickory Hills Loop is the circular road around the perimeter of the subdivision. It is a gravel road which is periodically graded, and is easily passable by all types of vehicles year round.

== Utilities ==
In 2000, the HHPOA replaced the aging water system that delivered tap water to properties around the lake. The old system ran under the lake and frequently required repairs. The new water system was installed at a cost of approximately $100,000, and runs around the outside perimeter of Hickory Hills Loop. Following installation, Lamar County took control over the new water system.

In the late 1990s, BellSouth replaced parts of the telephone wiring in Hickory Hills. Portions of the aerial cabling, including the stretch running across the dam, had deteriorated and become unreliable. Telephone outages were common following rain storms. The dam portion was replaced with temporary overground wiring, and eventually with a new aerial span.

Due to Hurricane Katrina damage, BellSouth replaced most of the aerial cabling in 2005.

Cable television is unavailable at Hickory Hills. Some residents have reported being able to get high speed Internet service via telephone lines.

A cabin at Hickory Hills Lake on a snowy December in 1994

== Access ==
Access to the subdivision and lake is controlled via gates, and not available to the general public.

== Property owners association ==
The Hickory Hills Property Owners Association (HHPOA) is responsible for management of the lake, dam, and road system inside the subdivision. The HHPOA also controls the bylaws which govern properties within Hickory Hills.
