= Moody Lake =

Lake in the state of Florida, United States

- Location within Florida Location within the United States
- Location: northwest of Dade City, Florida
- Coordinates: 28°24′41″N 82°17′55″W
- Lake type: natural freshwater lake
- Basin countries: United States
- Max. length: 4,210 ft (1,280 m)
- Max. width: 4,210 ft (1,280 m)
- Surface area: 198.72 acres (80 ha)
- Surface elevation: 102 ft (31 m)
- Islands: 10

Moody Lake is a natural freshwater lake in Pasco County, Florida. It was once one body of water, but it now is in two parts having been split when Interstate 75 was built through its center. Ten islets are contained within this lake. Its shores are very wooded and a few residences dot its shores. There are no public boat ramps or no public swimming areas on the shore. None of the fishing websites have information about types of fish in this lake.
