= Monogram Lake =

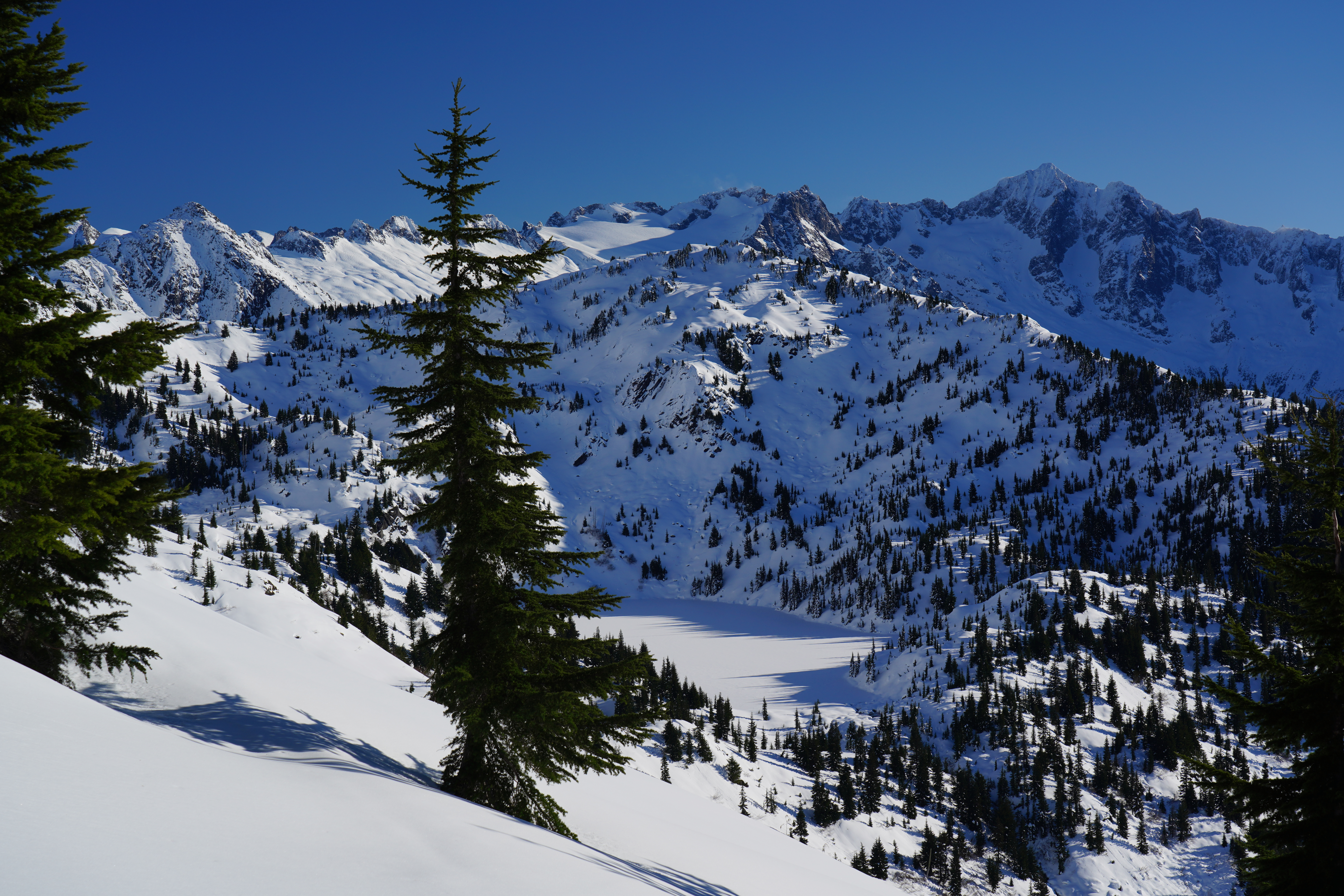
- Monogram Lake in December 2020

- Location within Washington (state) Location within the United States
- Location: North Cascades National Park, Skagit County, Washington, United States
- Coordinates: 48°33′25″N 121°16′50″W
- Type: Alpine lake
- Primary outflows: Monogram Creek
- Basin countries: United States
- Max. length: .25 mi (0.40 km)
- Max. width: .25 mi (0.40 km)
- Surface elevation: 4,879 ft (1,487 m)

Monogram Lake is located in North Cascades National Park, in the U. S. state of Washington. Monogram Lake can be reached by trail from Snoqualmie National Forest. The distance from the trailhead to the lake is 5 mi (8.0 km) one way and is considered strenuous since it requires an altitude gain of 4,040 ft (1,230 m). The lake is situated two miles east of Lookout Mountain, and 1.5 mile south of Little Devil Peak. The lake drains to the Cascade River via Monogram Creek.
