= Engineers Lake =

- Location within Florida
- Location: Haines City, Florida
- Coordinates: 28.0806°N 81.6312°W
- Lake type: natural freshwater lake
- Basin countries: United States
- Max. length: 845 feet (258 m)
- Max. width: 655 feet (200 m)
- Surface area: 12.15 acres (5 ha)
- Surface elevation: 121 feet (37 m)

Engineers Lake, a small oval-shaped lake, has a surface area of 12.15-acre (49,200 m^{2}). This lake is on the south side of Haines City, Florida, and is in a suburban area. It is bordered by residences, woods and grassland. It is 780 feet (240 m) north of Little Lake Hamilton.

Engineers Lake has no public access along its shores. Permission of property owners must be obtained to reach this lake. The Take Me Fishing website says this lake contains largemouth bass and bluegill.
