= Mahla Lake =

Lake in the state of Minnesota, United States

- Location within Minnesota
- Location: Douglas County, Minnesota
- Coordinates: 46°0′0″N 95°45′10″W
- Type: lake

Mahla Lake is a lake in Douglas County, in the U.S. state of Minnesota.

Mahla Lake was named for M. H. Mahla, a pioneer farmer who settled there.

== See also ==
- List of lakes in Minnesota
