= Wells Lake (Minnesota) =

Lake in the state of Minnesota, United States

- Location within Minnesota
- Location: Rice County, Minnesota
- Coordinates: 44°17′18″N 93°20′35″W
- Type: lake

Wells Lake is a lake in Rice County, in the U.S. state of Minnesota.

Like Wells Township, Wells Lake was named for James "Bully" Wells, a pioneer settler.
