= Mountain Lodge Lake =

- Location within Florida Location within the United States
- Location: Polk County, Florida
- Coordinates: 27.9286°N 81.6108°W
- Type: natural freshwater lake
- Basin countries: United States
- Max. length: 2,245 ft (684 m)
- Max. width: 255 ft (78 m)
- Surface area: 39.22 acres (16 ha)
- Surface elevation: 121 ft (37 m)

Mountain Lodge Lake is not labelled on most maps, even though it is larger than some neighboring lakes. It has a 39.22-acre (158,700 m^{2}) surface area and is roughly in the shape of an hourglass. The eastern part of the hourglass is oval-shaped. The western part is round, but considerably smaller than the eastern part. The middle of the hourglass is about a one-third as wide as the width of the other two wide parts of the lake. Mountain Lodge Lake is just north of Lake Wales, Florida. It is bounded on the east by US Highway 27, on the southeast by a vehicle dealership, on the west and southwest by a citrus orchard, on the northwest by woods and on the north by Vanguard School.

This lake has no public swimming area or boat ramp. It has two private boat ramps, one at Vanguard School for instructional use in boating. Along US 27 there is public access for fishing. The Hook and Bullet website says Mountain Lodge Lake contains gar, bullhead and bowfin.
