= Anacoco Lake =

- Location within the United States Location within Louisiana
- Location: Vernon Parish, Louisiana, US
- Coordinates: 31.11°N 93.37°W
- Type: Reservoir
- Basin countries: United States
- Surface area: 1,100 ha (2,600 acres)
- Average depth: 2.8 m (9.2 ft)
- Max. depth: 11 m (35 ft)
- Shore length^{1}: 34 km (21 mi)
- Surface elevation: 62.8 m (206.0 ft)
- Islands: Rabbit Island
- Settlements: Leesville
- ^{1} Shore length is not a well-defined measure.

Anacoco Lake, also known as Anacoco Reservoir, is a man-made lake in Vernon Parish, Louisiana, 10 miles (16 km) west of Leesville, Louisiana. The lake was created in 1951, the result of impounding Anacoco Creek, Caney Creek, Prairie Creek, and Sandy Creek, for the purpose of water supply and recreation.

== History ==
The Louisiana Legislature passed La. Act 277 of 1948 creating the Anacoco-Prairie State Game and Fish Preserve, setting aside 5,379 acres (2,177 ha) of land, money for the purchase of wild game and fish, and for restocking purposes, as well as for the building and maintenance of a dam. A second dam was authorized but no money provided. Construction was completed in 1951.

== Ownership and maintenance ==
The State of Louisiana owns the land under the lake and the Louisiana Department of Wildlife & Fisheries (LDWF) manages the fish and wildlife resources. The Louisiana Department of Transportation and Development has authority and maintenance over the levees, dam, and associated structures.

=== Lake Authority ===
Act 858 of the 1981 Legislature abolished the Anacoco Prairie Game and Fish Commission and transferred authority to the Louisiana Department of Wildlife and Fisheries. The law provided for a panel of citizens to be appointed to an advisory board. The Vernon Parish Police Jury established the Vernon Parish Game and Fish Commission composed of nine members that includes two members of the jury.

== Construction ==
Anacoco Lake is impounded by an earthen dam with stone riprap approximately 4,670 feet (1,420 m) in length. The dam has a 12 foot (3.7 m) crown and the lake is 206.0 feet (62.8 m) above mean sea level (MSL). The maximum height of the embankment is 37 feet (11 m). The dam has a six by six feet (1.8 by 1.8 m) sluice gate that the LDWF has listed in bad shape.

The original dam failed on January 21, 1956, and two hurricanes in 1957 hindered replacement until 1958
