= Avon Park =

Avon Park may refer to:

- Avon Park, Florida, a city in Highlands County, Florida, U.S.
  - Avon Park Lakes, Florida, a nearby unincorporated community
  - Avon Park Historic District, a district on the National Register of Historic Places
  - Avon Park Executive Airport, a public airport nearby
  - Avon Park High School, a high school there
- Avon Park, New Jersey, a locality in the town of South Plainfield, New Jersey, U.S.
- Avon Park, York, a park in the town of York, Western Australia on the Avon River
