= Lake Letta =

Lake in the state of Florida, United States

- Location within Florida Location within the United States
- Location: Highlands County, Florida
- Coordinates: 27°33′40″N 81°27′45″W
- Type: Natural freshwater lake
- Basin countries: United States
- Max. length: 1 mile (1.6 km)
- Max. width: 0.9 miles (1.4 km)
- Surface area: 478 acres (193 ha)
- Surface elevation: 95 feet (29 m)

Lake Letta is a natural freshwater lake in Highlands County, Florida. It has a 478-acre (1,930,000 m^{2}) surface area. It is bounded on the east and north by Florida State Highway 17, on the southeast by Lake Letta Drive, on the south by citrus orchards, on the west by Little Bonnet Lake and a golf course and on the northwest by pastures. It is connected to Little Lake Bonnet by a canal. Lake Letta is about 0.6 miles (0.97 km) southwest of the city limits of Avon Park, Florida. Residences, along Highway 17 and Lake Letta Drive, line most of the east and southeast sides of Lake Letta. Lake Letta RV Park is across Highway 17 from the lake in the middle of its east side.

Lake Letta has a public boat ramp on its north side, just off Highway 17. Fishing is allowed; one posting on the Hook and Bullet website says the lake has sturgeon, warmouth and blue catfish. However, this lake has no public swimming areas.
