= Shelby Dressel =

American singer-songwriter

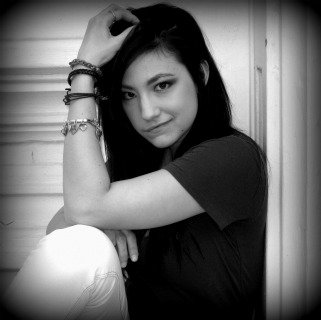
- Shelby Dressel, Franklin, TN

Background information
- Born: Shelby Kathleen Dressel; October 25, 1990 (age 36)
- Origin: Avon Park, Florida, United States
- Genre: Country
- Occupations: Singer-songwriter, musician
- Instruments: Vocals, acoustic guitar, harmonica
- Years active: 2003-present
- Label: Unsigned
- Website: Official website

Shelby Kathleen Dressel (born October 25, 1990) is an American country singer-songwriter from Avon Park, Florida, who made the top 46 on the ninth season of American Idol. Describing Dressel's ambitions, Rachel Pleasant Chambliss of Lakeland, Florida's "The Ledger" wrote, "At 19, Shelby Dressel still has a lot of things to figure out. Singing isn't one of them. She's been singing her whole life, and there's not a single doubt in her mind that singing is what she wants to do for a living." Dressel was born with an undeveloped 7th cranial nerve, leaving the right side of her face paralyzed. Overcoming this condition, Dressel had a successful initial audition for American Idol in Orlando, Florida. In spite of her elimination from the show, Dressel's "beautiful voice" had an immediate impact on the Idol judges and on Simon Cowell in particular.

== Biography ==
=== Early life ===
Dressel was a waitress at Bob Evans in Sebring, Florida before she left Florida to head to Hollywood for the filming of American Idol. She was raised on a dairy farm in Avon Park, Florida. Her father, Gary Dressel, is an agriculture instructor; and her mother Kathleen Dressel a paralegal. Her parents divorced when Dressel was young. She has 12 siblings from a blended family. Her father, Gary, sings and plays the guitar, so music was a part of Dressel's life since childhood. Other musical members of her family include: some of her brothers who play the acoustic guitar; a grandmother who plays the piano; and a maternal grandfather who played both the piano and the fiddle. In middle school, Dressel took up the sport of golf and continued that through high school. She also played soccer throughout high school. Dressel attended Avon Park High School, where she graduated in 2009. She was 2nd runner-up for the spot of homecoming queen. After graduating from high school, she enrolled at South Florida Community College During an interview with Ocala Style Magazine, Dressel mentioned that she is still at college working on an Associate's Degree (otherwise known as Associate of the Arts), as she continues to pursue her music career. On August 21, 2010, an interview aired on WFHT 1390am, with co-hosts Liz and Lin. During that broadcast, Dressel stated she is enrolling in an online schooling program to earn her degree, due to the possibility of her future relocation.

=== Music Early On ===
"Music is just my passion. It's so therapeutic. It gets you out of any kind of stress or tension or anything like that, and I just love it," Dressel said. Dressel performed at the Future Farmers of America Talent Contest in Orlando, Florida. Her first time singing in front of a crowd, Dressel, an eighth-grade student at the time, was able to win first place. Dressel returned to the talent contest. On one occasion, she was suffering from laryngitis, but still took herself to the stage for her performance. Her father, Gary, said, "She made it through that performance, and it was a struggle. It was the most exciting thing that ever happened to her or me." She won the FFA's Talent Contest in 2003 and in 2005 performing a duet with friend and classmate Logan Palmer. Dressel performed at a 4th of July celebration in her home town in 2009. Also in 2009, Dressel began to teach herself how to play the guitar with the aide of a tutorial book. After only practicing for 2 months with the guitar guide, she was able to play guitar during a performance at the Colgate Country Showdown. At the Showdown, the Shelby Dressel Band performed "Not the Waiting Kind", which is written by Dressel and was later re-titled "Not Worth the Wait." They placed 5th in the competition. While in 10th grade, Dressel and her friend Logan Palmer tried out for the TV show Can You Duet in Nashville, Tennessee, performing the Dixie Chicks song "Long Time Gone". Dressel considers Martina McBride, Sara Evans, and Reba McEntire musical influences in her life. Dressel also was exposed to a lot of Outlaw Country in her youth, as a result of her father's musical interests. Dressel considers her biggest musical influence to be Miranda Lambert. In an interview with Dave Schlenker, Dressel described her music style, saying, "I would say Miranda Lambert is the closest I can get to describing my sound. She sings more like Texas-outlaw-type country, which isn't necessarily what I do. It's not rock. It's not pop. It's country. Country is what I do, that's my background."

=== Dedication to Church ===
A big dedication in her life is to her church, the Union Congregational Church, located in Avon Park, Florida. She has been singing there since she was 7 years of age. Her pastor, Tiger Gullett, said she is not like other girls with a good voice, "She's just a good 'ol country girl." Gullett said, "She sings from her soul." She's part of a singing group at the church and also helps with mentoring and volunteering. Dressel sang her first solo number at church when she was in fourth grade. Jim Lanier, the music director of the church stated, "She has the most precious voice; everybody loves to hear her sing. She's always a favorite at church. She sang from the heart."

=== Shelby Dressel Band ===
Dressel's passion for music drove her to form a band, the Shelby Dressel Band. The band members include: Shelby Dressel, Chad Elders, Matt Flowers, David Hale (known as Pastor Dave), Ryan Cook, and Dave McDonald. Dressel is the lead vocalist and plays the acoustic guitar. Elders is the drummer and provides percussion. Flowers plays acoustic guitar and provides backup harmonies. Pastor Dave is the bass player. Cook plays both the electric and acoustic guitar, while McDonald plays both guitars as well as the mandolin and harmonica. The band placed 5th at the Colgate Country Showdown in 2009, where they performed Dressel's original song, "Not the Waiting Kind," later renamed "Not Worth the Wait." The band performs some songs written by Dressel, including "The End", "Not Worth the Wait," "Coming Back Around", and "Hear It From Me."

=== Facial Paralysis ===
Dressel was born with an undeveloped 7th cranial nerve, leaving the right side of her face paralyzed. The condition is known as congenital right facial paralysis. During her American Idol pre-interview, Dressel said, "I wasn't able to smile correctly or use the right side of my face." On expressing the impact the condition had on her growing up, Dressel told Leigh Howard, "I had no idea that there was no one else like me. I live in a small town. My friends and family hardly notice that there's anything different about me." When talking with Ryan Seacrest prior to her audition performance for season 9 of American Idol, Dressel said the condition made her a "little uncomfortable" but that "when it comes to chasing your dreams and going after what you want, to set that to the side and do it." When she was a guest on The Ellen DeGeneres Show, which aired February 23, 2010, Dressel told DeGeneres that, "It's just something that you are more acceptable to when you know it your whole life." The weekend of June 5, 2010, Dressel made a surprising visit to Evans, Georgia, to meet up with a young girl who has the same condition. The girl's family had seen Dressel's American Idol appearance and personally invited her to spend the weekend at their home, hoping that Dressel would offer their daughter inspiration. Dressel and her manager drove 8-hours to make the surprise visit, and spent the day at their home. This was the first time Dressel had met someone with the same condition, however since her American Idol showing, Dressel has received many emails from people who suffer from facial paralysis. Dressel said, "Facial paralysis doesn't affect anyone's intelligence or talents." Courage to Smile, a support group for people with facial paralysis and their families, credits Dressel as an inspiration for their formation.

== American Idol journey ==
=== Season 9 ===
Dressel auditioned for Season 9 of American Idol at the Orlando, Florida auditions. Family and friends attempted to have her audition a year earlier, to no avail. Her aunt eventually persuaded her to audition by taping a newspaper article mentioning the Orlando audition times to the refrigerator. During her audition, Dressel sang the song "Turn Me On" by Norah Jones which aired on January 20, 2010. In the middle of the audition, she had a moment where she forgot her lyrics and showed the four judges her down-to-earth side. Dressel said, "I was kind of surprised they were letting me sing so long. I started second-guessing myself." She received four yeses from the judges and moved on to Hollywood Week. Although not televised by Fox, Dressel's first round song during Hollywood Week was "A Little Past Little Rock", which is originally sung by Lee Ann Womack. The following step of Hollywood Week was the group round. For the group round performance, Dressel was a member of the group called the Suffragettes. Shelby's groupmates included Audri Vargas, Candice Glover and Kelsey Laverack/Rey, who later appeared on The Voice. The group performed Alicia Keys' song "Superwoman". For Dressel's third song for the week, she had a little difficulty remembering her lyrics during her practice; however she was able to present a Boston song, "More Than a Feeling", with no problems. She made it to the top 50 contestants for the show, but was sent home when they made cuts for the top 24 Idol selection, which aired on Fox on February 16, 2010. Simon Cowell deemed it a "mistake" that Dressel was sent home.

=== Season 10 ===
Dressel auditioned for American Idol's tenth season in Nashville, Tennessee during the weekend of July 17, 2010. She advanced to the second and third round of auditions based on her performance of Natalie Grant's "In Better Hands Now".

=== Season 14 ===
Dressel then auditioned a third time for Idol's fourteenth season, once again in Nashville. This time, despite her audition not being shown, she advanced to Hollywood Week.

== Post-Idol ==
=== Immediate attention ===
Dressel caught the attention of many after her performances on season 9 of American Idol. On February 16, 2010, she was the seventh-ranked search at Google, and actually had more searches for her name than any contestant in the top 24 ranking. At that time, Dressel's official website had over 10,000 visitors in less than 24 hours. She is receiving many fan emails. Fan clubs have been established on the social networking website Facebook, with thousands of members, and Dressel's personal Facebook page is hit with hundreds of friend requests daily. Fans have also frequented YouTube to watch videos from her various performances, which are uploaded by fans. Dressel created her own YouTube channel and in the months to follow a fan YouTube channel also emerged, which received over 300 subscribers after only a few weeks. Her American Idol audition has had over 50,000 viewers, with multiple videos being uploaded to YouTube. The videos of her performance on The Ellen DeGeneres Show have netted over 6,000 views. A personal video, with a performance of Miranda Lambert's song "White Liar" has had over 900 views in less than three months. When Dressel returned to her hometown, the radio station WWOJ 99.1 FM, invited her for an "on-air" interview. In an interview with the News-Sun, following her dismissal on Idol, Dressel said, "It will be cool to see where it goes from here." When pondering her return to her hometown, she said, "It'll be fun getting to play for everybody back home because they've seen somebody from their town go to Hollywood and be on national television.

=== The Ellen DeGeneres Show ===
After her dismissal from season 9 of American Idol, the new co-host, Ellen DeGeneres, was quick to invite Dressel to her show, The Ellen DeGeneres Show. While judging on Idol, DeGeneres said to Dressel, "I love your voice and I love your confidence." On her show, DeGeneres said, "There's a girl named Shelby who I thought was really amazing," when she told her guests and viewers of Dressel's scheduled appearance. On February 23, 2010, Dressel appeared on The Ellen DeGeneres Show, once again singing Boston's "More Than a Feeling". When she finished the song, the audience gave her a standing ovation. She also wrote a new song, "Coming Back Around", based on her experiences in Hollywood. Dressel told DeGeneres that she was contemplating on trying out for American Idol next season, but wanted to let things cool down because of Idol's busy schedule process. When reflecting on her Idol experience, Dressel said,"Walking away from it, I've gained a lot of knowledge, like working with different people, being under that kind of pressure and being around cameras all the time. You have to be camera-ready all the time. Looking back, I definitely learned a lot."

=== Performances ===
Dressel performs her original songs, including: "Not Worth the Wait", "Hear It From Me", "The End", and "Coming Back Around." After her journey on season 9 of American Idol, Dressel performed in a welcome home concert on March 6, 2010 at Witham Chevrolet in Avon Park, Florida. After her return home concert, Dressel performed later that evening at Duffer's Sports Grille, in Sebring, Florida. Dressel also performed at the CTE Annual Hoedown, located at the Cracker Trail Elementary School in Sebring on March 25, 2010. Dressel was a scheduled performer at the Sebring International Raceway for the annual 12 Hours of Sebring. Dressel appeared with well-known country singer, Sammy Kershaw, and other acts, including Blackwater, the Dank Hanks Band, and One Night Rodeo; at the KIX Country Fest. The Country Fest, presented by WIKX 92.9FM Country, was held at the Charlotte County Fairgrounds in Port Charlotte, Florida on April 25, 2010. Besides performing her original songs, Dressel also performed the Lady Antebellum song, "American Honey", and the Carrie Underwood song, "Cowboy Casanova." The Moose Lodge in Sebring scheduled Dressel for numerous performances in April and May 2010. To commemorate South Florida Community College (SFCC) Class of 2010, Dressel sang a special song for the graduates on May 6, 2010 at the SFCC Theatre for the Performing Arts. The song, titled "Graduation Road", was written especially for the service by Doug Andrews and David Hale, staff members of the college. Dressel, along with Fran Cosmo (the former lead singer of Boston), and Gibson Cage appeared together at the Four Points Sheraton Château Élan, in Sebring on May 30, 2010. Dressel once again performed with the Dank Hanks Band on June 12, 2010, at Tanqueray's, in Orlando, Florida. Dressel made a return to Duffer's Sports Grille, in Sebring, on July 1, 2010, with a performance accompanied by her brother, Scott Dressel. Dressel, her brother Scott, and Dave McDonald were scheduled for future appearances at Duffer's Sports Grille throughout the Summer of 2010. The Main Street Tap Room in Avon Park, Florida hosted an event on August 28, 2010, featuring Dressel along with Noise After Nine; Dressel's bandmates, Ryan Cook and Matt Flowers are also members of the band Noise After Nine. Dressel is scheduled to perform at the 3rd Annual Oktoberfest in her hometown on October 16, 2010.

== Charity work ==
Dressel has performed at many events for a variety of charities. The Shelby Dressel Band put on a concert to raise money for an Avon Park Resident with Habitat for Humanity, raising $6,390 for the project. March 11, 2010, Dressel sang for a Meals on Wheels event at the Palms of Sebring. Dressel performed on March 26, 2010 at Avon Park High School, in Avon Park, Florida, for Relay For Life, where she sang the national anthem. On April 6, 2010, Dressel was at Highlands County Courthouse in Sebring, Florida for Heartland For Children, which promotes child abuse awareness. The event was in observation of child abuse awareness month. Dressel performed at an event benefiting the Boys and Girls Club of Highlands County on April 16, 2010. The Theatre for the Performing Arts at South Florida Community College held the 16th annual D.A.R.E. Day Celebration on April 27, 2010. D.A.R.E. stands for Drug Abuse Resistance Education. At the D.A.R.E. Celebration, Dressel performed Taylor Swift's song "You Belong With Me." The 5th grade spectators were welcomed by Dressel to sing along during the performance. Dressel also sang a few songs at a benefit on May 22, 2010, where proceeds were directed to help save birds effected by the April 20, 2010, oil well blowout, which is known as the Deepwater Horizon oil spill. She was welcomed to attend the function by an 8-year-old fan from Lake Placid, Florida, via email, and surprised the young fan during a radio interview with 106.9 The Bull, accepting the invitation. Dressel performed on June 25, 2010 for the Jacob Casey Foundation's 3rd Annual Casey Classic, which was held at the Golden Ocala Golf & Equestrian in Ocala, Florida. Dressel is scheduled to perform at a benefit concert on November 13, 2010, in Martinez, Georgia, to support the Augusta Christian's Senior Mission Trip.
