= Lake Glenada =

Lake in the state of Florida, United States

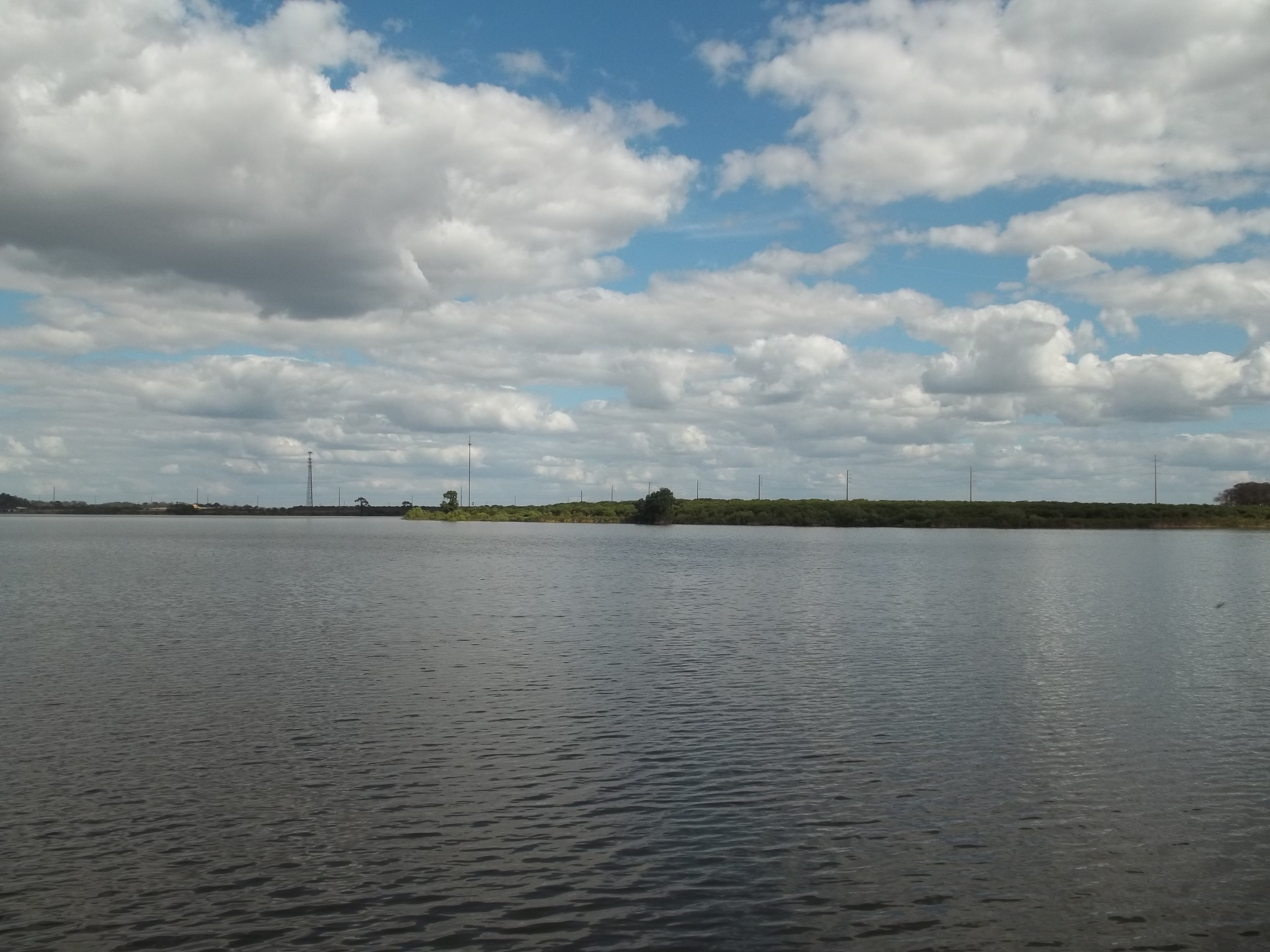
- Lake Glenada

- Location within Florida
- Location: Highlands County, Florida
- Coordinates: 27°33′49″N 81°30′22″W
- Type: lake
- Max. length: 0.75 miles (1.21 km)
- Max. width: 0.5 miles (0.80 km)
- Surface area: 197 acres (0.80 km^{2})
- Max. depth: 35 feet (11 m)

Lake Glenada is a natural lake in Highlands County, Florida, south of the city of Avon Park, Florida. It has an irregular shape and has a surface area of 197 acres (0.80 km^{2}). It is roughly 0.75 miles (1.21 km) long and about a 0.5 miles (0.80 km) wide. Its deepest part is about 35 feet (11 m). A bathymetric map produced by Florida Lakewatch shows it actually has three sections, one 35 feet (11 m) deep, another 25 feet (7.6 m) deep and still another 15 feet (4.6 m) deep.

This lake is bounded by the South Florida Community College campus on the north. Many buildings, including the Joseph E. Johnston Student Center, are on the lake's edge. On the west and southwest is US 27. On the south is Lake Glenada RV Resort.

Activities at the lake include fishing and boating. Lake Glenada RV Resort has their own boat ramp. A public boat ramp, fishing dock and shelter house is on the west side, just off US 27.
