= Little Bonnet Lake =

Lake in the state of Florida, United States

- Location within Florida Location within the United States
- Location: Highlands County, Florida
- Coordinates: 27°33′43″N 81°28′33″W
- Type: Natural freshwater lake
- Basin countries: United States
- Max. length: 0.5 mi (0.80 km)
- Max. width: 0.35 mi (0.56 km)
- Surface area: 74.3 acres (30 ha)
- Surface elevation: 95 ft (29 m)

Little Bonnet Lake, in Highlands County, Florida, is about 1,000 ft (305 m) west of Lake Letta and about twice as far south of Lake Lotela. This lake is bounded on the southwest by a rail line and on the southeast and part of the north side by citrus groves. Woods are on the east, part of the west and part of the north. A golf course borders Little Bonnet Lake on the northwest.

On the lake's northeast shore is a public boat ramp, that is reached by going through the area's golf course. A canal allows boats to travel east to Lake Letta and by a series of canals a number of area lakes may be accessed from Little Bonnet Lake. There are no public swimming beaches, but fishing is allowed. The HookandBullet.Com website says the lake contains blue catfish, gar and bowfin.
