= Lake Isis =

Lake in the state of Florida, United States

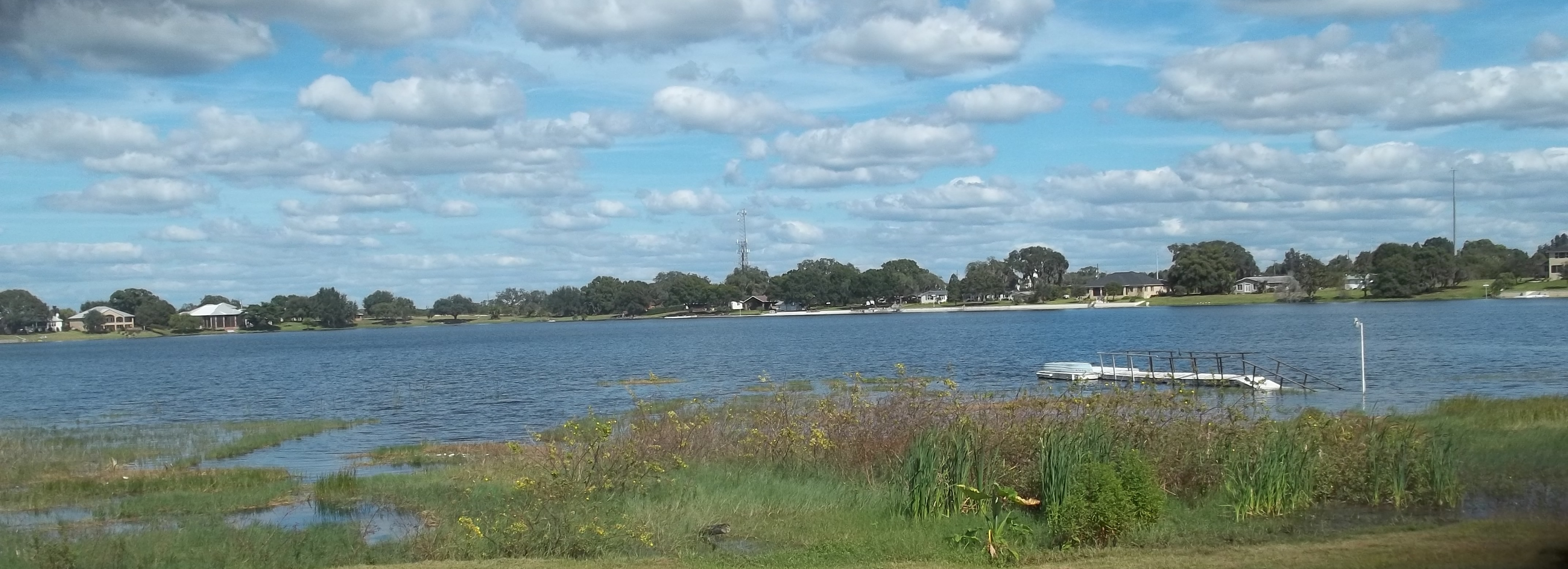

- Location within Florida
- Location: Avon Park, Highlands County, Florida, United States
- Coordinates: 27°36′45″N 81°30′36″W
- Surface area: 53 acres (21 ha)

Lake Isis is a 53-acre (210,000 m^{2}) rectangular lake in the northern part of Avon Park, Florida. It has very clear water. The lake is surrounded by white-sand beaches. The lake is a natural freshwater lake.

There is no public access to the lake, as all the property surrounding it is privately owned. Houses surround the west, north and east sides. The property along the entire south side is owned by Avon Park Holiness Camp, opened in 1939.

At one time Lake Isis was used as a scuba diving training site, and the property held by the church camp was used by area residents. Problems concerning insurance liability forced the camp to make its property off-limits to anyone not using the camp.
