= Derrick Crawford (defensive lineman) =

American football player (born 1979)

No. 98
- Position: Defensive lineman

Personal information
- Born: September 13, 1979 (age 47); Avon Park, Florida, U.S.
- Listed height: 6 ft 3 in (1.91 m)
- Listed weight: 290 lb (132 kg)

Career information
- High school: Avon Park (FL)
- College: Texas A&M–Commerce
- NFL draft: 2004: undrafted

Career history
- Cincinnati Bengals (2004–2005)*; Frankfurt Galaxy (2005); Orlando Predators (2005)*; Las Vegas Gladiators (2007); Miami Valley Silverbacks (2010); Cincinnati Commandos (2011)*; Columbus Lions (2013)
- * Offseason or practice squad member only

Awards and highlights
- 1st Team-All Lone Star Conference (2002); 1st Team-All Lone Star Conference (2003); Lone Star Conference Defensive Lineman of the Year (2003); 2nd Team All-CIFL (2010)

Career AFL statistics
- Tackles: 1
- Stats at ArenaFan.com

Derrick Crawford (born September 13, 1979) is an American former professional football defensive lineman. He attended Avon Park High School in Avon Park, Florida, where he was a standout at tight end being named the 1997 Florida District 12 3A Player of the Year. After a junior college career at Trinity Valley Community College, Crawford attended Texas A&M University-Commerce where he was a standout on defense, twice being named to All-Lone Star Conference Teams and named the conference's Defensive Lineman of the Year in 2003.

After his graduation, he signed as an undrafted free agent with the Cincinnati Bengals, spending the 2004 season as a member of their practice squad. He was re-signed by the Bengals in 2005, where they assigned him to the Frankfurt Galaxy of NFL Europe. After limited success as a professional in outdoor football, Crawford signed to play Arena football in 2006. He spent the offseason with the Orlando Predators, but didn't see playing time until 2007 when he signed with the Las Vegas Gladiators. Crawford would again attempt indoor football in 2010, when he signed with the Miami Valley Silverbacks. He achieved a 2nd Team All-CIFL honor, while helping the Silverbacks make their second playoff appearance in team history. He signed with the Cincinnati Commandos in 2011, but was let go before the season started.

== Early life ==
Crawford attended Avon Park High School in Avon Park, Florida, where he was a standout at tight end being named the 1997 Florida District 12 3A Player of the Year.

== College career ==
Crawford attended Trinity Valley Community College, upon his graduation from Avon Park.

Crawford was to attend the University of Central Florida in 2000, but he never played for the Golden Knights.

Crawford ended up at Texas A&M University–Commerce in 2001. He started at defensive tackle for the Lions as they posted a 7–4 record in 2001. Crawford helped the Lions 2–8 record in 2002, while on his way to a 2nd Team All-West Region Team by Daktronics, and a 2nd Team All-Lone Star Conference. His senior year, Crawford switched to defensive lineman, where he was named 1st Team All-Lone Star Conference in addition to winning the Conference's Defensive Lineman of the Year Award.

== Professional career ==
After graduation from Texas A&M-Commerce, Crawford signed as an undrafted free agent with the Cincinnati Bengals on April 27, 2004. He was released by the Bengals on September 1, only to be re-signed December 1 as a practice squad member. He re-signed with the Bengals in the offseason of 2005.

Crawford signed with the Orlando Predators of the Arena Football League for the 2005 season. But before he played with the Predators, he re-signed with the Bengals.

The Bengals assigned Crawford to the Frankfurt Galaxy of NFL Europe on February 15, 2005. For the season, Crawford recorded 3 sacks for a total of 24 yards lost.

Crawford played in his only arena football game in 2007 with the Las Vegas Gladiators. He recorded one game on the season.

Crawford returned to playing football professionally in 2010 when he joined the Miami Valley Silverbacks of the Continental Indoor Football League. Crawford started every game for the Silverbacks at nose tackle. Crawford finished the season with 18.5 tackles and was second on the team with 6 tackles for loss and 3 sacks. Crawford also scored two touchdowns for the Silverbacks on the season, with one coming on the final play of a 22–18 victory over the Wisconsin Wolfpack. Crawford recovered a missed field goal attempt and ran it into the end zone as time expired. Crawford was named second-team All-CIFL for his efforts during the 2010 season, helping the Silverbacks to a 4–6 record, and just their second playoff berth in franchise history.

In 2011, Crawford signed with the Cincinnati Commandos in the offseason, but never played with the Commandos in a regular season game.
