= Episcopal Church of the Redeemer (Avon Park, Florida) =

Episcopal Church of the Redeemer 910 W Martin Road Avon Park, Florida
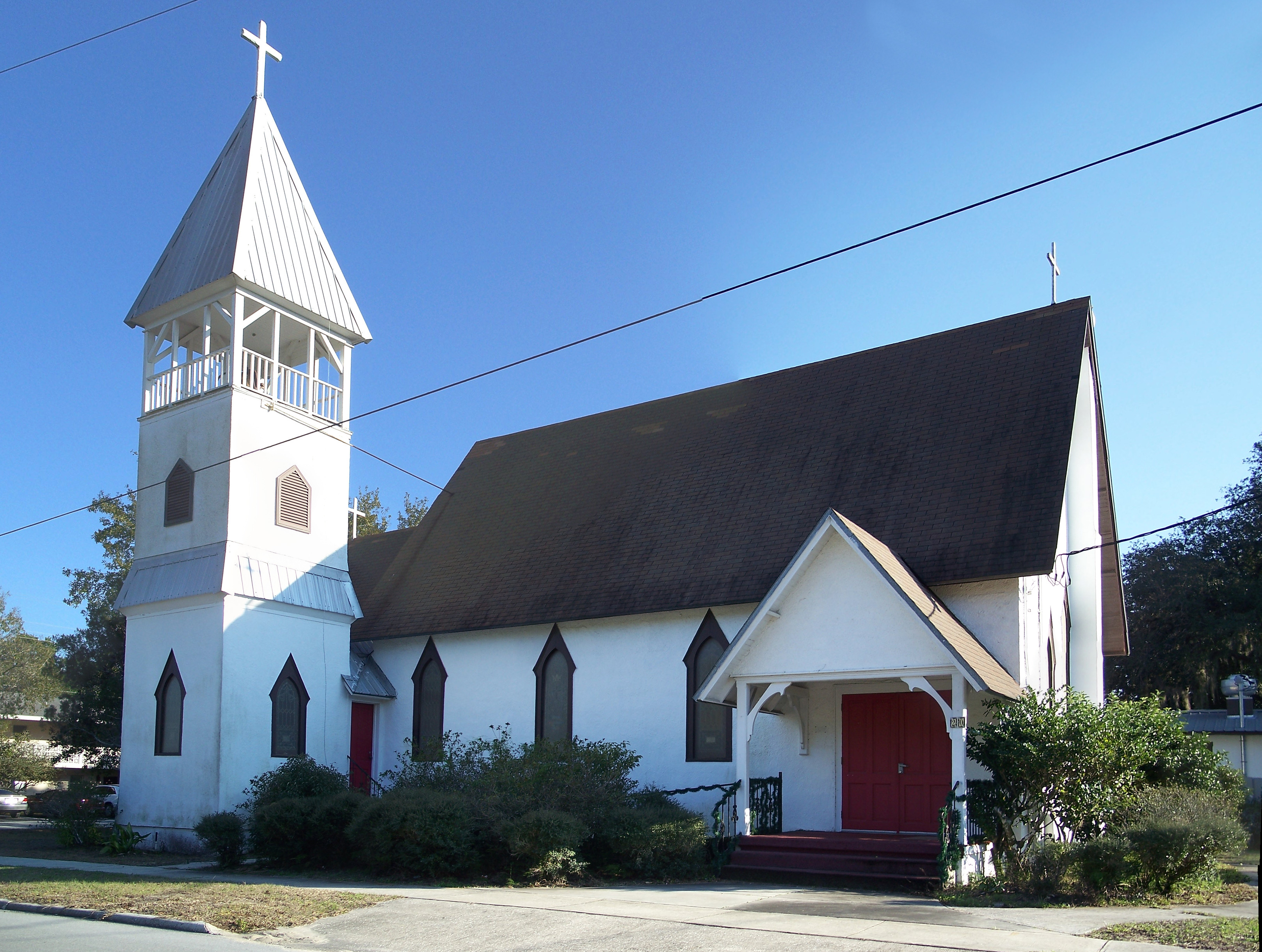
- The historic first church building, built in 1894.
- Episcopal Church of the Redeemer 910 W Martin Road Avon Park, Florida
- 27.599213°N 81.501495°W
- Denomination: Episcopal
- Website: http://www.redeemeravon.org/

History
- Dedication: Redeemer

Administration
- Province: IV
- Diocese: Central Florida; The Rt. Rev. John W, Howe, Bishop
- Parish: Redeemer

Clergy
- Rector: The Rev. Bill Yates

The former church building of Episcopal Church of the Redeemer, built in 1894, is an historic Carpenter Gothic church located at 20 East Pleasant Street in Avon Park, Florida, United States. In 1989, it was listed in A Guide to Florida's Historic Architecture, published by the University of Florida Press.

The church is an active parish in the Episcopal Diocese of Central Florida and now holds services at 910 West Martin Road.
