= Avon Park High School =

Location
- 700 E Main Street; Avon Park, Florida 33825; United States
- Coordinates: 27.596163°N 81.488686°W

Information
- Other name: APHS
- Type: Public high school
- School district: The School Board of Highlands County
- NCES School ID: 120084000906
- Principal: Karen Edsall
- Teaching staff: 48.00 (on an FTE basis)
- Grades: 9–12
- Enrollment: 946 (2023–2024)
- Student to teacher ratio: 19.71
- Colors: Red and white
- Mascot: Red Devil
- Nickname: Red Devils
- Website: www.highlands.k12.fl.us/~aph

Avon Park High School (APHS) is a public high school in Avon Park, Florida, United States. It is part of The School Board of Highlands County.

== Notable alumni ==
- Rickey Claitt – National Football League (NFL) player
- Derrick Crawford – NFL player
- Shelby Dressel – country singer-songwriter
- Tom Gordon – Major League Baseball (MLB) player
- Deanie Parrish – U.S. Army Air Force aviator for WASP during World War II
- Dee Strange-Gordon – MLB player
