= Lake Lillian (Florida) =

Lake in the state of Florida, United States

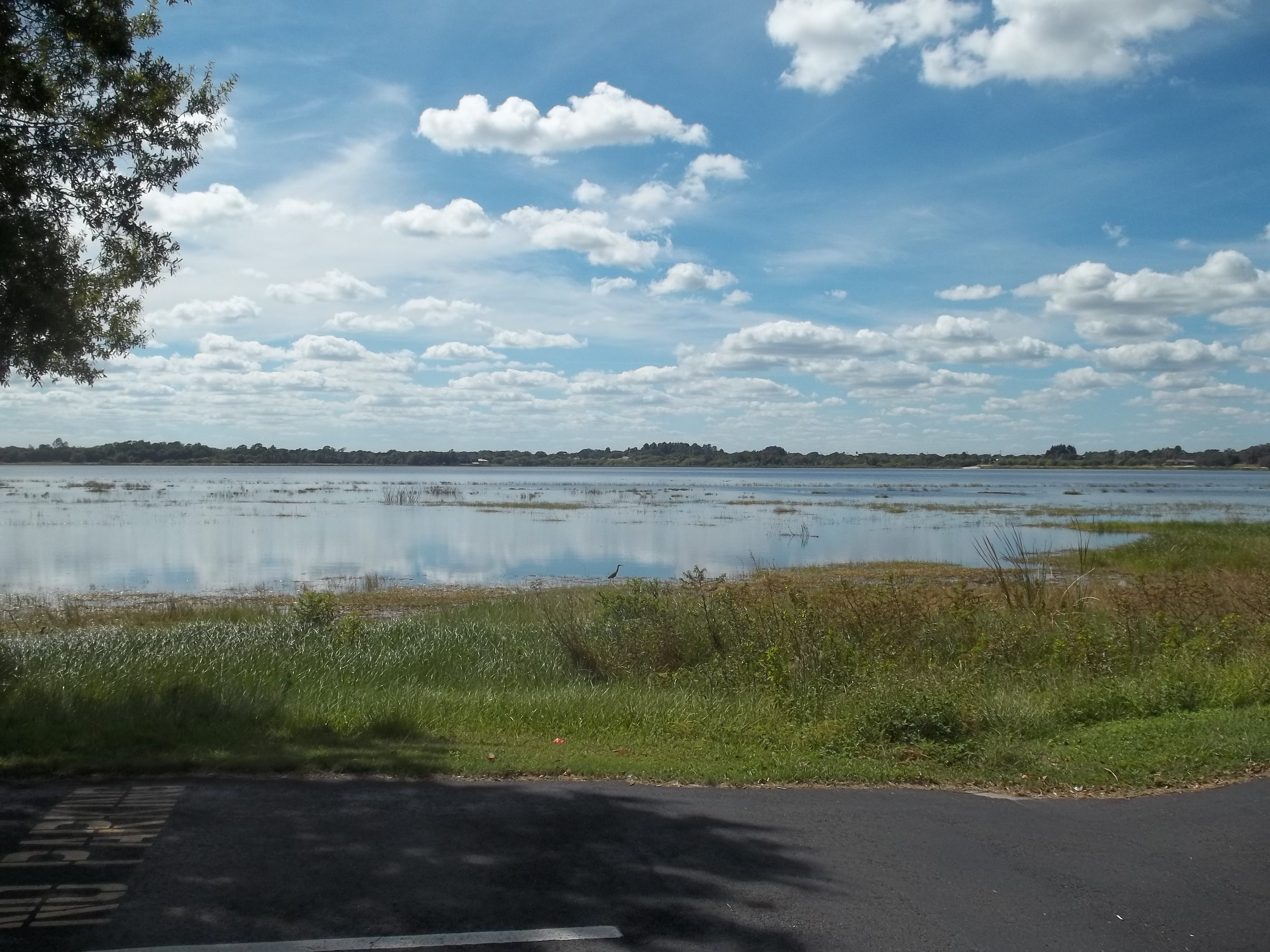

- Location within Florida Location within the United States
- Location: Highlands County, Florida
- Coordinates: 27°37′52″N 81°31′12″W
- Basin countries: United States
- Surface area: 36 acres (15 ha)

Lake Lillian is a 36-acre (150,000 m^{2}) freshwater lake in northern Highlands County, Florida. It is adjacent to the Avon Park Lakes Subdivision, north of the city of Avon Park. The slope of the lake drops quickly from the shoreline to a depth of about 45 feet (14 m).
