= Lake Adelaide =

Lake in the state of Florida, United States

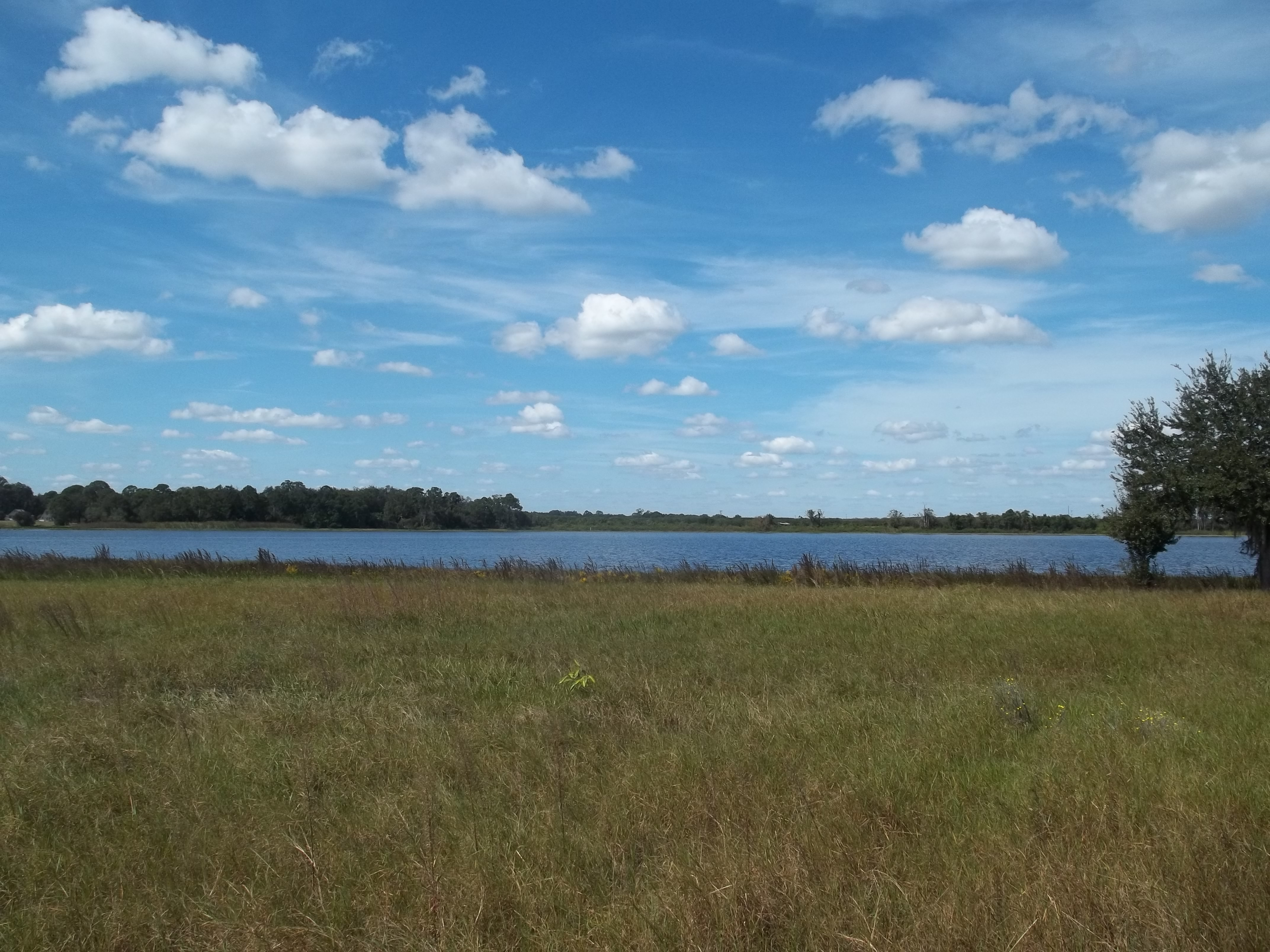

- Location within Florida Location within the United States
- Location: Highlands County, Florida
- Coordinates: 27°38.4′N 81°31.9′W
- Basin countries: United States
- Surface area: 109 acres (44 ha)
- Average depth: 7 ft (2.1 m)
- Max. depth: 20 ft (6.1 m)

Lake Adelaide is a 109-acre (0.44 km^{2}) lake located in the northwest corner of Highlands County, Florida. It is bounded on the north by Holiday Ranch RV Park, which borders the Polk-Highlands County line, on the east by Adelaide Shores RV Resort and on the west by the Avon Park Lakes residential subdivision. Lake Adelaide is two miles (3 km) north of the town of Avon Park, Florida.

Holiday Ranch RV Park and Adelaide Shores RV Resort are private developments with boat access to the lake. A public boat ramp is located on the Avon Park Lakes side. Both RV parks have sites available for mobile homes and RVs. Adelaide Shores, a retirement community, has 400 sites, a club house, a large heated swimming pool, a boat dock, a walking trail on the lake shore and laundry facilities.

Lake Adelaide is about twenty feet deep at its deepest spot and has an average depth of seven feet.
