= Lake Brentwood =

Lake in the state of Florida, United States

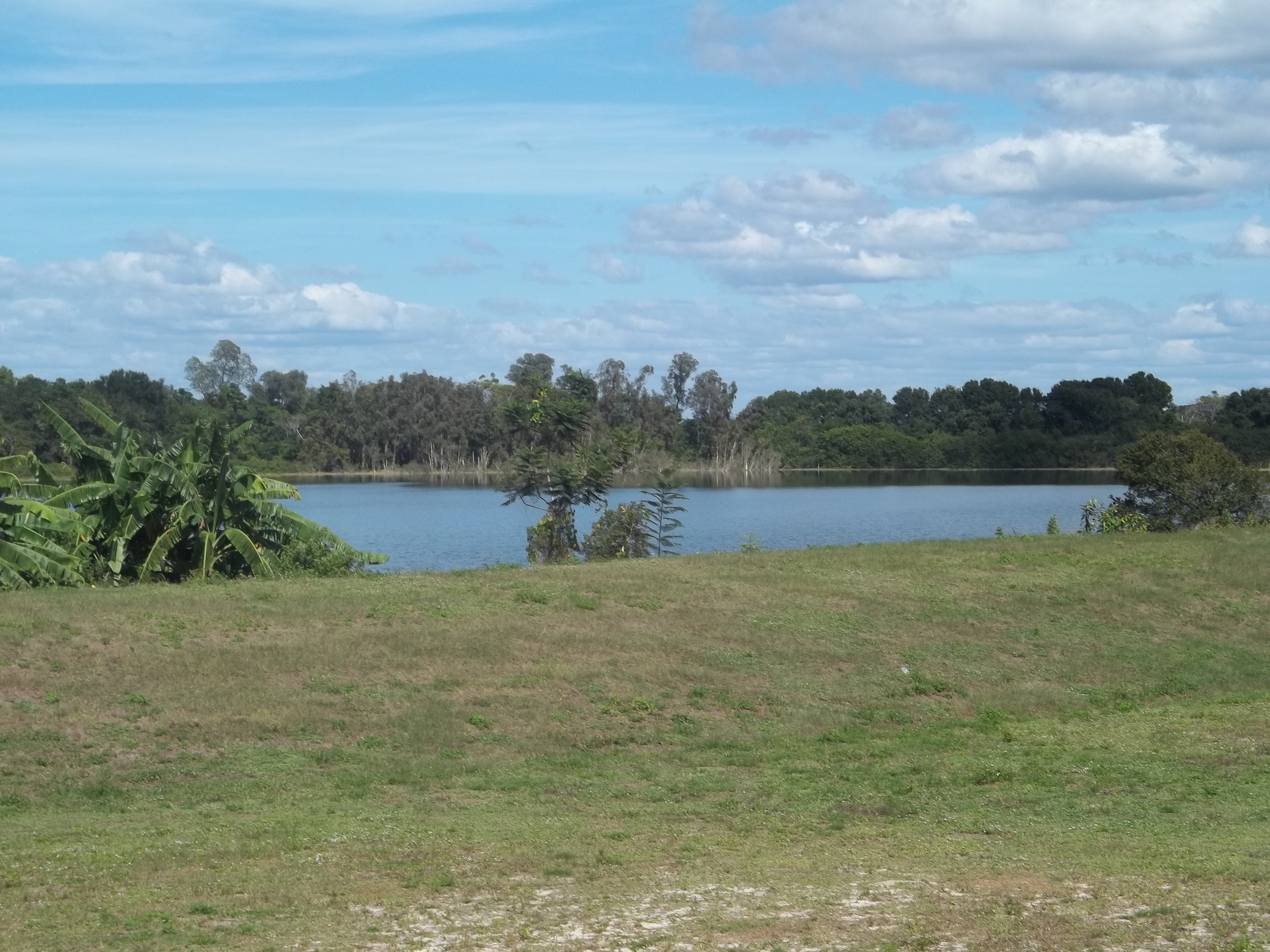
- Lake Brentwood

- Location within Florida
- Location: Highlands County, Florida
- Coordinates: 27°37′19″N 81°30′40″W
- Type: lake
- Surface area: 60 acres (240,000 m^{2})

Lake Brentwood is in northern Highlands County, Florida. The city of Avon Park, Florida, is just to the south and east of the lake. On the south end is Brentwood Mobile Court, which has a private boat ramp. Just south of Brentwood Mobile Court is Stryker Road. On the southwest is Lake Brentwood Plaza, a strip mall. On the west shore is Lake Brentwood Motel, which also has a private boat ramp. From the motel property guests may fish and rent boats for use on the lake.

Just to the north of Lake Brentwood Motel is the Sharon Motel, no access to the lake. To the east is a railroad track and Lake Brentwood Road. There is no public access to Lake Brentwood. All access must be obtained from one of the above entities or a person owning land on the lake.

This lake is approximately 60 acres (240,000 m^{2}) in area and is roughly shaped like a kidney bean.
