= Lake Lotela =

Lake in the state of Florida, United States

- Location within Florida
- Location: Highlands County, Florida
- Coordinates: 27°34′36″N 81°28′56″W
- Type: Freshwater lake
- Surface area: 802-acre (3,250,000 m^{2})
- Max. depth: 36 feet (11 m)

Lake Lotela is a natural freshwater lake in Highlands County, Florida. It is one of the county's larger lakes, with a surface area of 802-acre (3,250,000 m^{2}). Its maximum depth is 36 feet (11 m). It is at the southeast corner of Avon Park, Florida. Lake Lotela's largest part is circular. A circular cove is on its northwest and another circular cove is on its west side. The lake is approximately 1 mile (1.6 km) across.

Lake Lotela is almost entirely surrounded by houses. While most appear to be occupied by middle income or affluent families, some of those on the two coves are somewhat dilapidated. A golf course is across the road from the lake on its east and south sides.

On the east side, a building was built in 1926 to serve as the clubhouse of the Pinecrest Country Club. It became the Pinecrest Hotel (see Old Pinecrest Hotel). Additions were added in 1936 and 1950. After serving as a hotel, the building became a girls' boarding school, the Highlands School. After that, it was sold in 1994 and became the Maharishi School of Vedic Science, which eventually closed. In 2000 the building was added to the National Register of Historic Places. By the time a series of hurricanes caused damage in 2004 and 2005, the old hotel was abandoned. It was torn down in 2006 or 2007.

Lake Lotela has no public swimming beaches. However, fishing is allowed and the lake has two public boat ramps, one on the south side, on Lake Lotela Drive, and the other is in Avon Park, at the east end of Bohland Street.
