= Lake Byrd =

Lake in Florida, US

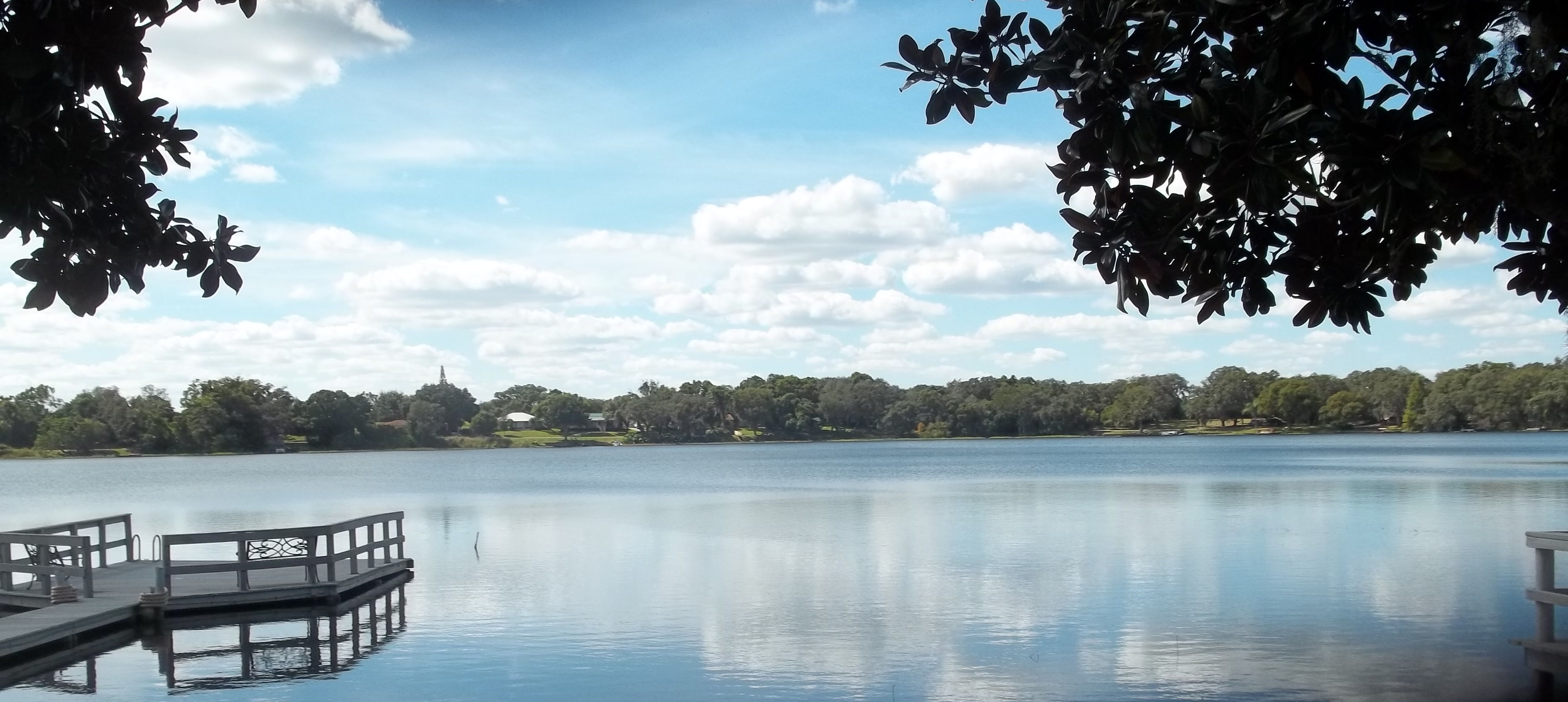
- Lake Byrd

- Location within Florida
- Location: Highlands County, Florida
- Coordinates: 27°37′19″N 81°31′04″W
- Type: lake
- Max. length: 2,500 feet (760 m)
- Max. width: 1,200 feet (370 m)
- Max. depth: 32 feet (9.8 m)

Lake Byrd is a small natural lake in northwest Highlands County, Florida. It is approximately 1,200 feet (370 m) wide east to west and approximately 2,500 feet (760 m) long north to south. Its maximum depth is about 32 feet (9.8 m). The lake may be admired from the public roads around it. A private boat ramp and private park with a shelter house and picnic tables are on the northeast corner. The residents consider the lake to be private property and do not allow visitors to use it.

Lake Byrd Boulevard completely surrounds the lake. Houses line the east, south and west sides of Lake Byrd Boulevard opposite Lake Byrd. Many of the houses on the west side date back perhaps to the 1920s. Almost all the houses have private boat docks or ramps on the lake's shore. Directly to the east is U.S. Highway 27 and a fourth mile to the south is Avon Park, Florida and Stryker Boulevard. To the north is the vacant Lake Byrd Shores housing development. To the west and south are citrus orchards and pastureland.

In 1919 the Lake Byrd Lodge was built to accommodate guests looking to buy property in the area. The lodge was a large three-story wooden structure on the north shore of Lake Byrd. During World War II, pilots undergoing flight training were housed in the lodge. At the War's end, the Florida Congregational Christian Conference bought the lodge to use as a church camp. The lodge was used as a camp and retreat until 2000, when the Conference decided it could no longer keep up with the costs of repairs to the building.

The lodge sat vacant for several years and the entire north area of the lake shore was purchased and renamed Lake Byrd Shores. Lake Byrd Shores was to be an upscale housing development. The old lodge was torn down, Lake Byrd Boulevard on the north shore was rebuilt and residential street to the north was built. The lots were all cleared and graded, but only one house was built before the real estate meltdown, starting in 2007.
