= WWMA-LP =

- Avon Park, Florida; United States
- Frequency: 107.9 MHz

Ownership
- Owner: Highlands County Chapter of ASI

History
- First air date: 2005-09-30

Technical information
- Licensing authority: FCC
- Facility ID: 135055
- Class: L1
- ERP: 100 watts
- HAAT: 20.0 meters (65.6 ft)
- Transmitter coordinates: 27°37′41.11835″N 81°31′23.27198″W

Links
- Public license information: LMS

WWMA-LP (107.9 FM) is a radio station licensed to Avon Park, Florida, United States. The station is currently owned by Highlands County Chapter of ASI, and carries some local programming as well as programming rebroadcast from Radio 74 Internationale.
