= Lake Anoka =

Lake in the state of Florida, United States

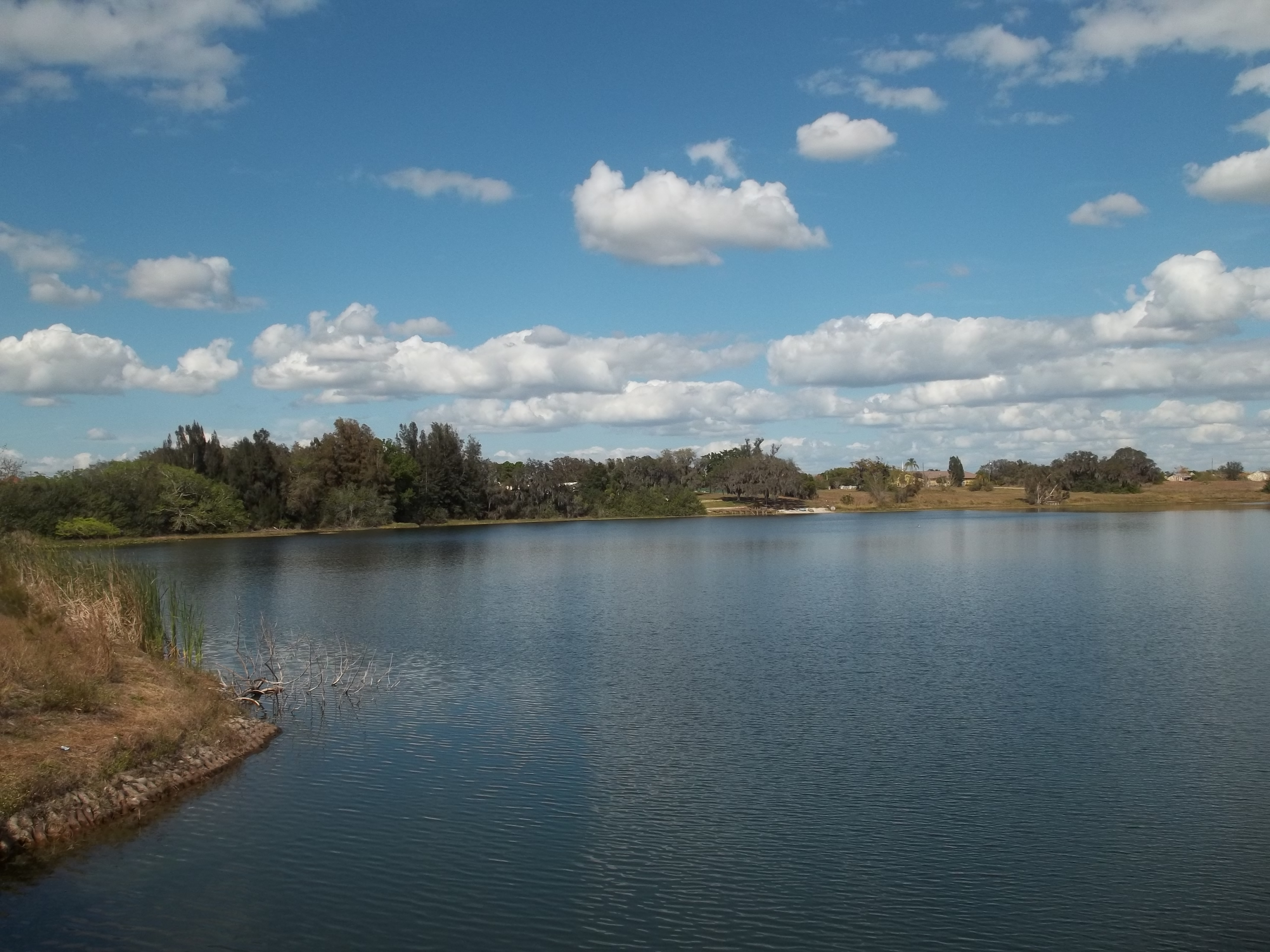
- Lake Anoka

- Location within Florida
- Location: Highlands County, Florida
- Coordinates: 27°34′51.268″N 81°30′44.364″W
- Type: lake

Lake Anoka is a natural, almost circular lake just south of the city limits of Avon Park, Florida. The west side of the lake was filled in so US 27 could pass through that area. Lake Anoka has a surface area of forty-eight acres and has a maximum depth of fifty-nine feet. There is no public access for boating on this lake, but fishing is allowed near US 27.

The lake is bounded by a citrus orchard on the east and US 27 on the west. There are several houses on both the north and south sides of the lake.
