= Lake Verona =

Lake in Avon Park, Florida, United States

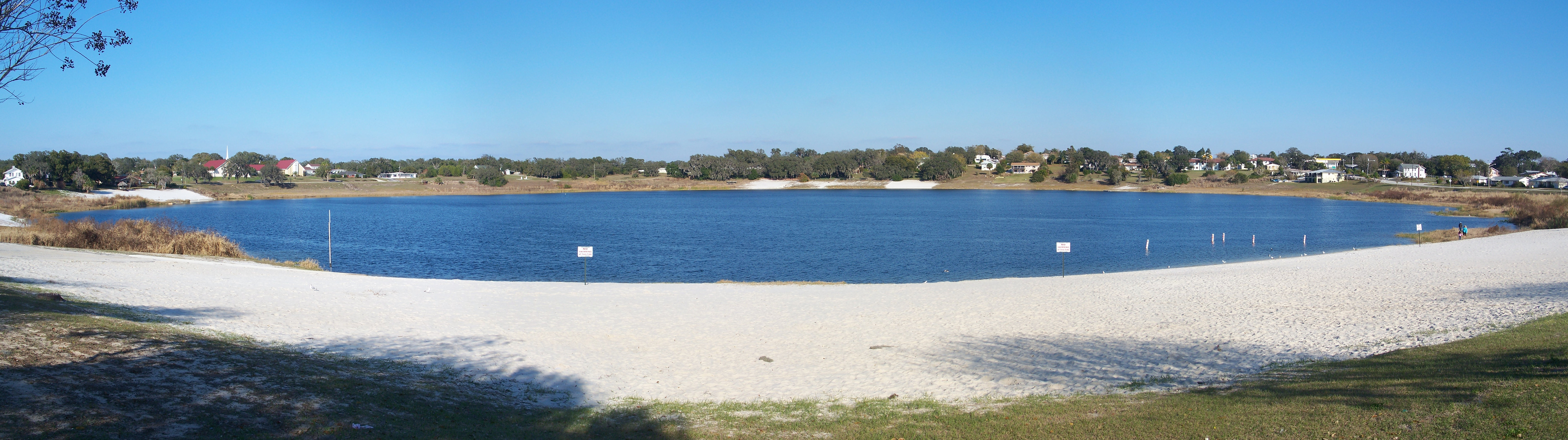

- Location within Florida Location within the United States
- Location: Avon Park, Florida
- Coordinates: 27°35′53″N 81°29′49″W
- Basin countries: United States
- Surface area: 41 acres (17 ha)
- Max. depth: 80 ft (24 m)
- Surface elevation: 112 ft (34 m)

Lake Verona is located at the east end of Main Street (SR-64 E) within the city limits of Avon Park, Florida. While the lake covers only 41 acres (17 ha), it is considered the deepest natural lake in peninsular Florida (at ~80 feet), with very steep banks, and a rapid drop-off.

A boat ramp and turn-around exists where Church Street terminates at the lake shore adjacent to historic Donaldson Park. Picnic tables, shelter-houses, bathrooms, and barbecue grills are available. A broad white sand beach and public swimming area are present, although the lake is highly dangerous due to its depth and steep drop off. Life guards were once on duty, but such public safety measures are no longer present.

Lake Verona is an entirely natural, land-locked, "collapse sink hole" lake, with white-sand beaches and clear water. It is the prominent feature of the City of Avon Park.

The lake is one of the oldest lakes in the United States, estimated at 33,000+ years old. This has been established through radio-carbon dating of core samples from the bottom of the lake. Lake Tulane, its "sister" lake, located a short distance south, is dated at 60,000+ years old and, depending on the water levels at any given time, sometimes alternates title as the deepest lake in peninsular Florida.
