= Lake Lelia =

Lake in the state of Florida, United States

- Location within Florida
- Location: Highlands County, Florida
- Coordinates: 27°34′24″N 81°30′15″W
- Type: lake
- Max. length: 0.5 miles (0.80 km)
- Max. width: 0.25 miles (0.40 km)
- Surface area: 161.97-acre (655,500 m^{2})

Lake Lelia is a natural fresh water lake on the south side of Avon Park, Florida. The northeast section of the lake is within the Avon Park city limits. The lake is longest east to west, being approximately 0.5 miles (0.80 km) long. Its north-to-south width averages at 0.25 miles (0.40 km) wide. The Florida Atlas of Lakes lists Lake Lelia as having a surface area of 161.97-acre (655,500 m^{2}). This lake is bounded by South Florida Community College at its south shore. A few houses dot its shore, but is it mostly bounded by woods and citrus trees. On the northeast two sets of railroad tracks are just off its shore.

On its south side a pier built from the college Citrus Center extends into the lake. Visitors may walk along part of its length, but are not allowed to fish from it. A public boat ramp is just off Martin Road on the lake's west side. The lake may be fished, but no swimming is allowed.
