= Lake Tulane =

Lake in the state of Florida, United States

- Location within Florida
- Location: Highlands County, Florida
- Coordinates: 27°35′10″N 81°30′13″W
- Type: lake
- Surface area: 88 acres (36 ha)
- Max. depth: 70 ft (21 m)
- Surface elevation: 112 ft (34 m)

Lake Tulane in Florida is one of numerous natural lakes that occupy sinkholes, which were formed by the dissolution of Eocene limestone at depth. Lake Wales Ridge, within which Tulane Lake lies, is a linear highland that consists of unconsolidated quartz sands of the Pliocene Cypresshead Formation. These sands rest upon impermeable Miocene sediments that overlie limestone, which was dissolved by groundwater and collapsed to form Tulane Lake. It is oblong in shape, has a surface area of 88 ares (95,000 sq ft) and has a maximum depth of 70 feet (21 m). It is surrounded by residential housing in Avon Park, Florida.

The organic-rich sediments, which underlie the bottom of Lake Tulane, provide one of the few records of ancient climates within eastern North America that extends beyond the late glacial period (~ 15,000 cal years BP). Cores from the bottom of Lake Tulane have yielded a record of paleoclimates and paleovegetation, which date back to before 60,000 BP. The Pre-Holocene pollen record shows alternating periods of Pinus (pine)-dominated and Quercus-Ambrosia (oak-ragweed)-dominated vegetation. The periods of Pinus-dominated vegetation correlate with Heinrich events H1 to H5. This correlation demonstrates a linkage between continental and oceanic climate events. The periods of Pinus-dominated vegetation are interpreted to represent periods of relatively high precipitation associated with relatively warm waters in the Gulf of Mexico. The periods of Quercus-Ambrosia-dominated vegetation are interpreted to represent period of arid climate associated with periods when the Gulf of Mexico and the North Atlantic Ocean were cooled by glacial meltwaters.

Lake Tulane is used for swimming, boating and fishing. There is a public boat ramp on its west side and a public swimming beach on its south side. A person leaving a comment in the Fishing Works website rated the fishing at the lake as excellent.
