= Deanie Parrish =

American aviator (1922–2022)

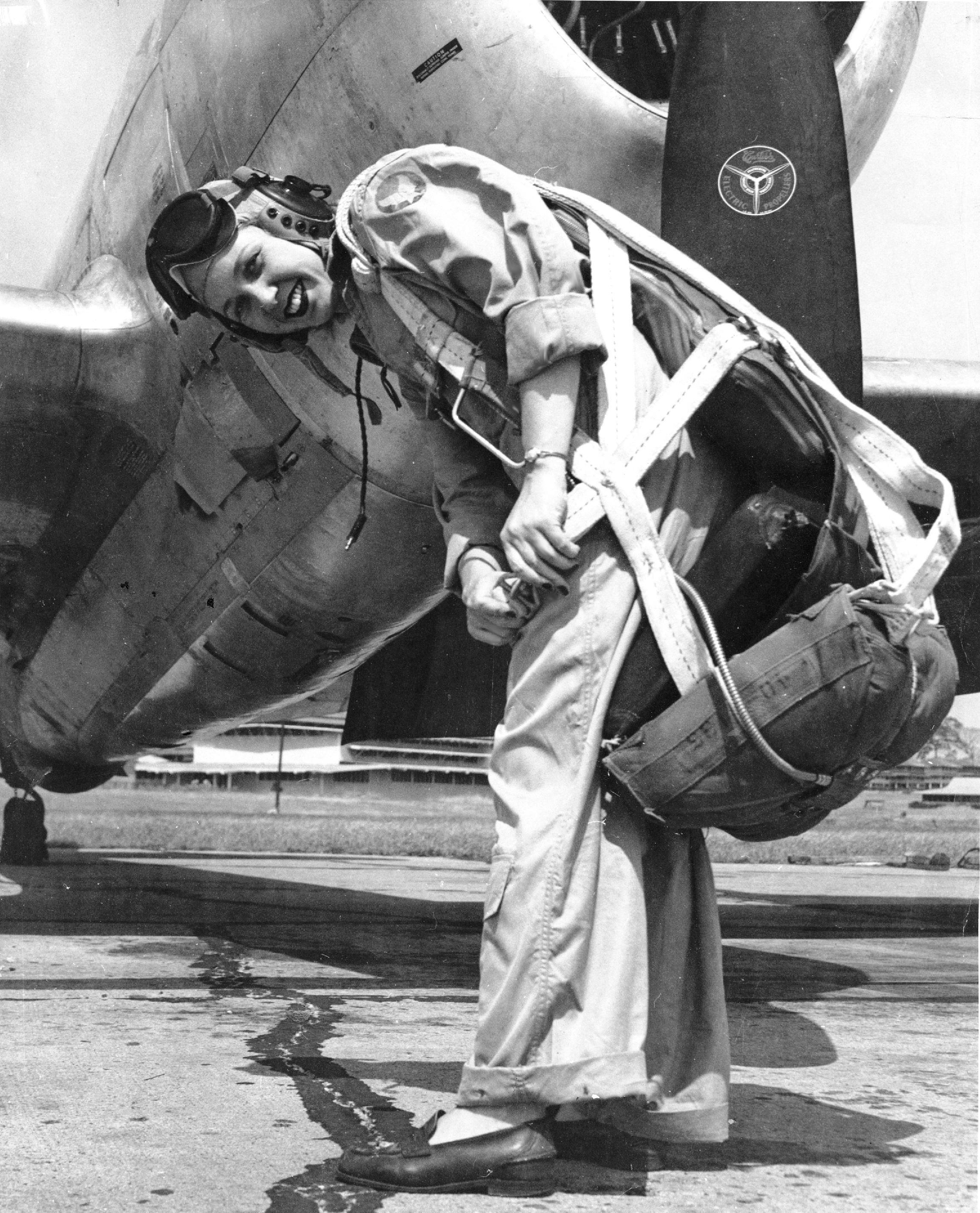
- Parrish as a WASP on the flightline at Tyndall Air Force Base in the early 1940s
- Born: February 25, 1922; Avon Park, Florida, U.S.
- Died: February 24, 2022 (aged 99)
- Occupation: Women Airforce Service Pilot
- Years active: WASP 1940–1944

Marie Odean Bishop Parrish (February 25, 1922 – February 24, 2022), known as Deanie Parrish (sometimes spelt as Parish) was a US air force pilot who served as a WASP pilot during WWII. She was known for being one of Florida's first female air force aviators. She joined the air force aged 21, and after earning her wings, worked as an engineering test pilot at Greenville air force base. She later retrained to tow target planes during training exercises.

She married a career USAF pilot and had two daughters. She spent much of her life after the WASP's were disbanded as a hospital volunteer. In later life she worked to commemorate the efforts made by female pilots towards the war effort during WWII.

Her work directly resulted in the Women Airforce Service Pilots being awarded a Congressional Gold Medal in 2010, she accepted the award on behalf of the 1074 WASP aviators. Deanie was inducted into the WAI Pioneer Hall of Fame in 2015. Parish has been highly influential in the efforts to get the work of the WASP's recognised, and has organised several websites, written books and created initiatives to achieve this.

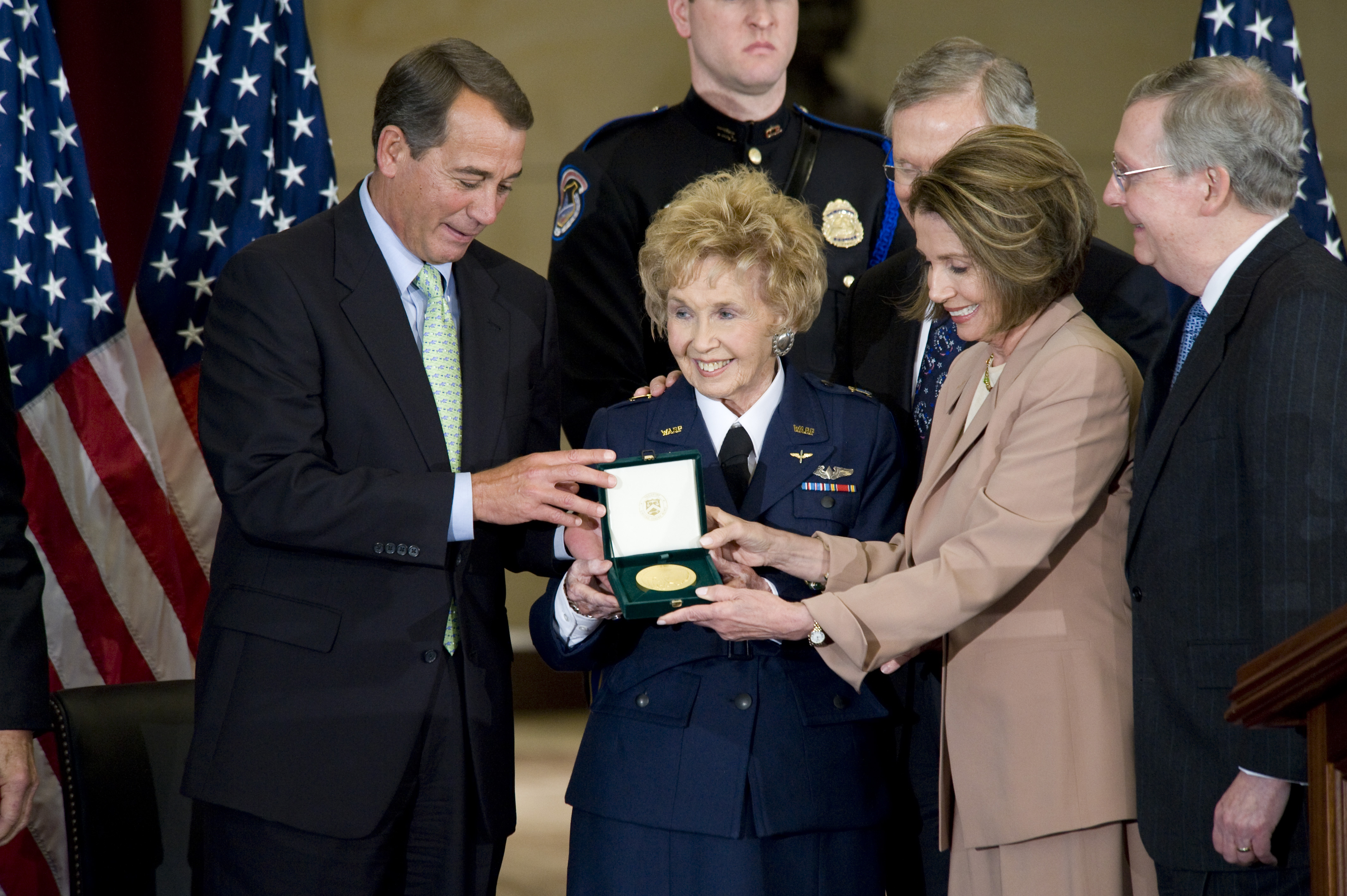
Parish receiving the Congressional Gold Medal on behalf of the WASP's on 10 March 2010

The medal ceremony on capitol hill was attended by over 200 surviving WASP personnel. The award comes 65 years after the service was disbanded. The WASP's (known as "fly girls") were volunteer pilots who flew military aircraft around America during the second world war to allow more USAF pilots to fly frontline missions in Europe, they were recognised as a military group in 1977, and their contribution to the war effort recognised with the Congressional Gold Medal in 2010. The medal was presented by congressional officials and accepted by Deanie Parish on behalf of the WASP's.

Parrish died on February 24, 2022, one day before her 100th birthday.
