= Florida Lakewatch =

Volunteer water monitoring program

Coordinates: 29.7240°N 82.4140°W

Agency overview
- Formed: 1986
- Headquarters: Fisheries and Aquatic Sciences, University of Florida, 7922 NW 71st Street, Gainesville, Florida (the coordinates of the headquarters are above)
- Agency executive: J. E. Canfield, Project director
- Website: lakewatch.ifas.ufl.edu

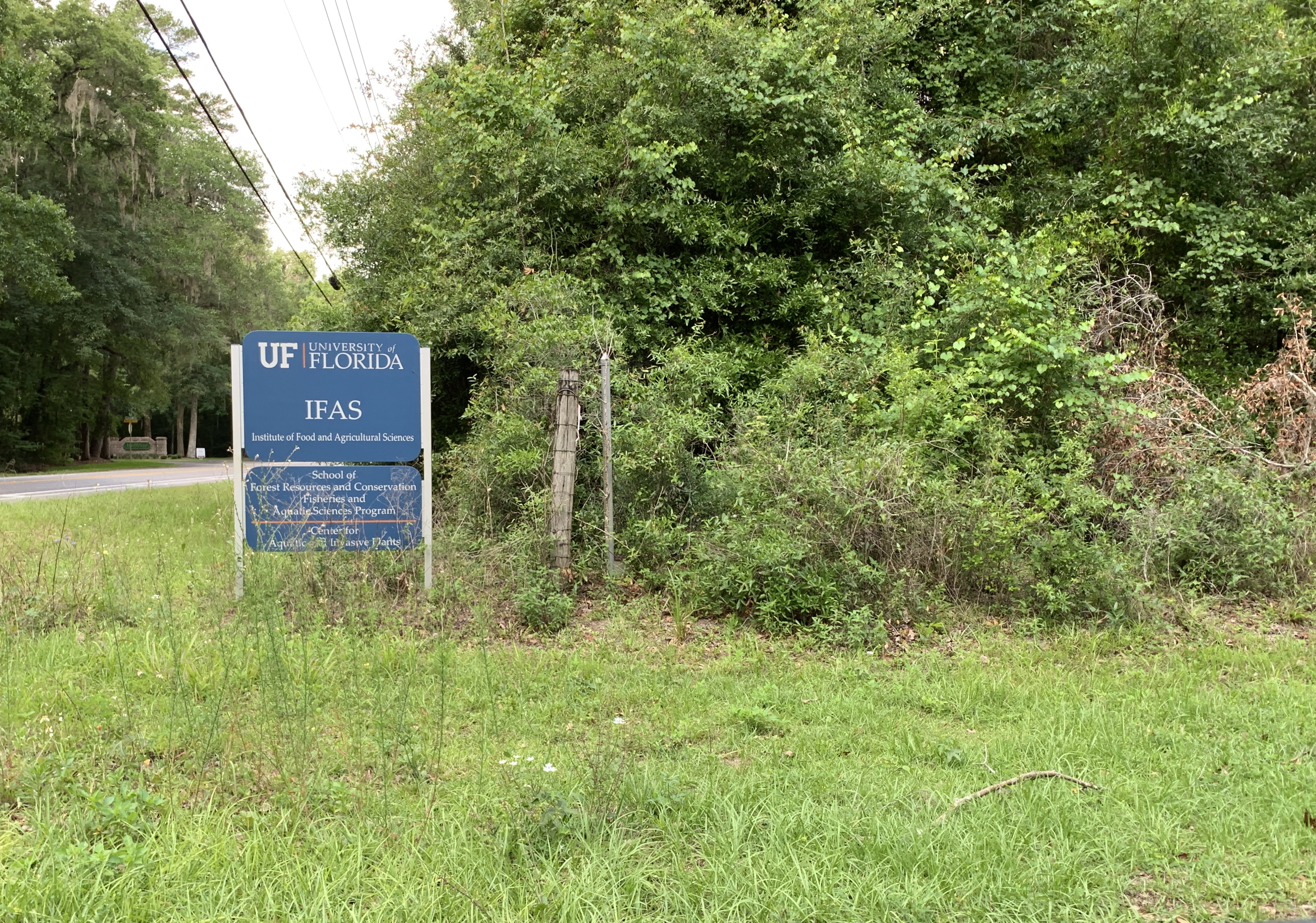
Sign near Florida Lakewatch headquarters

Florida Lakewatch, established in 1986, is a volunteer water-monitoring program coordinated through the University of Florida. This project is headquartered at Gainesville, Florida, within the campus of the University of Florida. Through its history, Florida Lakewatch has obtained funding from a number of sources, but it is currently mostly funded by the state of Florida.

== Volunteer involvement ==
There are more than 5,400 lakes in Florida and a number of rivers. The Florida Lakewatch program provides support to citizens interested in monitoring lakes and providing data they collect for the program. The Department of Fisheries and Aquatic Sciences of the University of Florida provides faculty, staff and laboratory support to more than 1,800 volunteers. Reliable water chemistry data has been collected from more than 1,000 lakes from at least fifty counties. Florida Lakewatch works directly with citizens who live on or use lakes, rivers or waterways and are willing to participate in a long-term monitoring effort. These volunteers must have access to a boat, since much of the data collection must be done away from lake shores. Florida Lakewatch has at least basic information on 5,420 lakes in Florida.

== Services provided ==
Florida Lakewatch provides a variety of items useful to those interested in lakes. These include (all available on the Florida Lakewatch website):

- Bathymetric maps of approximately 320 Florida lakes
- Various types of data grouped by subject matter
- An online library of almost all the project's newsletters
- Information about all the other Florida Lakewatch publications
- Information about periodic volunteer meetings at the county level

== Links to Florida online water atlases ==
The Florida Lakewatch website contains links to the Florida Atlas of Lakes, produced by the University of South Florida's Water Atlas program. This program is supported by Florida Lakewatch and the Florida Lake Management Society. Through the Florida Atlas of Lakes seven county water atlases can be accessed. These are: the Polk County Water Atlas, the Hillsborough Water Atlas, the Pinellas County Water Atlas, the Sarasota County Water Atlas, the Seminole County Water Atlas, the Orange County Water Atlas, the Manatee County Water Atlas.
