= Avon Park Historic District =

Historic district in Florida, United States

- U.S. National Register of Historic Places
- U.S. Historic district
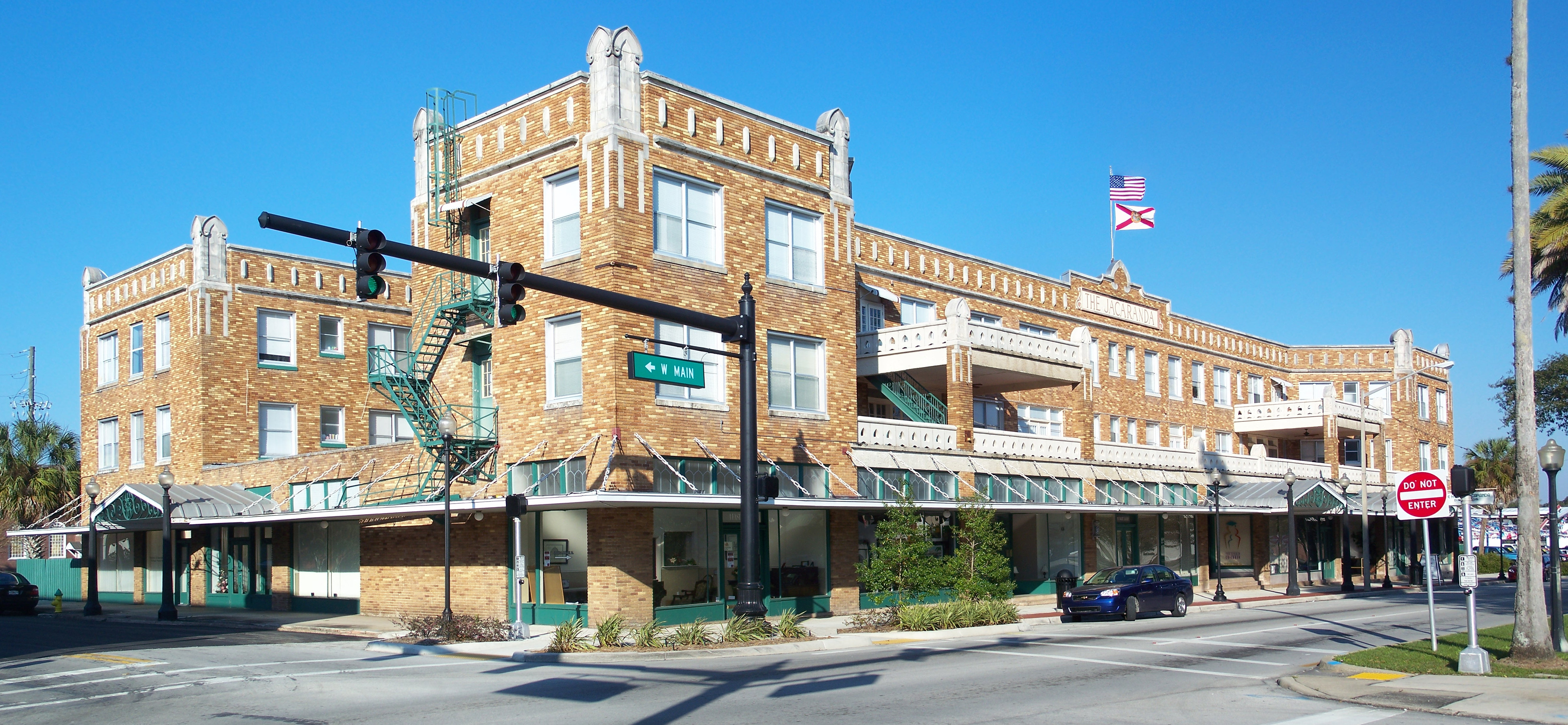
- Jacaranda Hotel, in the district

- Location within Florida Location within the United States
- Location: Avon Park, Florida
- Coordinates: 27°35′44″N 81°30′23″W
- Area: 25 acres (0.10 km^{2})
- Architectural style: Art Deco, Classical Revival
- NRHP reference No.: 90000486
- Added to NRHP: March 22, 1990

The Avon Park Historic District is a U.S. historic district in Avon Park, Florida. It runs along Main Street from South Delaney Avenue to U.S. 27, encompasses approximately 25 acres (0.10 km^{2}), and contains 13 historic buildings and 1 object. On March 22, 1990, it was added to the U.S. National Register of Historic Places.
