= Union Congregational Church (Avon Park, Florida) =

Union Church
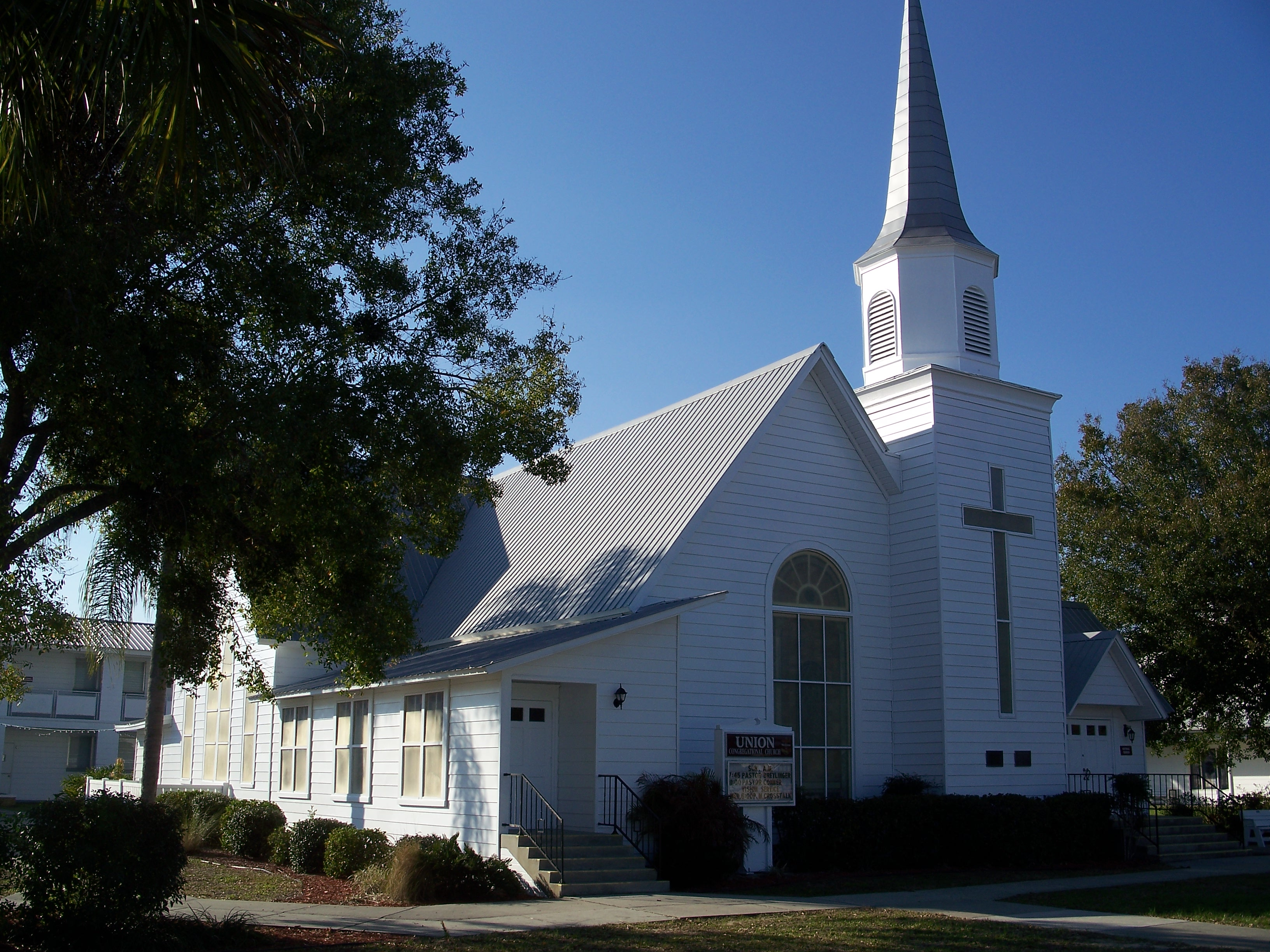
- Interactive map of the Union Church area

General information
- Location: 106 N. Butler Ave., Avon Park, Florida, United States
- Coordinates: 27.59746°N 81.50302°W
- Construction started: 1890
- Completed: 1892
- Client: Union Church

Technical details
- Structural system: wooden

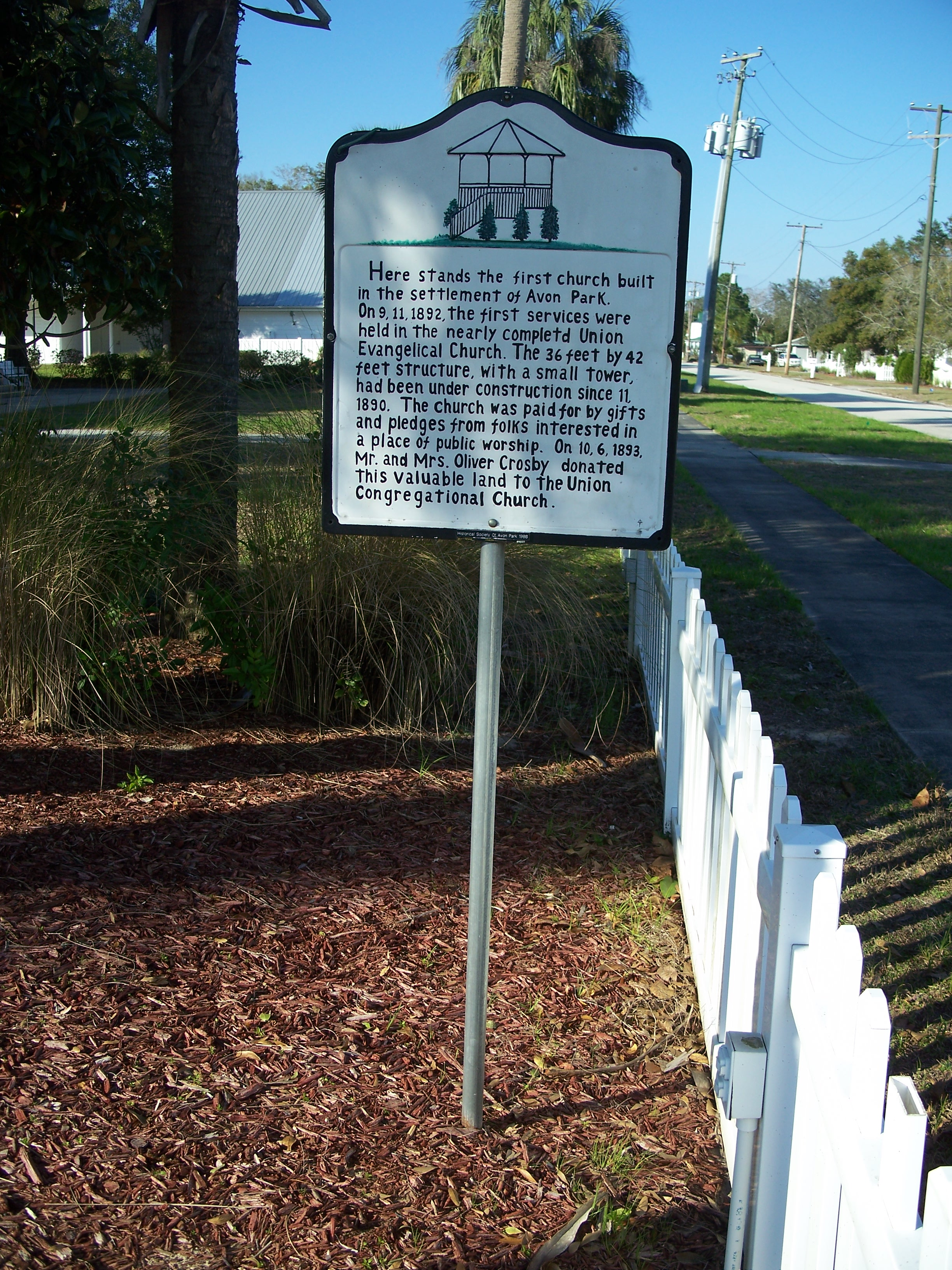

The Union Church, also known as Union Congregational Church, is a historic United Church of Christ church building located in Avon Park, Florida.

Construction began in 1890 and the first services were held in the not-quite-completed structure on September 11, 1892. The church was built on land donated by the founder of Avon Park, Oliver Martin Crosby, and his wife. Later the original crenellated bell tower was replaced with a steeple. In 1989, the church was listed as in A Guide to Florida's Historic Architecture, published by the University of Florida Press."

Union Church is an active congregation. The church property extends through to Jim Rodgers Avenue. Bill Breylinger has been the senior pastor for over 25 years.
