= Rickey Claitt =

American football player (born 1957)

No. 35
- Position: Running back

Personal information
- Born: April 12, 1957 (age 69); Sylvester, Georgia
- Listed height: 5 ft 10 in (1.78 m)
- Listed weight: 206 lb (93 kg)

Career information
- High school: Avon Park
- College: Bethune–Cookman
- NFL draft: 1980: undrafted

Career history
- Washington Redskins (1980–1981); Washington Federals/Orlando Renegades (1983–1985)

Awards and highlights
- Super Bowl champion (XVII)
- Stats at Pro Football Reference

Rickey Claitt (born April 12, 1957) is an American former professional football player who was a running back in the National Football League (NFL) for the Washington Redskins in 1980 and 1981. He played college football for the Bethune–Cookman Wildcats.
