= Tierra Verde, Florida =

- Census-designated place
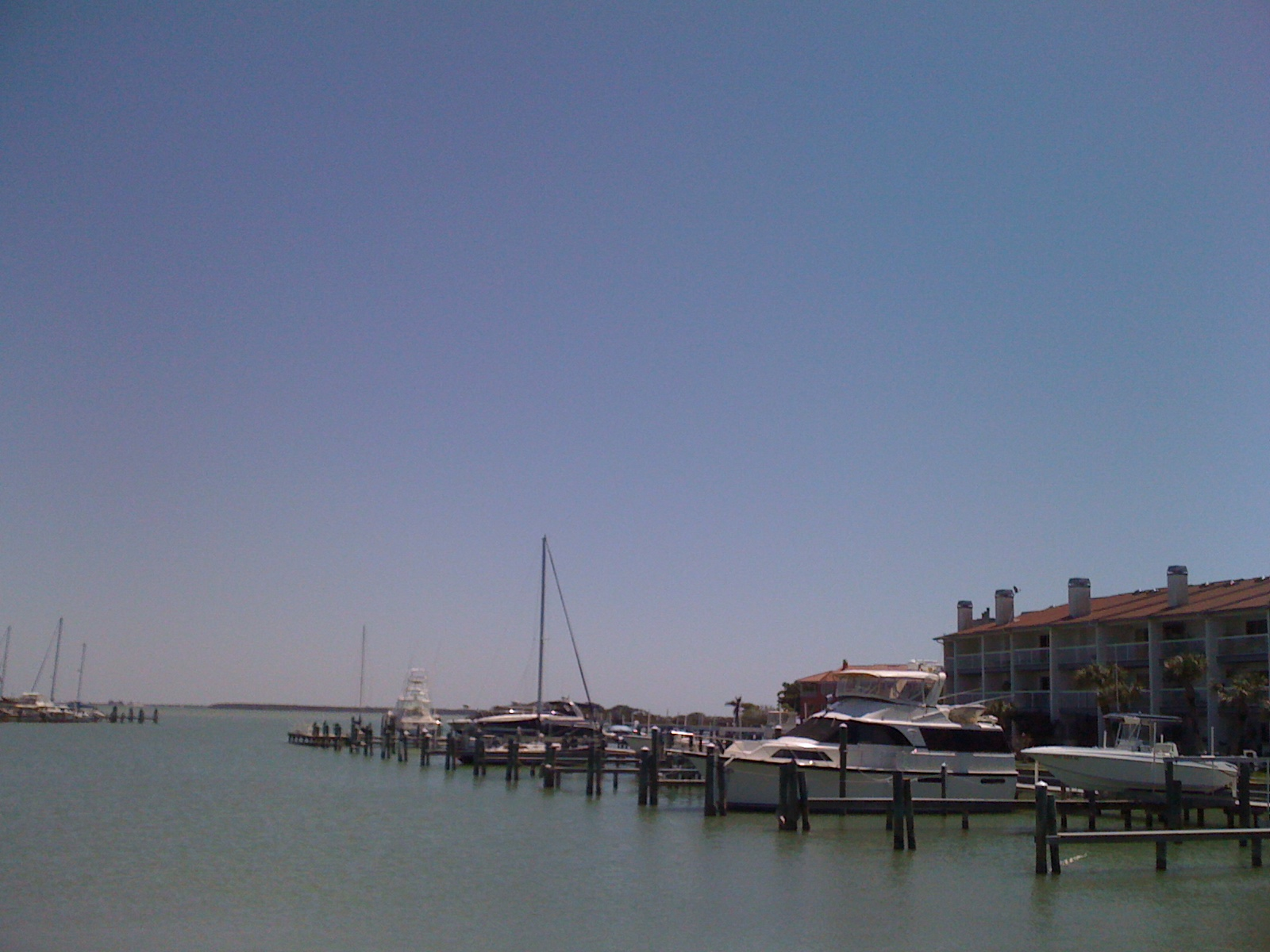
- Boats along the docks of Tierra Verde in 2010

- Location in Pinellas County and the state of Florida
- Coordinates: 27°40′08″N 82°43′46″W
- Country: United States
- State: Florida
- County: Pinellas

Area
  - Total: 4.61 sq mi (11.94 km^{2})
  - Land: 1.24 sq mi (3.21 km^{2})
  - Water: 3.37 sq mi (8.73 km^{2})
- Elevation: 3 ft (0.91 m)

Population (2020)
  - Total: 3,836
  - Density: 3,098.3/sq mi (1,196.26/km^{2})
- Time zone: UTC-5 (Eastern (EST))
  - Summer (DST): UTC-4 (EDT)
- ZIP code: 33715
- Area code: 727
- FIPS code: 12-71825
- GNIS feature ID: 2402931

Tierra Verde is a census-designated place (CDP) in Pinellas County, Florida, United States. As of the 2020 census, Tierra Verde had a population of 3,836. The community is located on an island near the entrance of Tampa Bay, and is connected by the bridges of the Pinellas Bayway to both St. Petersburg and St. Pete Beach. At the southern end of Tierra Verde is Fort De Soto, a county park.

== Geography ==
According to the United States Census Bureau, the CDP has a total area of 4.9 square miles (12.6 km^{2}), of which 1.2 square miles (3.1 km^{2}) is land and 3.7 square miles (9.5 km^{2}) (75.07%) is water.

== Demographics ==
Historical population
Census	Pop.	Note	%±
2020	3,836		—
U.S. Decennial Census

=== 2020 census ===
As of the 2020 census, Tierra Verde had a population of 3,836. The median age was 60.6 years. 8.7% of residents were under the age of 18 and 37.5% of residents were 65 years of age or older. For every 100 females there were 100.6 males, and for every 100 females age 18 and over there were 99.6 males age 18 and over.

100.0% of residents lived in urban areas, while 0.0% lived in rural areas.

There were 1,865 households in Tierra Verde, of which 10.7% had children under the age of 18 living in them. Of all households, 62.8% were married-couple households, 15.3% were households with a male householder and no spouse or partner present, and 16.0% were households with a female householder and no spouse or partner present. About 24.7% of all households were made up of individuals and 13.2% had someone living alone who was 65 years of age or older.

There were 2,360 housing units, of which 21.0% were vacant. The homeowner vacancy rate was 1.9% and the rental vacancy rate was 19.5%.

Racial composition as of the 2020 census
Race	Number	Percent
White	3,455	90.1%
Black or African American	49	1.3%
American Indian and Alaska Native	6	0.2%
Asian	58	1.5%
Native Hawaiian and Other Pacific Islander	1	0.0%
Some other race	27	0.7%
Two or more races	240	6.3%
Hispanic or Latino (of any race)	178	4.6%

=== 2000 census ===
As of the census of 2000, there were 3,574 people, 1,661 households, and 1,132 families residing in the CDP. The population density was 938.7/km^{2} (2,430.1/mi^{2}). There were 1,975 housing units at an average density of 518.7/km^{2} (1,342.9/mi^{2}). The racial makeup of the CDP was 95.89% White, 1.79% African American, 0.20% Native American, 0.98% Asian, 0.14% Pacific Islander, 0.48% from other races, and 0.53% from two or more races. Hispanic or Latino of any race were 3.41% of the population.

There were 1,661 households, out of which 17.0% had children under the age of 18 living with them, 62.7% were married couples living together, 3.3% had a female householder with no husband present, and 31.8% were non-families. 23.0% of all households were made up of individuals, and 4.8% had someone living alone who was 65 years of age or older. The average household size was 2.15 and the average family size was 2.53.

In the CDP, the population was spread out, with 13.8% under the age of 18, 3.7% from 18 to 24, 26.4% from 25 to 44, 41.8% from 45 to 64, and 14.4% who were 65 years of age or older. The median age was 48 years. For every 100 females, there were 101.8 males. For every 100 females age 18 and over, there were 103.2 males.

=== Income and poverty ===
The median income for a household in the CDP was $86,617, and the median income for a family was $96,155. Males had a median income of $63,750 versus $41,250 for females. The per capita income for the CDP was $48,259. About 1.9% of families and 3.9% of the population were below the poverty line, including 2.6% of those under age 18 and none of those age 65 or over.

In 2010 the median income for a household in the CDP was $100,500, and the median income for a family was $125,547. The per capita income for the CDP was $64,731.

== History ==
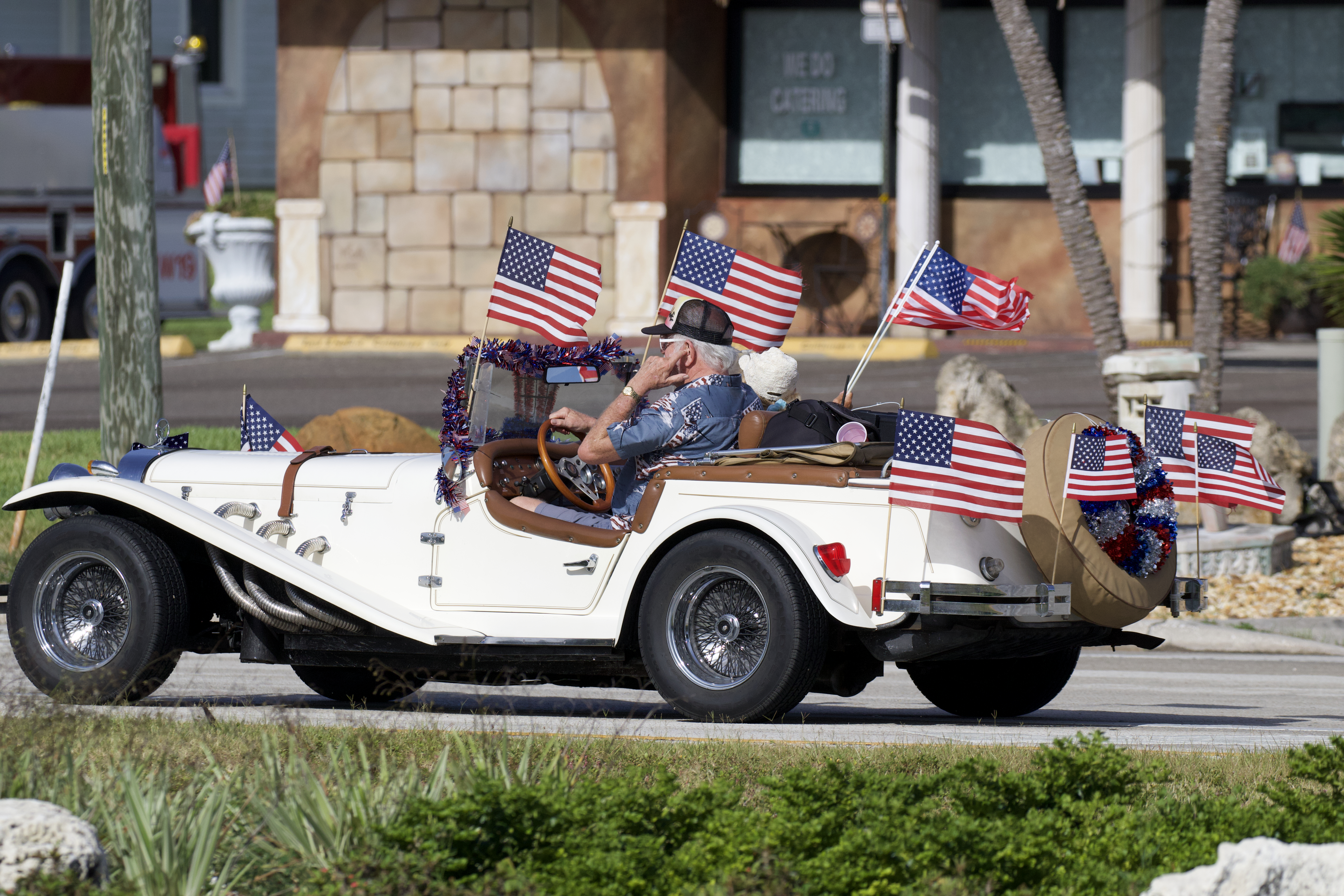
Tierra Verde 4th of July celebration in 2020

Tierra Verde was once 15 islands covered with mangroves, pines and bush. These islands ranged in size from only a few acres to the largest, Cabbage Key, having over 289 acres (1.17 km^{2}). For centuries, Native Americans used the islands for ceremonial and burial grounds. A marker remains on the east side of Pinellas Bayway, just north of East Shore Drive, where Native American relics were found in a typical shell mound, excavated when the road was built to Fort De Soto Park. The islands were sacred ground to Native nations as far back as 500 years ago, archaeologists suggest, and deadly conflicts occurred when outsiders trespassed.

Then, the Spanish explorers came. One explorer, Juan Ponce de León, came to the area in 1513, and again in 1521, when he received the wound that he later died from after returning to Cuba. Later, Narvaez and Hernando de Soto explored, and then pirates and buccaneers sailed the area, including José Gaspar, Juan Gomez and Jean Lafitte. A treasure was reputed to have once been buried here.

In 1848 Robert E. Lee, then a lieutenant colonel in the U.S. army, recommended that Mullet Key be used for coastal defense in Florida. During the Spanish–American War of 1898, Fort De Soto was built on Mullet Key. Remains of the fort still stand, along with fortifications on Egmont Key. In 1948 the federal government sold Mullet Key to Pinellas County for park and recreation facilities, now Fort De Soto Park.

Cabbage Key was documented in 1902 as the location where a particularly large alligator was caught, the specimen being reported as twelve feet long and weighing 431 pounds. Human skeletons were also found on the island at one time, although early searches found no pottery. A dredging project in 1913 filled in low-lying areas of the island, and in December of that year the island was sold by owner Will Dent to "[a] syndicate composed of H.E. Dickens, E. Durant and others" for around $50,000. Early settlers to the area included Baltimore sea captain William Bunce and Silas Dent, who with his brother had a dairy farm. Dent lived on Cabbage Key until he died there in 1952. The Roberts family was among the early settlers of Pass-a-Grille and Tierra Verde. George "Florida" Roberts was a fishing guide for figures such as land developer Walter Fuller, Cecil B. Detre, and John Wanamaker. The thousands of tarpon caught by Roberts and his clients can be found as far away as Alexandria, Egypt, in the home of Sir Harry Rofe. By 1920, Cabbage Key had "a first-class dairy with 36 cows", as well as the first wireless tower in Pinellas County.

Although two homes were built on Monte Cristo in 1923, and one in 1946, things were quiet until the mid-1950s when a Dr. Bradley "Doc" Waldron went to Tallahassee and persuaded the State of Florida to sell him Pine Key, Cabbage Key, Pardee Key and the surrounding bay bottom. This was about the same time construction of the old Skyway Bridge began. Waldron formed a partnership with two builders from Detroit, Hyman and Irving Green, who became majority owners of a group of 36 corporations. They named their island investment "Green Land".

Waldron-Green Associates applied for a dredge-and-fill permit in 1957. Their intent: to pump some 9,000,000 cubic yards (6,900,000 m^{3}) of sand and shells from the bottom of the bay and thus enlarge and raise the ground level of the three keys Doc Waldron had purchased from the State and join them to create one large island intersected with canals between the sections.

Meanwhile, others sought county and state permission to dredge and pump the bay bottom and build up Bird Key, today's Bayway Isles and Isla Del Sol. Miami developer Leonard Ratner purchased land which became the site of Eckerd College. Real estate ventures in the area began in 1884 when Hamilton Disston, once the largest landowner in the United States, began and lost his Disston City development, which later was renamed Gulfport in 1910.

At first, the only way to get to Tierra Verde was by boat. A ferry ran from Pass-a-Grille to a dock at the end of Madonna Boulevard. Then the state developed its plans for the Bayway and financed it through a $16.8 million bond issue. The Greens persuaded the Department of Transportation to add a Fort De Soto leg and contributed the land on which it was to be built, thus assuring themselves of land access to their proposed Tierra Verde.

The state's final road and bridge plans were approved in early 1960, and the developer's dredging permit was granted in December of that year. The dredging would create about 5,000 acres (20 km^{2}) of buildable land. Waldron-Green and their various partners and corporations then sold the islands, with the dredge-and-fill permits, to Louis Berlanti, a contractor from New York City, and his son, Fred.

In 1960 Louis and Fred Berlanti arrived in Tierra Verde. By June of that year Louis was named president of the Tierra Verde Community Association, Inc.; Doc Waldron and H. D. Sluyter, of Dallas, Texas, were each appointed vice president. There was considerable speculation at the time as to exactly whose money it was that Berlanti represented. He was generally considered to be a "nominee" for Clint Murchison, Sr., the Texas oil tycoon, since both Murchison and Sluyter had been elected directors of the Association. One or more union pension funds were thought, by some, to be the real source of the new money.

On June 30, 1961, the Tierra Verde Community Association Articles of Incorporation were filed with the State of Florida, and the original Declaration of Restrictions and Covenants were recorded in public records in August that same year.

By December 1962, there was a road and a bridge to Tierra Verde. In January 1963, Guy Lombardo's Port O' Call Resort had its grand opening, where Frank Sinatra, Marlene Dietrich, Liberace, Mel Tormé, and many other musical and theatrical stars would later perform. Two episodes of the popular TV show Route 66 were filmed there. The place was hopping with celebrities. Lombardo promoted the resort all across the country when the band did a 10-week national bus tour to more than 20 cities. Every show included several minutes to promote Tierra Verde and "his and the Murchisons' Port O' Call Resort." All across the country, their bus had a Tierra Verde banner hung on its sides.

Six months later, on August 16, 1963, Louis and Fred Berlanti died. The private airplane he was flying with his son was sabotaged and exploded over Lake Okeechobee, Florida, killing them both. Fragments of their bodies and their exploded airplane were found floating in Lake Okeechobee. Berlanti had suffered sizable real estate losses from Castro government property confiscations and had pledged half a million dollars to unseat the Castro regime. He and his son were members of the "United Organizations for the Liberation of Cuba". The St. Petersburg Times also alluded to "covert" local activities.

With the death of the Berlantis, Tierra Verde was in the hands of the Murchisons for more than 14 years. Guy Lombardo and his band returned for only one more season, and was quoted as saying he had tried to strike a "new deal" with the Murchisons but had not succeeded. He never returned.

Guy Lombardo died in 1977, the same year that real estate developer Frank E. Mackle III was elected president of a new venture called the Tierra Verde Company, a joint venture between Madonna Corporation (a Murchison interest), and Delverde (Deltona) Corporation. Because of lack of local interest, the Tierra Verde Company worked with a network of international brokers and sold many lots to overseas investors. But growth on Tierra Verde was still slow. However, in 1984 an exit ramp was built connecting the Pinellas Bayway to Interstate 275, and Tierra Verde property sales increased greatly because of the easier access. In January 1985 Deltona turned the community over to the homeowners.

Tierra Verde may have been named perhaps as much for the brothers Green as for its green land. Tierra Verde is a 667-acre (2.70 km^{2}) unincorporated portion of Pinellas County. Both St. Petersburg and St. Pete Beach have bid for annexation, but Tierra Verde has voted to stay independent. The 15 original islands are now the present six areas of Tierra Verde: Monte Cristo, Entrada, Pinellas Bayway, Sands Point, East Shore (Bayview) and West Shore (Oceanview).

In 1980 Tierra Verde real estate was valued at $15 million. By 1991 values had soared to $304 million. In November 1996 the Pinellas County Property Appraiser's Office evaluated Tierra Verde property at $349 million, 1999 values were listed at $478 million and in 2003 values are listed at $632 million. There are now approximately 2,000 single-family and multi-family structures on Tierra Verde, as well as a number of commercial enterprises. An estimated 2,500 families are expected when Tierra Verde is built to completion.
