= Tropical Storm Debby (2012) =

Atlantic tropical storm in 2012

- Tropical Storm Debby at peak intensity on June 24, 2012

Meteorological history
- Formed: June 23, 2012
- Extratropical: June 27, 2012
- Dissipated: June 30, 2012

Tropical storm
- 1-minute sustained (SSHWS/NWS)
- Highest winds: 65 mph (100 km/h)
- Lowest pressure: 990 mbar (hPa); 29.23 inHg

Overall effects
- Fatalities: 5 direct, 3 indirect
- Damage: $250 million (2012 USD)
- Areas affected: Cuba, Central America, Southeastern United States, Bermuda
- IBTrACS
- Part of the 2012 Atlantic hurricane season

Tropical Storm Debby was a tropical cyclone that caused extensive flooding in North Florida and Central Florida during late June 2012. The fourth tropical cyclone and named storm of the 2012 Atlantic hurricane season, Debby developed from a trough of low pressure in the central Gulf of Mexico on June 23. At the time, Debby was the earliest fourth named storm to form within the Atlantic basin on record. Despite a projected track toward landfall in Louisiana or Texas, the storm headed the opposite direction, moving slowly north-northeast and northeastward. The storm slowly strengthened, and at 1800 UTC on June 25, attained its peak intensity with maximum sustained winds of 65 mph (100 km/h). Dry air, westerly wind shear, and upwelling of cold waters prevented further intensification over the next 24 hours. Instead, Debby weakened, and by late on June 26, it was a minimal tropical storm. At 2100 UTC, the storm made landfall near Steinhatchee, Florida with winds of 40 mph (65 km/h). Once inland, the system continued to weaken while crossing Florida, and dissipated shortly after emerging into the Atlantic on June 27.

The storm dropped immense amounts of precipitation near its path. Rainfall peaked at 28.78 inches (731 mm) in Curtis Mill, Florida, located in southwestern Wakulla County. The Sopchoppy River, which reached its record height, flooded at least 400 structures in Wakulla County. Additionally, the Suwannee River reached its highest level since Hurricane Dora in 1964. Further south in Pasco County, the Anclote River and Pithlachascotee River overflowed, flooding communities with "head deep" water and causing damage to 106 homes. An additional 587 homes were inundated after the Black Creek overflowed in Clay County. Several roads and highways in North Florida were left impassable, including Interstate 10 and U.S. Route 90. U.S. Routes 19 and 98 were also inundated by coastal flooding. In Central and South Florida, damage was primarily caused by tornadoes, one of which caused a fatality. Overall, Debby caused at least $250 million in losses and 8 deaths, 7 in Florida and 1 in Alabama.

== Meteorological history ==
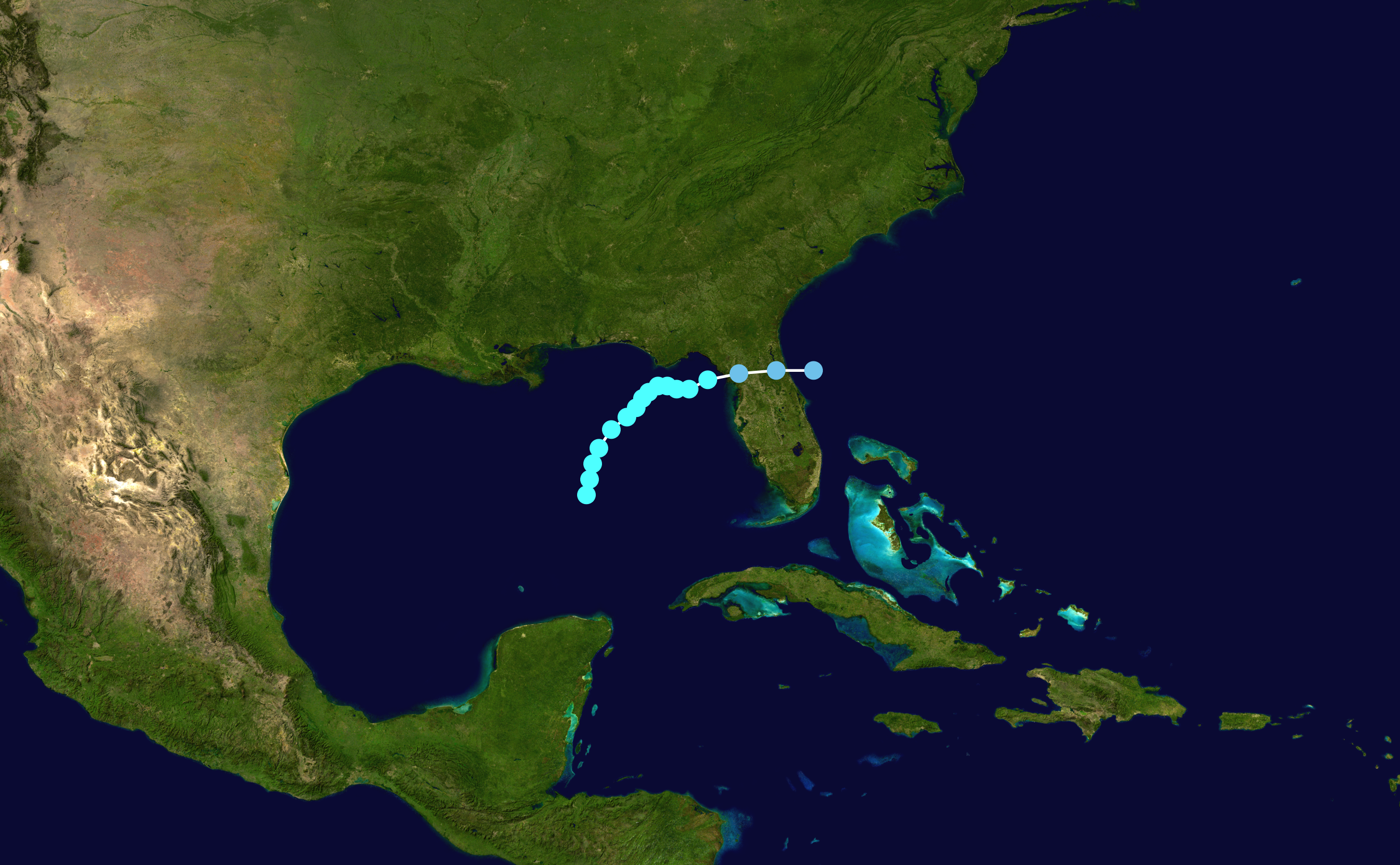
Map plotting the storm's track and intensity, according to the Saffir–Simpson scale Map key Saffir–Simpson scale Tropical depression (≤38 mph, ≤62 km/h) Tropical storm (39–73 mph, 63–118 km/h) Category 1 (74–95 mph, 119–153 km/h) Category 2 (96–110 mph, 154–177 km/h) Category 3 (111–129 mph, 178–208 km/h) Category 4 (130–156 mph, 209–251 km/h) Category 5 (≥157 mph, ≥252 km/h) Unknown Storm type Tropical cyclone Subtropical cyclone Extratropical cyclone, remnant low, tropical disturbance, or monsoon depression

During mid-June, the Intertropical Convergence Zone (ITCZ) made its annual migration northward into the southern Gulf of Mexico. Coinciding with a Madden–Julian oscillation, a weak surface low pressure area developed on June 19, and subsequently moved inland over the Yucatán Peninsula. While the system crossed the peninsula, a tropical wave moved through the northwestern Caribbean Sea on June 18. The wave reached the Gulf of Mexico on June 20 and merged with the low a few days later, spawning a trough of low pressure on June 22. Located in the southeastern Gulf of Mexico, moderate vertical wind shear caused the system to remain disorganized. Nonetheless, Air Force Reserve Hurricane Hunter aircraft indicated that the trough acquired a low-level circulation on June 23, while ships in the area reported tropical storm force winds. Thus, it is estimated that Tropical Storm Debby developed at 1200 UTC on June 23, centered about 290 miles (470 km) south of mouth of the Mississippi River.

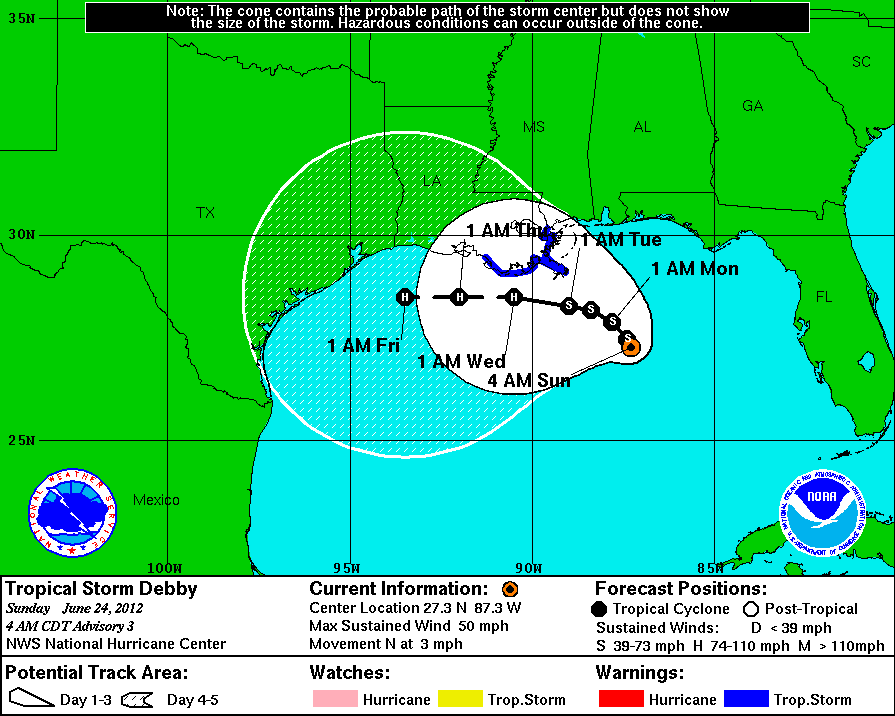
A forecast track prediction for Tropical Storm Debby on June 24, showing a path toward Texas

Becoming a tropical storm on June 23, Debby became the earliest fourth named storm in the Atlantic basin, surpassing the old record set by Hurricane Dennis on July 5, 2005, however with 2016's Danielle the record was beaten by three days. Initially, Debby was predicted to curve westward and potentially threaten Texas. A deepening trough would curve the storm westward, while wind shear was predicted to decrease. Although the storm generated very cold cloud tops, much of the convection was located more than 100 miles (160 km) from the center and still displaced to the east. By 1200 UTC on June 24, the forecast path was shifted from east-central Texas to southeastern Louisiana. Despite persistent wind shear, Debby was strengthening and around that time, the storm attained its maximum sustained wind speed of 65 mph (100 km/h). Later on June 24, the National Hurricane Center noted in its next advisory that this "is a very difficult and highly uncertain forecast", citing Debby's slow movement and widespread computer forecast models.

The forecast track for Debby was shifted significantly to the east late on June 24, and it was predicted that the storm would move northward and make landfall near Panama City, Florida. Based on a dropsonde estimate, Debby attained its minimum barometric pressure of 990 mbar (29 inHg) at 0000 UTC on June 25. However, the storm began to weaken due to increasing wind shear, drier air, and upwelling of cold water, caused by Debby's slow movement. It was initially composed of multiple small swirls, but consolidated into one well-defined low-level circulation by early on June 25. Due to its excessively slow movement and no prediction for acceleration, the National Hurricane Center remarked that, "the cyclone does not seem to be going anywhere anytime soon." A burst in deep convection occurred later on June 25, though adverse environmental conditions prevented re-intensification. Debby began curving east-northeastward and began to speed up on June 26, in response to a mid-latitude trough digging into the western Atlantic Ocean. While approaching the Florida Big Bend, Debby produced only a small area of deep convection on satellite imagery.

At 2100 UTC June 26, Debby made landfall near Steinhatchee, Florida with winds of 40 mph (65 km/h). The storm weakened quickly after moving inland, and by early on June 27, it was downgraded to a tropical depression, while located about 35 miles (56 km) north of Gainesville, Florida. Debby maintained tropical cyclone status while crossing Florida, but degenerated into a trough of low pressure by 1800 UTC on June 27. In the final advisory issued by the National Hurricane Center three hours later, the agency noted that Debby could eventually reacquire tropical characteristics. After its dissipation, however, the remnants did not regenerate into a tropical cyclone, but re-developed a new center of circulation and strengthened slightly due to baroclinic conditions. As it accelerated northward, Debby's remnants became increasingly frontal in nature, and once again degenerated into an open trough at 1800 UTC on June 30; at this time, the disturbance was located south of Newfoundland.

== Preparations ==
Tropical Storm Debby near landfall in Florida on June 26

Upon development of Debby on June 23, a tropical storm warning was issued from the mouth of the Pearl River to Morgan City, Louisiana, excluding New Orleans or Lake Pontchartrain. On the following day, a separate tropical storm warning was put into effect from the Mississippi and Alabama border to the mouth of the Ochlockonee River in Florida. At 1500 UTC on June 24, the tropical storm warning was extended to the mouth of the Suwannee River. Simultaneously, a tropical storm watch was issued from the Suwannee River to Anclote Key. These were all canceled at 1500 UTC on June 25, though a tropical storm warning was then implemented from Destin to Englewood, Florida. Early on June 26, a tropical storm warning was issued from Mexico Beach to Englewood, Florida. By 2100 UTC that day, the tropical storm warning was extended to the mouth of Steinhatchee River in Florida. This was discontinued after Debby became a tropical depression.

Several additional preparations took place in addition to tropical cyclone warnings and watches. According to the Federal government of the United States, nearly 25% of crude oil and natural gas production in the Gulf of Mexico was shut down. In Louisiana, Governor Bobby Jindal declared a state of emergency. On June 24, voluntary evacuations were issued for several areas in northwest Florida during the approach of the storm, especially Taylor and Wakulla Counties. Governor of Florida Rick Scott also declared a state of emergency on June 25. Additionally, mandatory evacuations were issued for St. George Island, Alligator Point, and other low-lying areas of Franklin County.

== Impact ==
Throughout the Southeastern United States, eight people were killed in relation to Tropical Storm Debby. Of these, seven took place in Florida and one in Alabama. Throughout Central and South Florida, the outer bands of the storm spawned 13 tornadoes: five in Collier County, two in Glades County, one in Hardee County, two in Highlands County, one in Miami-Dade County, and two in Palm Beach County. Overall, losses from the storm were estimated to have reached at least $250 million.

=== Florida ===
==== North Florida and Panhandle ====
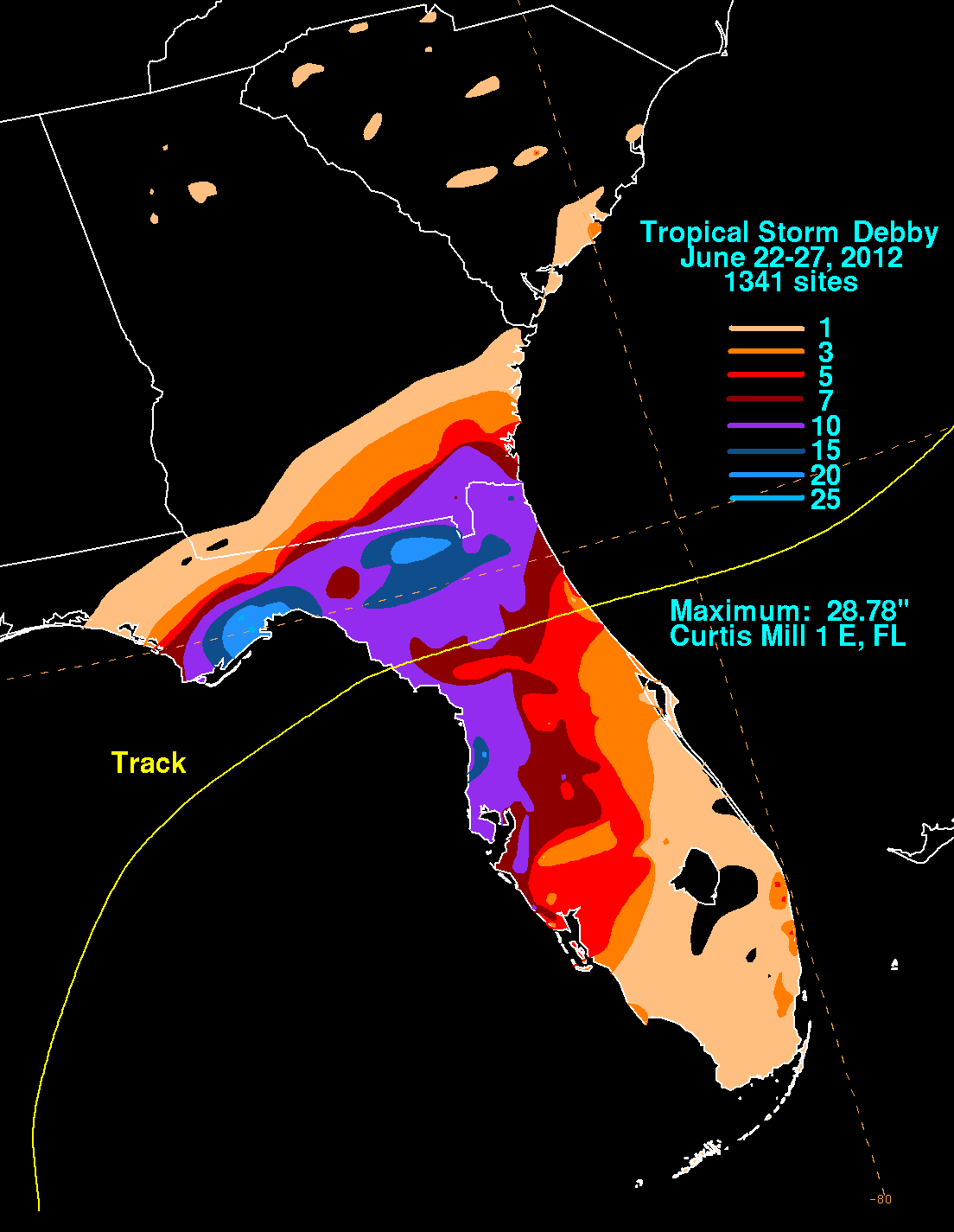
Storm total rainfall from Debby in the United States

Throughout June 25, an intense complex of thunderstorms developed to the north of Debby's center and produced torrential rains over the Florida Panhandle for much of the day. Many areas received rainfall in excess of 15 inches (380 mm). Precipitation peaked at 28.78 inches (731 mm) in Curtis Mill, which is located in Wakulla County. In Panacea, a Mesonet station recorded a 24‑hour rainfall of 20.63 inches (524 mm). Rainfall caused numerous small creeks, streams, and rivers to rapidly exceed their banks and flood adjacent communities. The Sopchoppy River crested at 36.8 feet (11.2 m), which was a record height. Numerous homes were flooded, some up to the second story. Two bridges were damaged, and numerous roads around the county were washed out or closed. Over 400 structures were affected by flooding, including more than 170 mobile homes and nearly 200 single-family residences. Of these structures, 40 were destroyed, 61 had major flood damage, 41 suffered minor flood damage, and 271 were affected by flooding. Additionally, coastal flooding impacted the county, with a storm surge of 4 feet (1.2 m) and tides up 6.5 feet (2.0 m) in St. Marks. Numerous roads were underwater and several area businesses received water intrusion in that city. U.S. Route 98 was over-washed just north of St. Marks. As a result, mandatory evacuations were ordered south of U.S. Route 98 and around the Sopchoppy River. In total, 67 people required rescuing. Losses throughout the county were assessed at $9.09 million.

The storm also produced adverse effects in Franklin County. In Apalachicola, a gust of 65 mph (105 km/h) was observed as well as 6.03 inches (153 mm) of rainfall on June 24, resulting in widespread flash flooding. The John Gorrie Memorial Bridge connecting Apalachicola to Eastpoint was closed on June 24 due to high winds. A wind gust of 66 mph (106 km/h) was reported at the Apalachicola Regional Airport. The St. George Island Bridge, a 4 miles (6.4 km) bridge connecting Eastpoint to St. George Island over the Apalachicola Bay, was also closed on June 24 due to high winds. The bridge was opened later that day as both St. George Island and Alligator Point were put under a mandatory evacuation, requiring all people to leave immediately, and those remaining on the islands subject to arrest. St. George Island, a popular resort community and tourist destination, lost all power on June 24 due to high winds destroying three power poles in the Apalachicola Bay; a Progress Energy spokesperson stated that it could be days before power was restored because the conditions are too unsafe for workers. In Bay County, moderate beach erosion occurred, with a storm surge reaching 1.5 feet (0.46 m) and storm tide of 2.42 feet (0.74 m) in Panama City. Flooding forced the closure of a few roads in Jefferson County, including U.S. Route 27 west of U.S. Route 19.

In Madison County, one house was surrounded by in overflowing retention pond near the city of Madison. State Road 51 in Lafayette County flooded, caused by the Steinhatchee River exceeding its banks. In Dixie County, several roads north of Cross City experienced flooding, while water entered at least 40 homes along the Steinhatchee River. Moderate coastal flooding occurred in Horseshoe Beach, due to an estimated storm surge of 4 feet (1.2 m), with tides reaching 7 feet (2.1 m) above normal. Water entered several homes near the coast and surrounded outbuildings by up to 1.5 feet (0.46 m). In Columbia County, preliminary losses were placed in excess of $20 million as of July 3 and did not take into account hundreds of homes that remained flooded at the time. Several bridges were washed out due to the heavy rain; both U.S. Route 319 and U.S. Route 98 were closed due to flooding. In Suwannee County, the Suwannee River at Live Oak reached its highest crest since Hurricane Dora in 1964. Gainesville received its second-highest daily rain total of 6.95 inches (177 mm) on June 24. In Marion County, up to 10.25 inches (260 mm) of rain was reported near Fellowship. As a result, State Road 40 was closed due to high water. Additionally, as many as 52 sinkholes were reported to have formed along roadways in the county. Flooding also occurred in Duval County. The public reported that water entered a home on Rose Street in Jacksonville. Streets were flooded in Orange Park, and water approached the doors of houses, forcing some residents to evacuate. The St. Marys River reached historic heights and flooded a lot of homes in Baker and Nassau Counties.

==== Central Florida ====
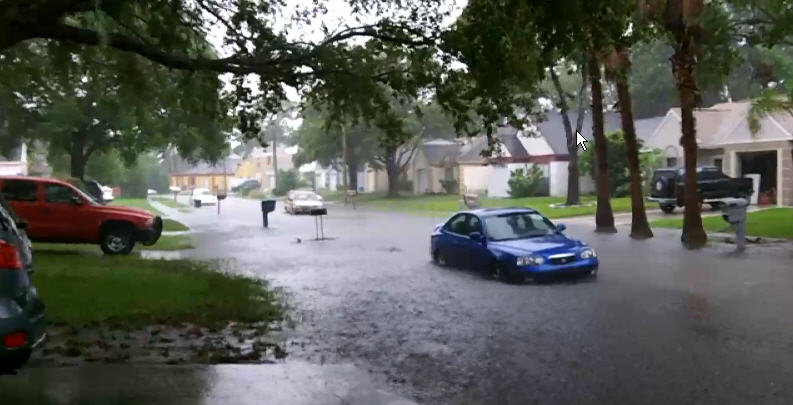
A street flooding in Largo, Florida, during Debby.

In Levy County, tropical storm force winds were felt along the coast. Heavy rainfall was reported across the county, with the CoCoRaHS site near Chiefland of receiving 13.42 inches (341 mm). At Cedar Key, tides reached 6.78 feet (2.07 m) mean lower low water on June 25. The highest storm surge was estimated to have peaked at 4.49 feet (1.37 m) mean lower low water. A few buildings were flooded by the storm surge at Cedar Key and Yankeetown. In total, damage to public property was approximately $175,000. Rainfall was generally above 9 inches (230 mm) across Citrus County, and peaked at 12.07 inches (307 mm) near Hernando. Several homes were flooded with 1 to 3 feet (0.30 to 0.91 m) of water. Significant street flooding was reported at Kings Bay, while several streets were inundated by up to 2 feet (0.61 m) of water in Homosassa. Overall, damage was minor, reaching about $127,000. The storm dropped heavy rainfall in Hernando County, with 15.53 inches (394 mm) in Spring Hill. A portion of State Road 589 was shut down between State Road 50 and U.S. Route 98, with as much as 5 feet (1.5 m) of standing water on that stretch of the highway. Along the Anclote and Pithlachascotee Rivers in Pasco County, emergency managers ordered mandatory evacuations for 14,000–20,000 people as the rivers rose dramatically. The Anclote River rose from 9 ft (2.7 m) to 27 ft (8.2 m), well above major flood stage, leaving surrounding areas in "head-deep" water. At least 106 homes in the county were damaged by flood waters. Throughout the county, damage to private property was $1.5 million, while public property losses were estimated at $26 million.

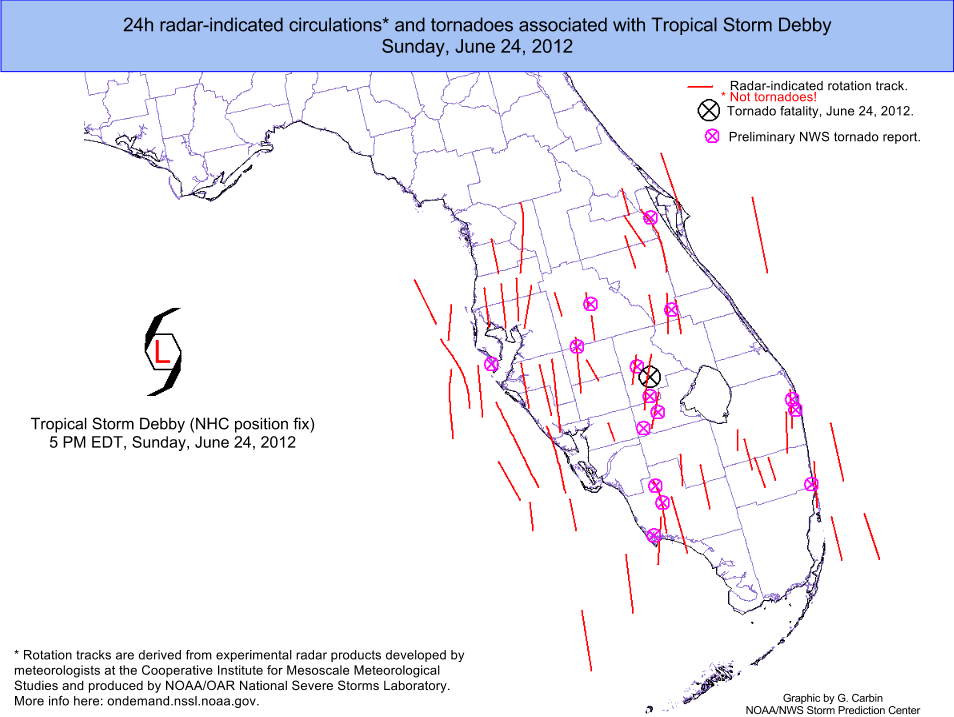
Mesocyclone tracks associated with the outer rainbands of Tropical Storm Debby across Florida on June 24.

A man drowned near Lake Dorr in Lake County after his canoe capsized along a river in Ocala National Forest. In Polk County, a woman died after her car hydroplaned on a flooded road. Another person drowned on a river in the after his canoe capsized; however, it is unknown whether or not his death was attributable to Debby. Throughout Polk County, 115 homes were damaged, mainly as a result of tornadoes, and losses were estimated at $5 million. In St. Petersburg, a gust of 45 mph (72 km/h) was observed, while 1.88 inches (48 mm) of rain fell in a one-hour period. With the substantial loss of beaches, tourism in the region is expected to suffer significantly. Portions of Upham Beach in Pinellas County were completely eroded up to the seawall and other areas in that county had lost 20 to 30 ft (6.1 to 9.1 m) of sand. On Treasure Island, coastal dunes were eroded by 10 to 15 ft (3.0 to 4.6 m). In Pass-a-Grille, Debby's storm surge flooded coastal hotels with ankle-deep water as the dunes were washed away. Throughout St. Pete Beach, 30–40 homes were damaged by a tornado spawned by Debby. Losses throughout the city were estimated at $1.5 million. In Hillsborough County, wind gusts of 39 to 51 mph (63 to 82 km/h) were measured at MacDill Air Force Base. Rainfall was at least 5 inches (130 mm) across much of the county and peaked at 11.91 inches (303 mm) near Citrus Park. The storm damage 74 buildings, 6 of which were destroyed. The highest storm surge was estimated to have reached 4.07 feet (1.24 m) in height. As a result, portions of Bay Shore Boulevard were inundated for three days.

On Anna Maria Island in Manatee County, water reached the retention walls of several condos, some of which were undermined, allowing water to enter beach-side pools. The most significant losses were on the south side of the island where up to half of the dunes were lost. In Sarasota County, as much as 10.9 inches (280 mm) of rain fell near the city of Sarasota. Wind and floods damaged 52 structures, with losses reaching $540,000. At Lido Beach, high water flooded a parking lot. Damage to area beaches from erosion was estimated at $1.9 million. A state of emergency was declared due to storm surge damage in the county. The Charlotte County Airport recorded a 55 mph (89 km/h) wind gust, while the highest rainfall total was 5.25 inches (133 mm) near Englewood. Damage reached $2.5 million and was mostly from beach erosion and coastal flooding. In Lee County, rainfall peaked at 4.95 inches (126 mm) in Cape Coral. Rough tides and storm surge caused beach erosion and coastal flooding, especially at Captiva and Sanibel Islands. The county suffered approximately $2.3 million in losses.

==== South Florida ====
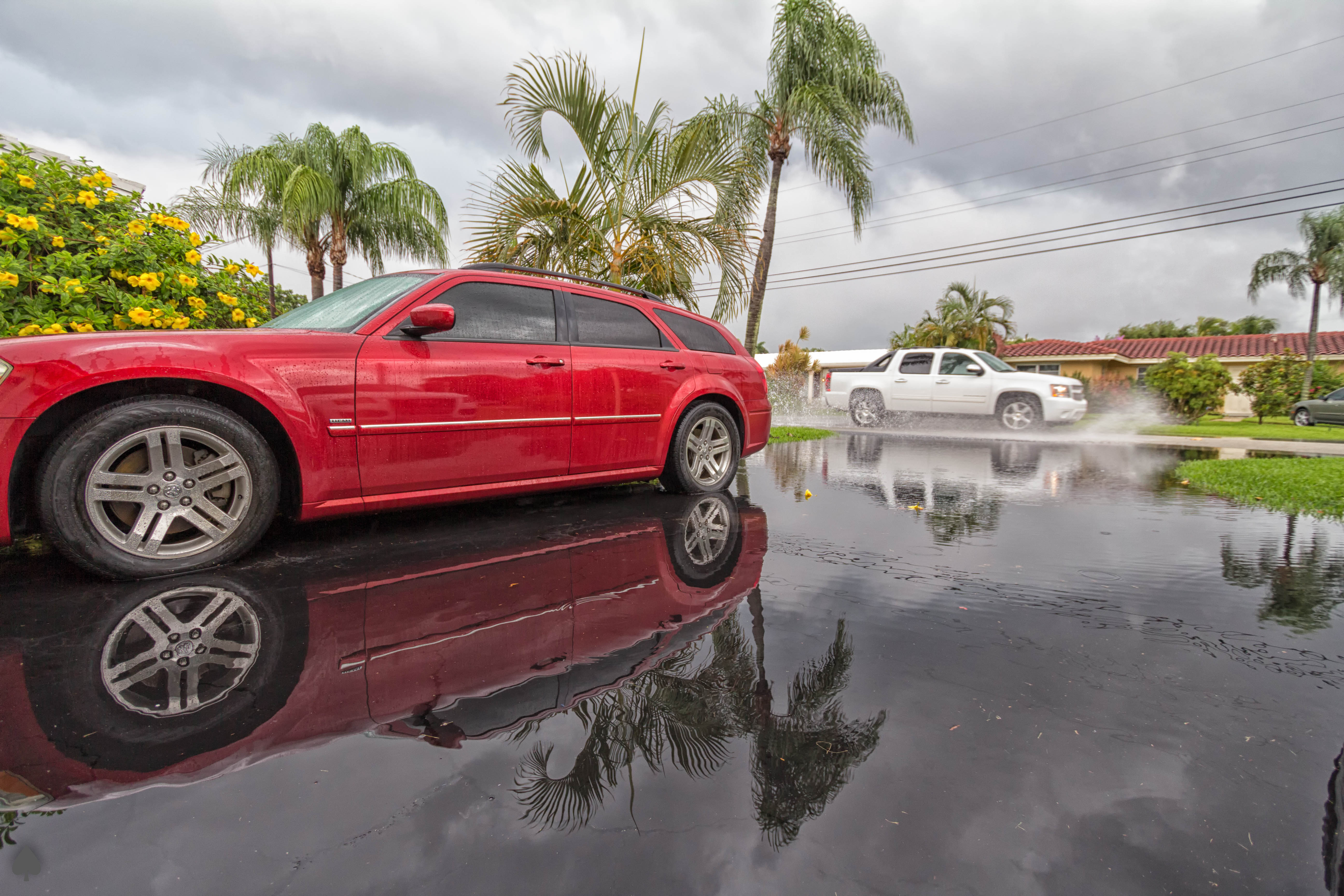
Minor flooding caused by Debby in South Florida.

At the Palm Beach International Airport in West Palm Beach,1.51 inches (38 mm) of precipitation fell in only one hour. Further south in Pompano Beach, 4.32 inches (110 mm) of rain was reported in a 24-hour period.

==== Tornadoes ====
A prominent convergence band developed east of the circulation center and posed a minimal risk of tornadic activity over the Florida Keys and southwestern Florida Peninsula. Ample low-level moisture and air temperatures above 80 °F (27 °C) created Convective Available Potential Energy (CAPE) of 2,000 J/kg. The first tornadoes occurred more than 40 hours before landfall and were in the city limits of Naples within Collier County at 3:35 p.m. and 4:00 p.m. EDT; both were rated EF0. This was atypical to the majority of tropical cyclone tornado events in which the bulk of activity occurs within hours of landfall and after. By 4:44 EDT, weak thunderstorm cells were noted over Collier and Monroe Counties; however, they were not considered as significant as normal tropical cyclone-produced supercells. Activity in the nighttime hours shifted to potential waterspouts moving onshore in southwestern counties. Conditions became more conducive for tornadic activity by the late-morning hours of June 24 as Debby's broad circulation meandered generally northeast. Storm-relative helicity (Note: Storm-relative helicity is a measure of cyclonic updraft from ground level to 0.62 mi (1 km) in height. Values exceeding 100 m^{2}/s^{2} indicate a greater possibility of tornadoes.) reached 250–300 m^{2}/s^{2}, indicating potential for tornadoes. Accordingly, the Storm Prediction Center (SPC) issued a tornado watch for western Florida at 11:45 a.m. EDT.

By the afternoon of June 24, the focal point of discrete and/or rotating cells extended from the Tampa Bay area southeast to the Miami metropolitan area along a baroclinic zone. However, the eastern cells were inhibited by a more stable airmass. Along the western side, instability was enhanced by the entrainment of dry mid-level air into areas with MLCAPE of 1,000 J/kg. Bulk shear also exceeded 35 mph (56 km/h), values supportive of tornadic storms. Analysis of surface winds by the SPC at 7:01 p.m. EDT showed a 60 mph (97 km/h) low-level jet and increasing helicity values of 300–500 m^{2}/s^{2}. Successive mini supercells moving from the Gulf into western Florida were possible. By 9:16 p.m. EDT, the convergence band organized into a linear squall line and propagated east, emerging over the far western Atlantic Ocean near 12:00 a.m. EDT on June 25. Behind the squall, the overall environment became more stable and less conducive to tornadic activity. Around this time, Debby's center stalled out south of the Florida Panhandle. In the pre-dawn hours of June 25, a new band of thunderstorms developed over central Florida and a new tornado watch was issued at 4:40 a.m. EDT. Poorly modeled dry air entrainment and subsidence ultimately suppressed formation of tornadic storms throughout the day. Only one tornado touched down in Highlands County at 10:25 a.m. EDT on June 26, marking the end of the outbreak.

Throughout the nearly three-day outbreak, 25 tornadoes were confirmed across Florida of which only one exceeded EF1 intensity. As is the case for all tropical cyclone tornado events, an unknown number of tornadoes likely went undocumented over open waters. The most active phase of the outbreak occurred from 10:00 a.m. on June 24 to 12:00 a.m. EDT on June 25 with 22 tornadoes. Nineteen tornadoes formed within the right-front quadrant of Tropical Storm Debby—relative to the storm's motion—while the remainder formed in the right-back quadrant. (Note: Tornadic activity associated with tropical cyclones is most prominent in the northeast quadrant, with 68 percent of tornadoes in the Tropical Cyclone Tornado Dataset (TCTOR, 1995–2009) documented in this region. As storms weaken, the focal point of tornadoes shifts to the east and south.)

===== Confirmed tornadoes =====
Confirmed tornadoes by Enhanced Fujita rating
EFU	EF0	EF1	EF2	EF3	EF4	EF5	Total
0	18	5	2	0	0	0	25

List of confirmed tornadoes produced by Tropical Storm Debby in 2012 (Note: All dates are based on the local time zone where the tornado touched down; however, all times are in Coordinated Universal Time for consistency.)
EF#	Location	County / Parish	State	Start Coord.	Date	Time (UTC)	Path length	Maximum width
EF0	ESE of East Naples	Collier	Florida	26.11°N 81.747°W	June 23	19:35–19:37	1.7 mi (2.7 km)	20 yd (18 m)
EF0	A waterspout was observed moving inland from the Isles of Capri. Damage occurred along an intermittent path with small trees uprooted, a palm tree snapped, heavy damage to a lanai, and snapped tree branches, one of which struck a car.							
EF0	ENE of Naples Park	Collier	Florida	26.274°N 81.789°W	June 23	20:00	0.05 mi (0.080 km)	10 yd (9.1 m)
EF0	An extremely brief tornado snapped tree branches at the North Collier Hospital, one of which struck and injured a person.							
EF0	S of Zolfo Springs to WSW of Bowling Green	Hardee	Florida	27.4°N 81.78°W	June 24	14:15–14:30	17.03 mi (27.41 km)	100 yd (91 m)
EF0	A long-tracked tornado moved through predominantly rural areas, causing damage to orange groves, a barn, and a tractor.							
EF0	Muse	Glades	Florida	26.84°N 81.52°W	June 24	15:00	0.01 mi (0.016 km)	10 yd (9.1 m)
EF0	A brief tornado damaged the roof of a barn.							
EF0	S of Goodland to N of Royal Palm	Collier	Florida	25.762°N 81.641°W	June 24	15:10–15:40	16.2 mi (26.1 km)	30 yd (27 m)
EF0	A waterspout originated over Gullivan Bay and moved across the Ten Thousand Islands National Wildlife Refuge. Damage was confined to trees in unpopulated areas.							
EF0	E of Golden Gate	Collier	Florida	26.162°N 81.542°W	June 24	16:00	0.01 mi (0.016 km)	20 yd (18 m)
EF0	A trained spotter observed a tornado near Alligator Alley.							
EF2	Venus	Highlands	Florida	27.04°N 81.36°W	June 24	16:23–16:29	3.45 mi (5.55 km)	150 yd (140 m)
EF2	1 death – A woman was killed after being thrown 200 ft (61 m) by the tornado; her daughter was found in her arms with injuries. The tornado damaged or destroyed six homes, tossed boats in a lake, and downed numerous trees. The original public information statement from the NWS Forecast Office in Tampa Bay lists this as an EF2 tornado; however, the NCEI database lists this as an EF0 tornado.							
EF0	SW of Immokalee	Collier	Florida	26.37°N 81.55°W	June 24	16:25–16:30	0.1 mi (0.16 km)	20 yd (18 m)
EF0	A trained spotter observed a tornado over open fields.							
EF0	NW of Lake Worth	Palm Beach	Florida	26.634°N 80.0645°W	June 24	16:25	0.1 mi (0.16 km)	20 yd (18 m)
EF0	A brief tornado damaged trees and pulled debris from a park.							
EF0	West Palm Beach	Palm Beach	Florida	26.697°N 80.068°W	June 24	17:25–17:27	1.2 mi (1.9 km)	30 yd (27 m)
EF0	An intermittent tornado touched down in a warehouse district in West Palm Beach, damaging the roof and doors of one warehouse. It struck the West Palm Beach station, damaging trees, knocking down a gate, and snapping a rail crossing arm.							
EF0	Golden Beach	Miami-Dade	Florida	25.966°N 80.118°W	June 24	18:05–18:06	0.5 mi (0.80 km)	30 yd (27 m)
EF0	A waterspout briefly moved onshore, tossing beach chairs and damaging trees and a beach hut. One structure had its doors and a gate blown in.							
EF0	WSW of Palmdale	Glades	Florida	26.92°N 81.34°W	June 24	19:04	0.01 mi (0.016 km)	20 yd (18 m)
EF0	A police officer reported a tornado crossing SR 74.							
EF1	WNW of Placid Lakes	Highlands	Florida	27.27°N 81.44°W	June 24	19:23–19:30	5.31 mi (8.55 km)	100 yd (91 m)
EF1	This tornado remained over uninhabited areas for much of its track before crossing Lake June in Winter. Along the lake's north shore, nine homes were damaged. A two-story home had the majority of its top floor destroyed, with only an interior bathroom remaining. Portions of the roof were thrown 50 ft (15 m). A poorly built home was completely destroyed with debris thrown hundreds of feet upstream. A nearby workshop largely collapsed, with only one wall remaining. A graduate study through the University of Florida rated the damage to these structures as mid-range EF2; however, the NWS Forecast Office in Tampa Bay rated the tornado as EF1. Along the southeastern shore of Lake Francis, several more structures sustained minor damage.							
EF1	SSE of Indian Rocks Beach	Pinellas	Florida	27.8783°N 82.8437°W	June 24	19:40–19:43	0.74 mi (1.19 km)	75 yd (69 m)
EF1	A brief tornado damaged 21 structures; one home had a portion of its roof torn off.							
EF0	W of Pebble Creek	Hillsborough	Florida	28.1506°N 82.3747°W	June 24	20:39–20:41	1.06 mi (1.71 km)	50 yd (46 m)
EF0	A brief tornado caused minor damage to five homes; pool cages, fences, and trees were also damaged.							
EF1	New Port Richey	Pasco	Florida	28.2372°N 82.715°W	June 24	21:17–21:19	0.37 mi (0.60 km)	75 yd (69 m)
EF1	Five homes sustained major damage with losses reaching $650,000.							
EF0	SE of Winter Haven	Polk	Florida	27.96°N 81.68°W	June 24	22:55–22:56	0.92 mi (1.48 km)	25 yd (23 m)
EF0	A brief overturned a semi-trailer and downed trees and power lines.							
EF2	E of Winter Haven	Polk	Florida	27.95°N 81.68°W	June 24	00:04–00:12	6.22 mi (10.01 km)	150 yd (140 m)
EF2	A strong tornado damaged 17 homes, tore part of the roof off a big box store, and downed power lines.							
EF1	S of St. Pete Beach	Pinellas	Florida	27.7°N 82.74°W	June 24	00:21–00:25	3.02 mi (4.86 km)	50 yd (46 m)
EF1	A waterspout moved onshore near St. Pete Beach, destroying the top floor of a rental building and damaging a marina.							
EF0	SW of Oakland	Lake	Florida	28.4849°N 81.6609°W	June 24	00:59–01:05	3.71 mi (5.97 km)	100 yd (91 m)
EF0	A tornado damaged homes and trees on the south and north shores of Johns Lake.							
EF0	SE of Yeehaw Junction	Osceola	Florida	27.6694°N 80.8961°W	June 24	01:55–02:02	3.08 mi (4.96 km)	100 yd (91 m)
EF0	A tornado touched down in a wooded area near US 441 It traveled north, crossing SR 60 and the Florida Turnpike. A vacant motel and toll booth were damaged. Trees were downed, one of which fell on a car.							
EF1	SE of Sugarmill Woods	Citrus	Florida	28.7°N 82.47°W	June 24	01:57–02:03	4.99 mi (8.03 km)	100 yd (91 m)
EF1	Two mobile homes were destroyed, a block home suffered severe damage, and 20 homes had minor damage.							
EF0	NE of Deer Park	Osceola	Florida	28.1035°N 80.876°W	June 24	02:46–02:47	1.15 mi (1.85 km)	50 yd (46 m)
EF0	Damage was primarily confined to pine trees, though one fence was damaged and a pile of aluminum pipes was blown around.							
EF0	WNW of Space Coast Regional Airport	Brevard	Florida	28.5314°N 80.8614°W	June 24	03:37–03:38	1.17 mi (1.88 km)	25 yd (23 m)
EF0	A brief tornado was observed near SR 50, illuminated by lightning. A few tree limbs were downed.							
EF0	WNW of Okeechobee	Highlands	Florida	27.2714°N 81.023°W	June 26	14:25–14:27	1.1 mi (1.8 km)	40 yd (37 m)
EF0	A brief tornado was observed without causing damage.							

=== Elsewhere ===
Offshore in the Gulf of Mexico, nine oil production platforms and one drilling rig were damaged. Overall, United States oil production decreased by 2%. On June 25, 44% of the daily oil and 33% of the daily natural gas production in the Gulf of Mexico was shut down. The following day, companies began returning employees to platforms and production was rapidly restored. A man in Orange Beach, Alabama drowned after being swept away by heavy surf. Heavy rainfall from Debby extended northward into southern Georgia, peaking at 12.7 inches (320 mm) in Fargo. Localized and isolated flooding occurred in nearby Lowndes County, with up to 1 foot (0.30 m) of water in the parking lot at a Sonny's restaurant in Lake Park. The remnants of Debby passed about 90 miles (140 km) north of Bermuda on June 29 and produced tropical storm force winds on the island.

== Aftermath ==
Following the storm, U.S. President Barack Obama issued a disaster declaration for Baker, Bradford, Citrus, Clay, Columbia, Duval, Franklin, Gilchrist, Hernando, Highlands, Hillsborough, Lafayette, Manatee, Nassau, Pasco, Pinellas, Polk, Sarasota, Suwannee, Taylor, Union, and Wakulla Counties of Florida. In Citrus County, total individual assistance of $127,000 was paid out to 140 residents, including $112,000 in damage to housing. A total of 1,671 applications for individual assistance were filed in Pinellas County, totaling $900,000.

== See also ==
- Other storms of the same name
- Hurricane Agnes
- Tropical Storm Fay (2008)
- Tropical Storm Henri (2003)
- List of North American tornadoes and tornado outbreaks
- List of tropical cyclones spawning tornadoes
- Weather of 2012

== Sources ==
- Martinaitis, Steven M. (February 1, 2017). "Radar Observations of Tornado-Warned Convection Associated with Tropical Cyclones over Florida". Weather and Forecasting. 32 (1). American Meteorological Society: 165–186. Bibcode:2017WtFor..32..165M. doi:10.1175/WAF-D-16-0105.1. S2CID 125620947.
- Novlan, David J.; Gray, William M. (July 1, 1974). "Hurricane-Spawned Tornadoes". Monthly Weather Review. 102 (7). American Meteorological Society: 476–488. Bibcode:1974MWRv..102..476N. doi:10.1175/1520-0493(1974)102<0476:HST>2.0.CO;2. hdl:10217/270.
