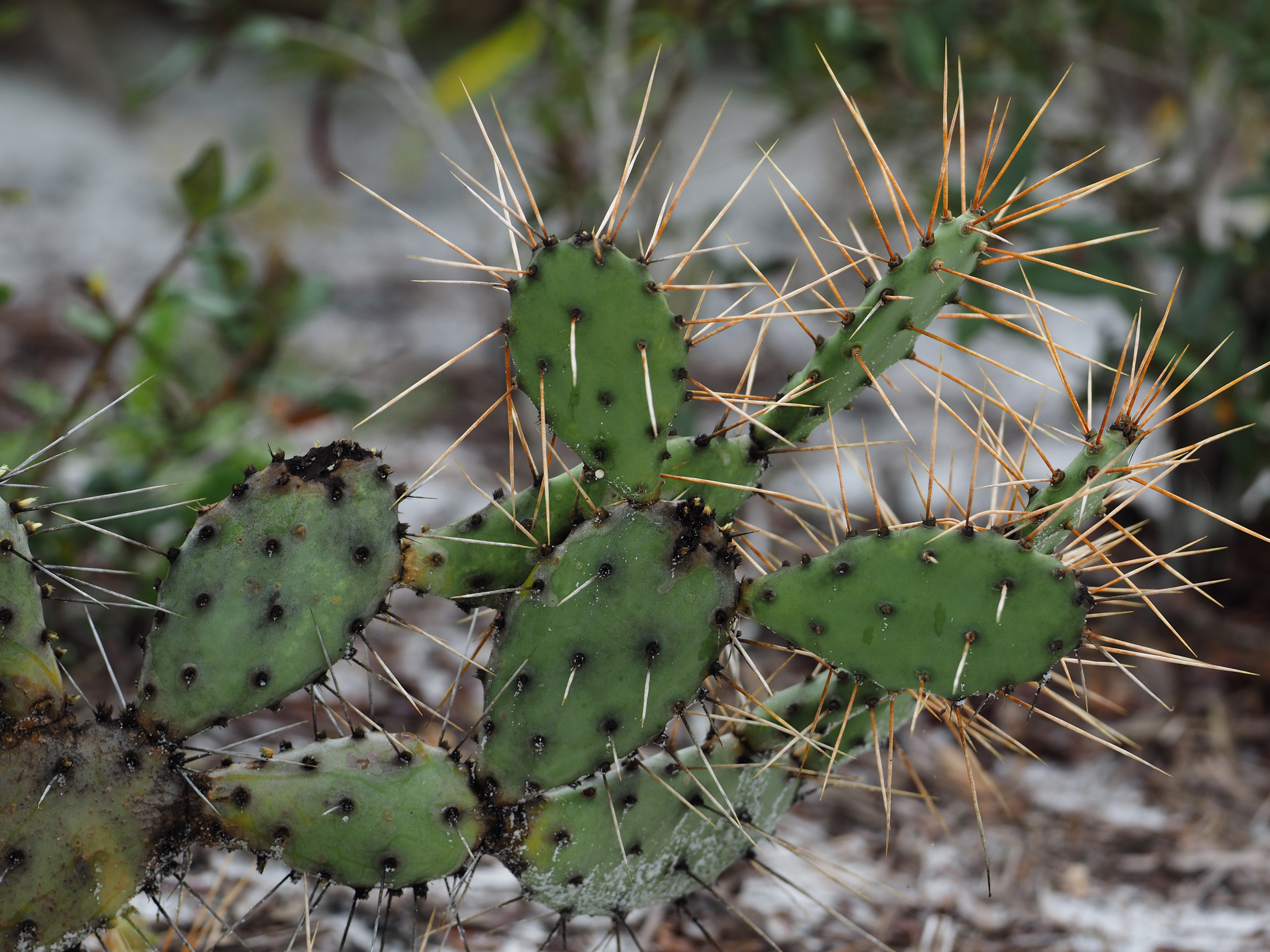
- In Lake June-in-Winter Scrub State Park, Lake Placid, Florida

Conservation status
- Least Concern (IUCN 3.1)

Scientific classification
- Kingdom: Plantae
- Clade: Tracheophytes
- Clade: Angiosperms
- Clade: Eudicots
- Order: Caryophyllales
- Family: Cactaceae
- Genus: Opuntia
- Species: O. austrina

Binomial name
- Opuntia austrina Small
- Range

Synonyms
- Opuntia ammophila; Opuntia atrocapensis; Opuntia compressa var. ammophila; Opuntia compressa var. austrina; Opuntia cumulicola

= Opuntia austrina =

Species of cactus

Opuntia austrina, also known as the Florida prickly pear (with other common names such as the devils-tongue and hammock prickly pear), is a prickly pear cactus species that is endemic to Florida in the United States.

== Description ==
Opuntia austrina has joints (also known as cladodes and pads), which are the segments that grow from the single, cylindrical stem, that are elongated with the length most of the time 2 to 3 times the width. The joints are often dark green in color. Just like other cactus species, O. austrina has spines on the joints and on the stem. O. austrina can grow up to 1 m (3 ft 3 in) in height, which will form large shrubs but can also form small treelets. This cactus' plants are flowering, with yellow flowers that produce red fruits.

== Habitat ==
This species of prickly pear is mostly found in South Florida, in sandy substrates often in brushy dunes inland and mangrove edges on the coast. Other native habitats include scrub, scrubby flatwoods, and xeric, or dry, disturbed areas. The yellow flowers of this cactus attract many pollinators in this ecosystem like bees and other insects including the dotted skipper.

== Conservation ==
This cactus species is considered to be endemic to Florida, but has been also recorded in other states. This species is listed as Least Concern by the IUCN Red List. However, a potential threat is one found in all members of the genus Opuntia – the cactus moth (Cactoblastis cactorum), an invasive species that arrived to Florida in 1989 and has been a serious threat to the cacti in this genus all over North America.
