= Lake Lachard =

Lake in the state of Florida, United States

- Location within Florida Location within the United States
- Location: surrounded by city of Lake Placid, Florida, but not a part of it
- Coordinates: 27°18′15″N 81°22′09″W
- Type: natural freshwater lake
- Basin countries: United States
- Max. length: 650 feet (200 m)
- Max. width: 555 feet (169 m)
- Surface area: 17.89 acres (7 ha)
- Surface elevation: 69 feet (21 m)

Lake Lachard, also spelled Lake La Chard, is an oval-shaped lake that is roughly 0.25 miles (0.40 km) south of the eastern cove of Lake June in Winter. Lake Lachard has a surface area of 17.89-acre (72,400 m^{2}). Lake Lachard is surrounded by the city of Lake Placid, Florida, yet the lake and a small bit of shore surrounding the lake are outside the city limits. Almost the entire shore of the lake is vacant land that in 2013 had been contoured by heavy equipment. On the southeast shore are four residences.

Lake Lachard is completely surrounded by private property, so there is no public access to it. The Take Me Fishing website says the lake contains largemouth bass, bluegill and grass carp.
