= Lake Henry (Florida) =

Lake in the state of Florida, United States

- Location within Florida Location within the United States
- Location: Highlands County, Florida
- Coordinates: 27°19′25″N 81°23′01″W
- Type: natural freshwater lake
- Basin countries: United States
- Max. length: 0.56 miles (0.90 km)
- Max. width: 0.33 miles (0.53 km)
- Surface area: 64 acres (26 ha)
- Surface elevation: 72 feet (22 m)

Lake Henry is a natural freshwater lake in Highlands County, Florida. Lake Henry has a surface area of 64-acre (260,000 m^{2}). It is just to the north of Lake June in Winter, a much larger lake. On its northeast is Lake Henry Drive. The Tomoka Heights retirement subdivision is to its southeast and to its southwest is Lake June Road, which travels along the north shore of Lake June in Winter. More residential housing is to the south and west.

Henry has a park on its shore along Lake Henry Drive. A series of canals run from its south side into residential areas to allow private boat access to the lake. There are no public boat docks or ramps servicing Lake Henry. There are no public swimming areas. Fishing is allowed. The HookandBullet.Com website says Lake Henry has bluegill, crappie and bowfin.
