= Placid Lakes, Florida =

- Unincorporated community
- Location in Highlands County and the state of Florida
- Coordinates: 27°14′28″N 81°24′26″W
- Country: United States
- State: Florida
- County: Highlands

Area
  - Total: 18.32 sq mi (47.4 km^{2})
  - Land: 18.29 sq mi (47.4 km^{2})
  - Water: 0.02 sq mi (0.052 km^{2}) 0.11%
- Elevation: 128 ft (39 m)

Population (2000)
  - Total: 3,054
  - Density: 166.9/sq mi (64.4/km^{2})
- Time zone: UTC-5 (Eastern (EST))
  - Summer (DST): UTC-4 (EDT)
- Area code: 863
- FIPS code: 12-57407
- GNIS feature ID: 2403425

Placid Lakes is an unincorporated community in Highlands County, Florida, United States. The population was 3,054 according to the 2000 census, at which time it was a census-designated place (CDP). Placid Lakes is a predominantly residential community southwest of the town of Lake Placid and due south of Lake June.

== Geography ==
According to the United States Census Bureau, the CDP has a total area of 18.32 square miles (47 km^{2}), of which 18.29 square miles (47 km^{2}) is land and 0.02 square miles (0 km^{2}) (0.11%) is water.

== Demographics ==
As of the census of 2000, there were 3,054 people, 1,344 households, and 990 families residing in the CDP. The population density was 64.5 people/km^{2} (167 people/mi^{2}). There were 1,615 housing units at an average density of 34.1 units/km^{2} (88 units/mi^{2}). The racial makeup of the CDP was 89.69% White, 5.27% African American, 0.79% Native American, 1.05% Asian, 0.03% Pacific Islander, 1.96% from other races, and 1.21% from two or more races. Hispanic or Latino of any race were 10.51% of the population.

There were 1,344 households, out of which 21.1% had children under the age of 18 living with them, 62.6% were married couples living together, 8.6% had a female householder with no husband present, and 26.3% were non-families. 21.9% of all households were made up of individuals, and 15.1% had someone living alone who was 65 years of age or older. The average household size was 2.27 and the average family size was 2.59.

In the CDP, the population was spread out, with 19.0% under the age of 18, 4.4% from 18 to 24, 18.6% from 25 to 44, 22.9% from 45 to 64, and 35.2% who were 65 years of age or older. The median age was 53 years. For every 100 females, there were 92.1 males. For every 100 females age 18 and over, there were 90.7 males.

The median income for a household in the CDP was $31,914, and the median income for a family was $36,925. Males had a median income of $27,222 versus $17,813 for females. The per capita income for the CDP was $18,287. About 4.4% of families and 6.0% of the population were below the poverty line, including 7.0% of those under age 18 and 3.0% of those age 65 or over.

== Geographic features ==
- Lake August
- Lake June-in-Winter
