= Pass-a-Grille =

Neighborhood in Florida, US

Coordinates: 27.6961410°N 82.7373229°W

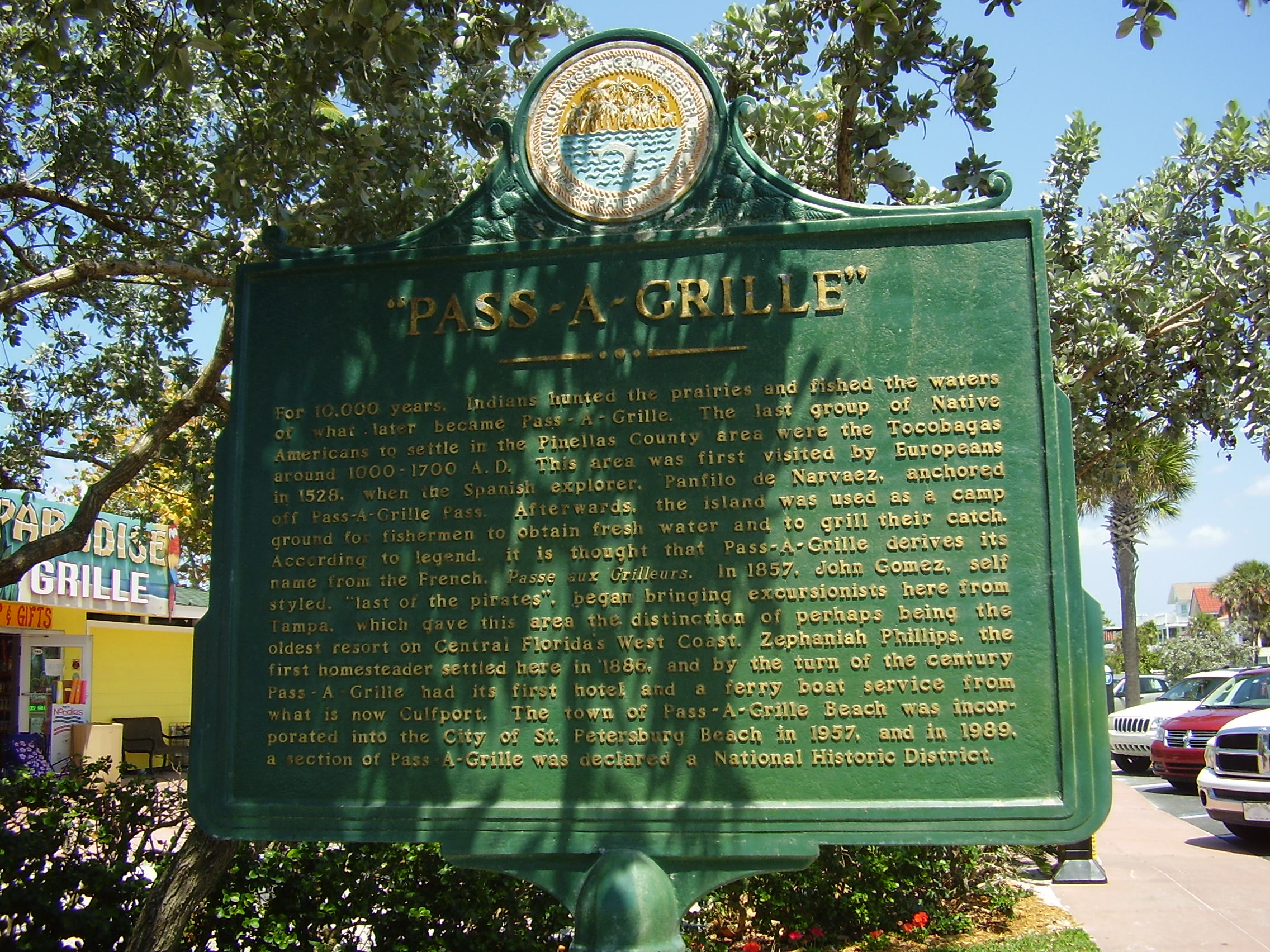
Pass-a-Grille sign

Pass-a-Grille is a small beach neighborhood and former town at the south end of St. Pete Beach in Pinellas County, Florida. The community includes the Pass-a-Grille Historic District, Gulf Beaches Historical Museum, and Pass-A-Grille Beach. The neighborhood includes restaurants, retailers, and waterfront areas on the Gulf of Mexico as well as the Intracoastal Waterway. It lies on a barrier island.

== History ==
The area around Pass-a-Grille has been inhabited by Native Americans for thousands of years and was first spotted by Spanish explorers in 1528 when Pánfilo de Narváez anchored off Pass-a-Grille pass. Local legend states that it was named from the French phrase Passe Aux Grilleurs (the passageway of the grillers) in honor of the fishermen who camped and first settled there. John Gomez was one on the first to use Pass-a-Grille Beach as a vacation area, inviting travelers from St. Petersburg and Tampa to stay at his resort-like structure as early as 1857. Some of the first major businessmen in the area were Roy S. Hanna and Selwyn Morey, who began developing plots of land for homes and lodgings at Pass-a-Grille Beach. By 1901, George Henri Lizotte, a French travel agent, opened the first Pass-a-Grille hotel, the Bonhomie. The first schoolhouse in Pass-a-Grille was built in 1914, for $1,000, and opened its doors to students in the winter of 1915. The Don CeSar hotel opened on the north side of Pass-a-Grille in 1928, spurring more development. Pass-a-Grille was eventually incorporated into the city of St. Pete Beach in 1957, and in 1989 Pass-a-Grille was recognized as a National Register Historic District. The neighborhood suffered damage from Tropical Storm Debby in 2012, including beach erosion and a tornado strike.

== Recreation ==
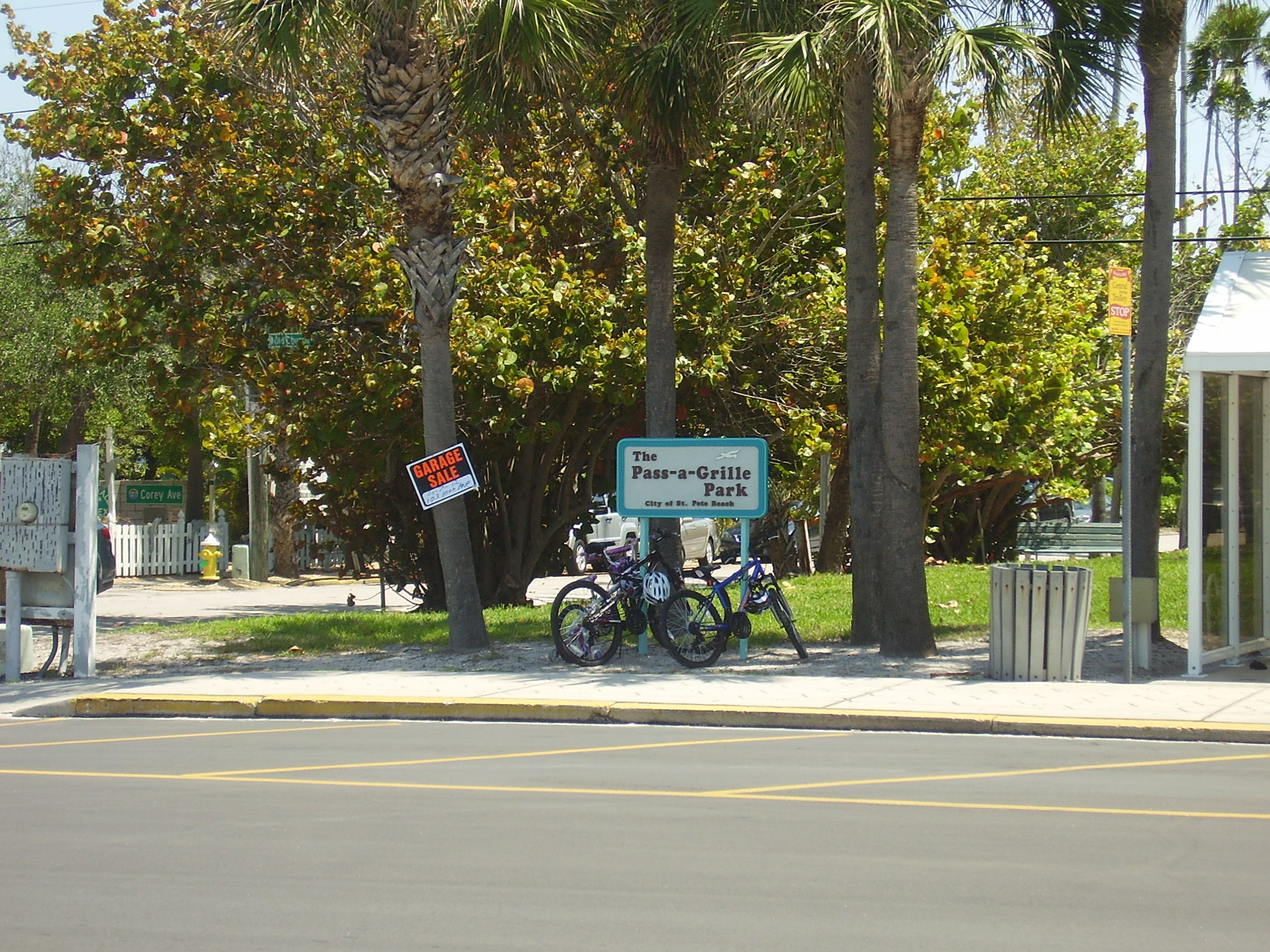
Pass-a-Grille Park

The beach, boutiques, an ice cream shop, an outdoor art market, restaurants, tennis courts, and fishing piers are all within walking distance, concentrated around 8th Street. The Seahorse Grill, open since 1938, serves breakfast. Other popular restaurants include The Hurricane, The Dewey, Grace, and The Brass Monkey. There are two municipal parks: Pass-a-Grille Park, has shuffleboard courts, trees, and lawns; Hurley Park has a dog-park, public toilets, a basketball court, tennis courts, and a baseball diamond. Pass-a-Grille Community Church is the only place of worship in Pass-a-Grille.

== Gallery ==
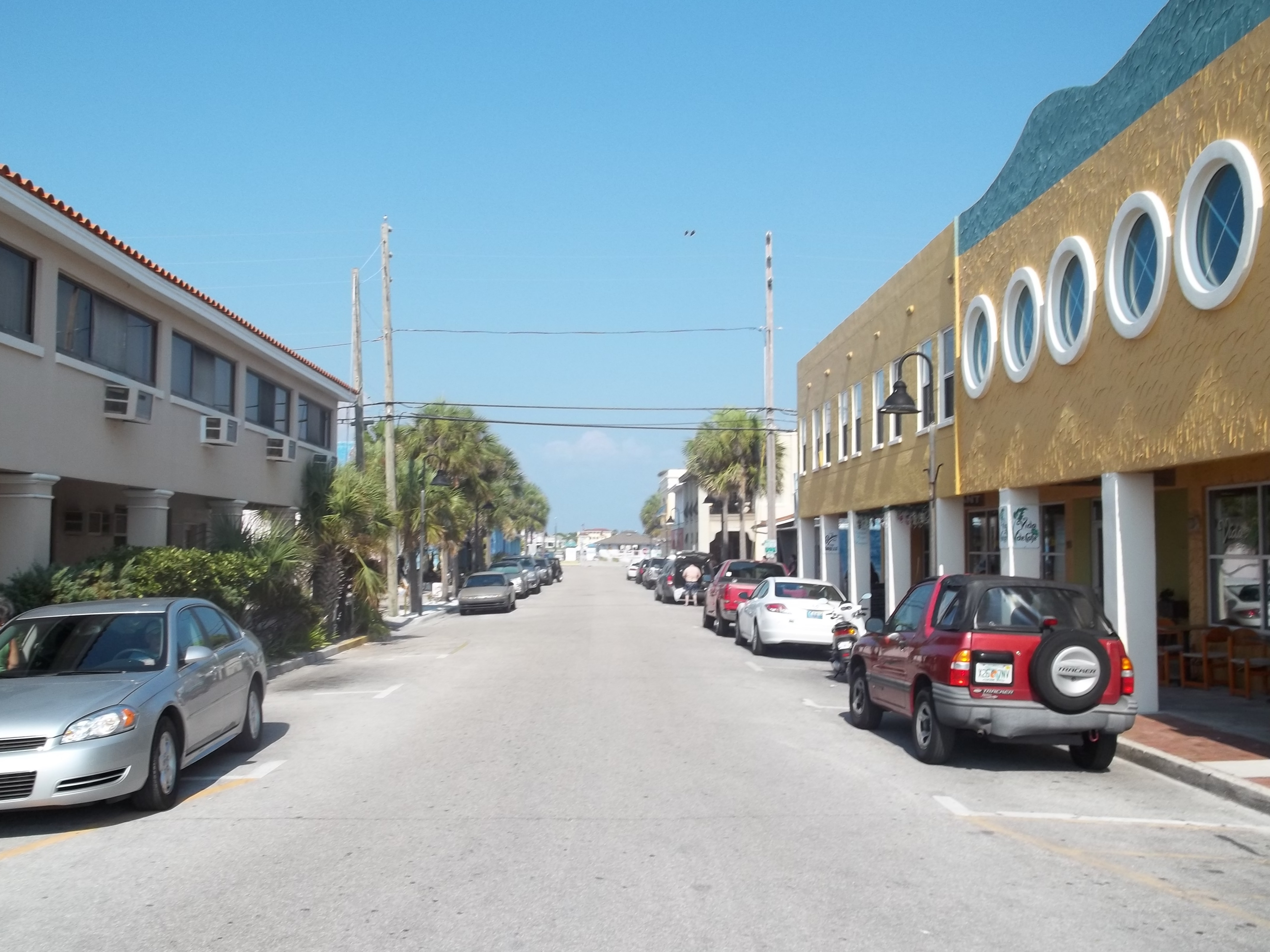

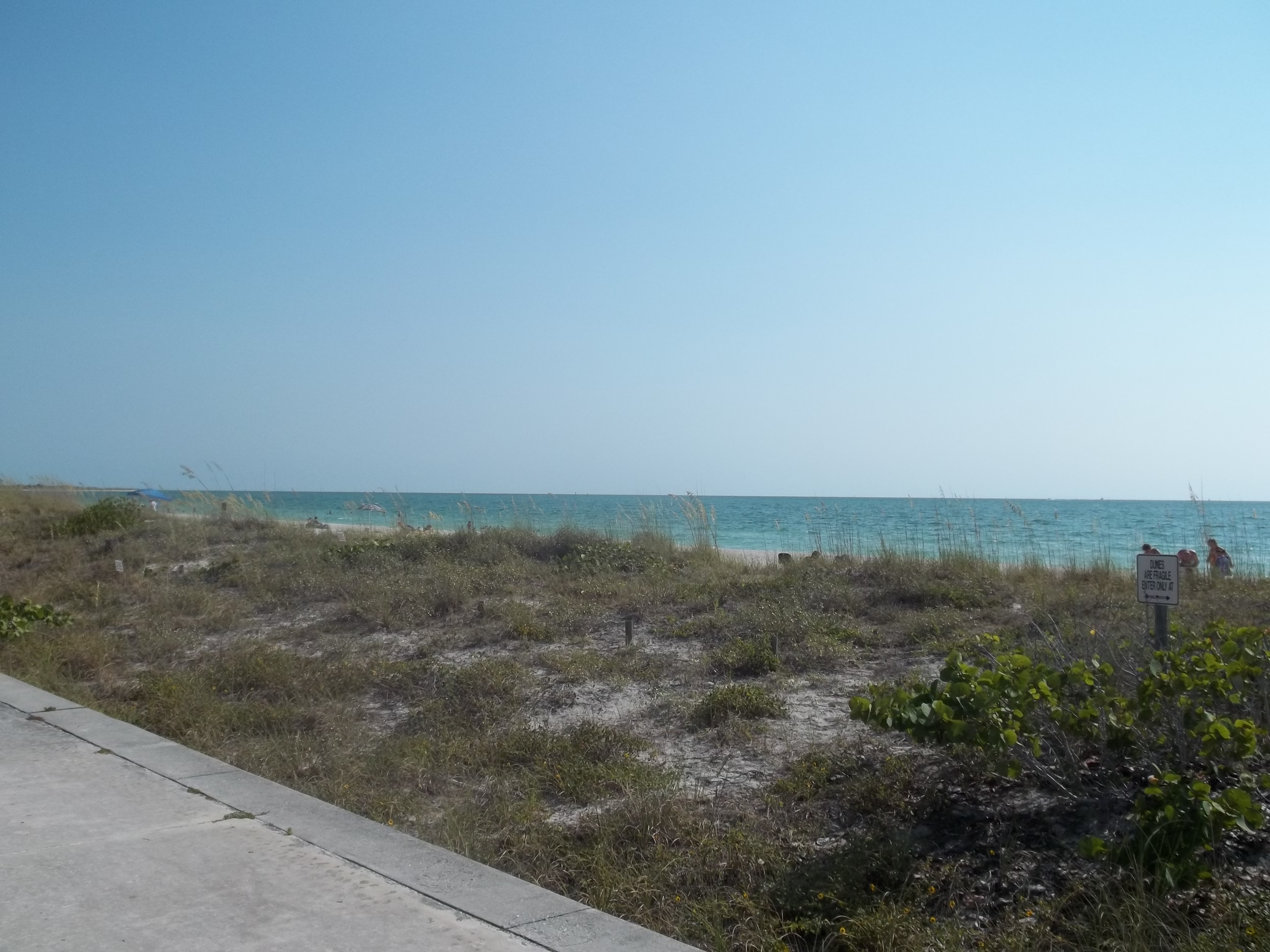

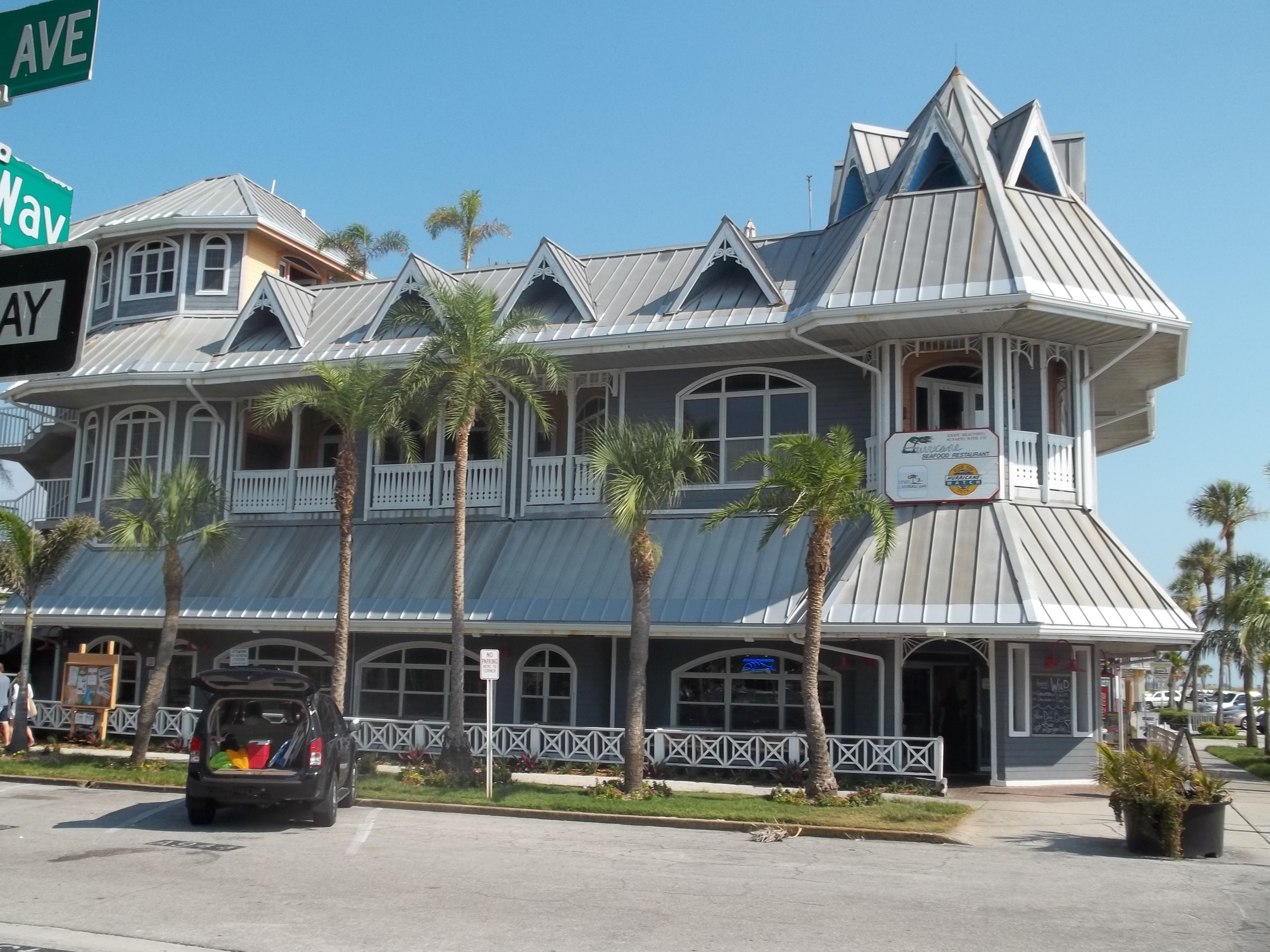

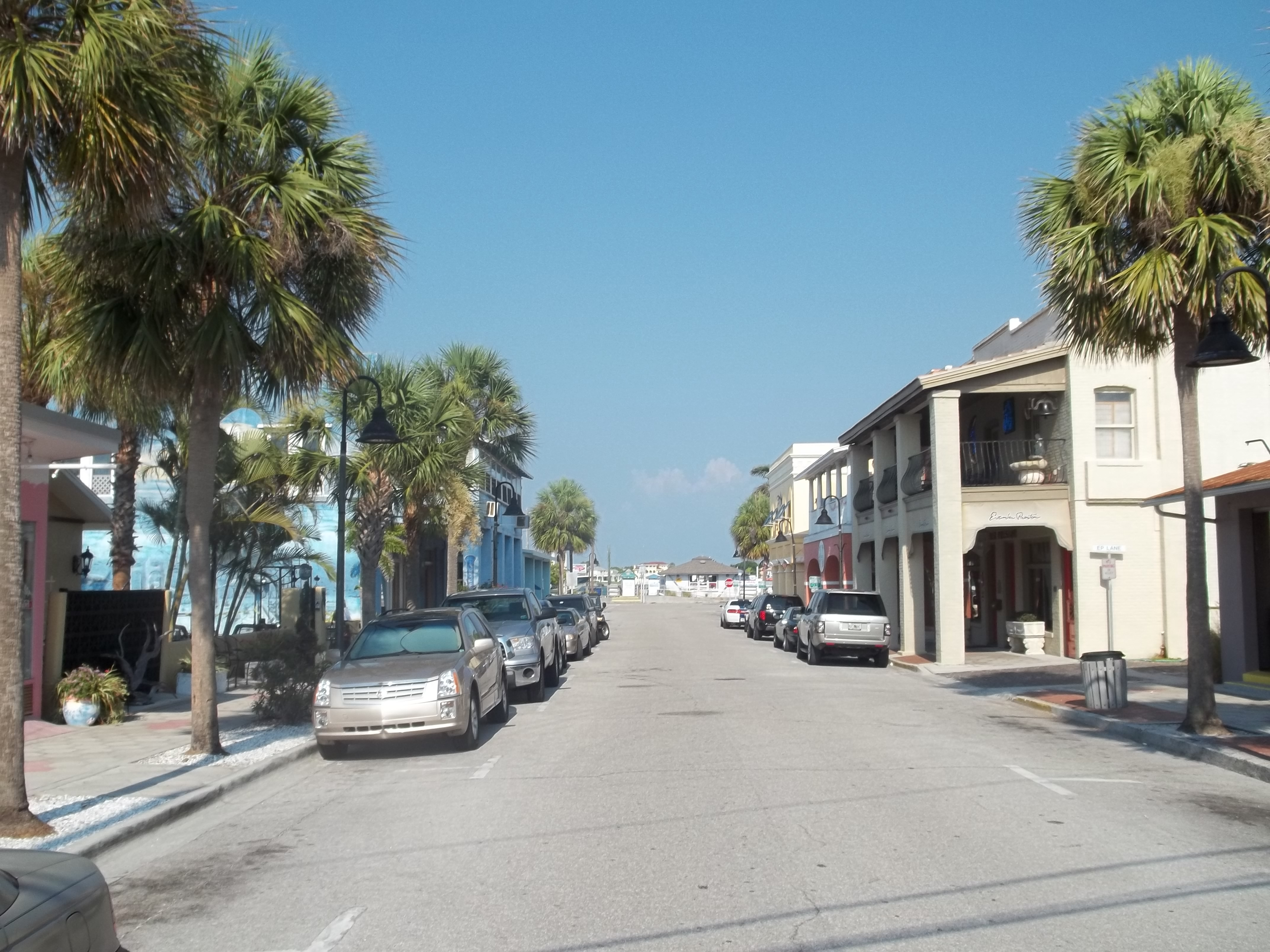

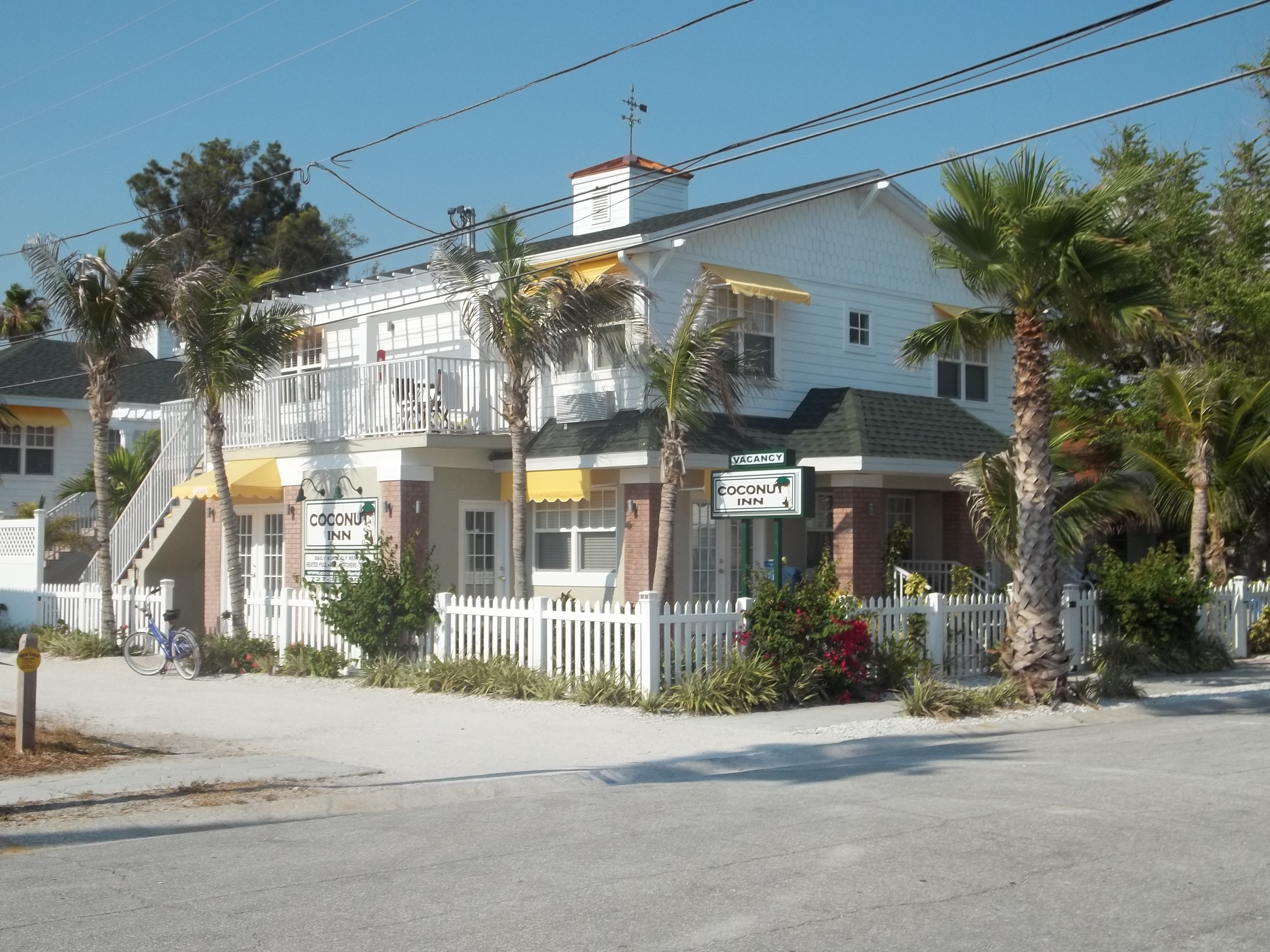

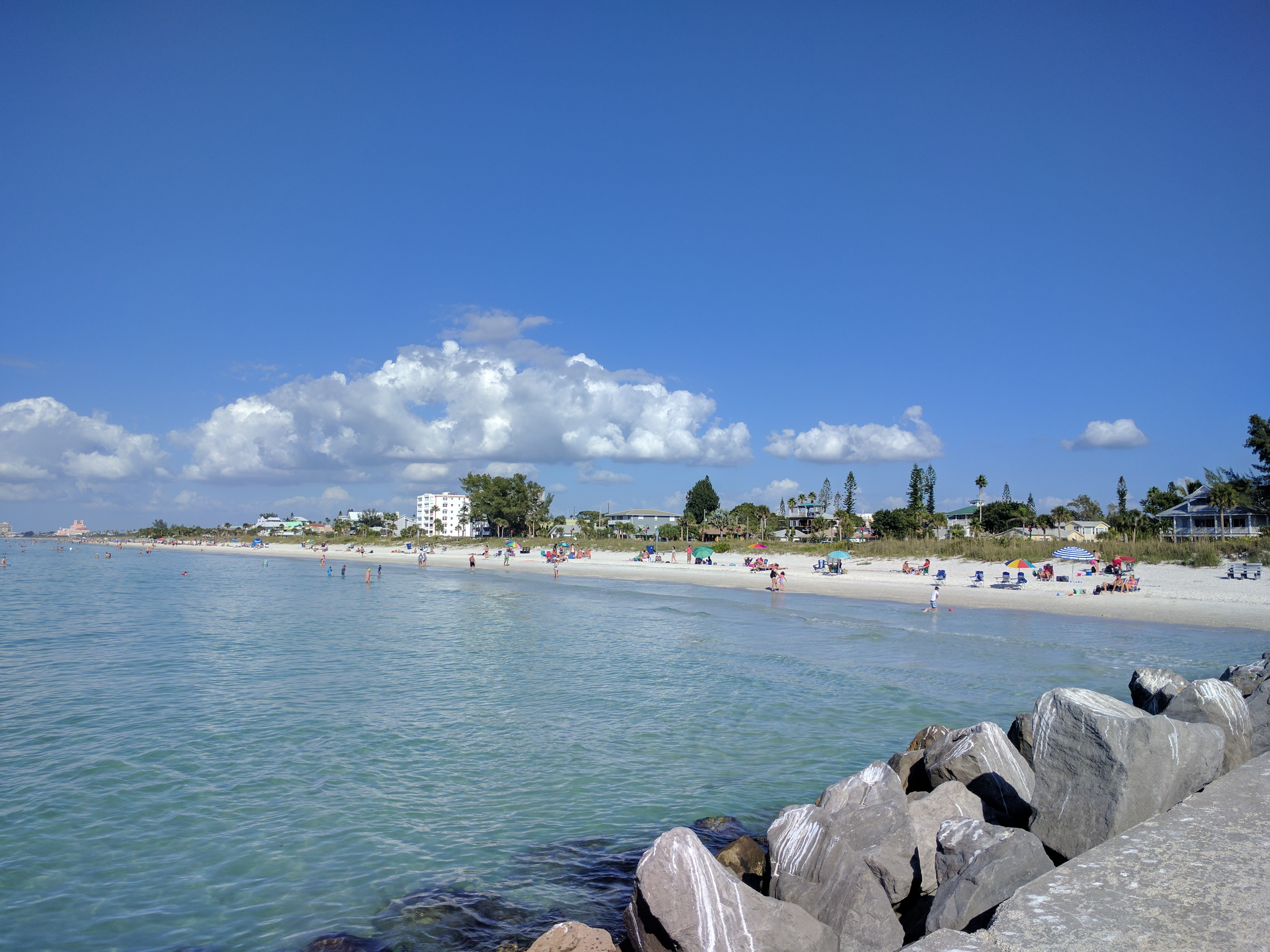

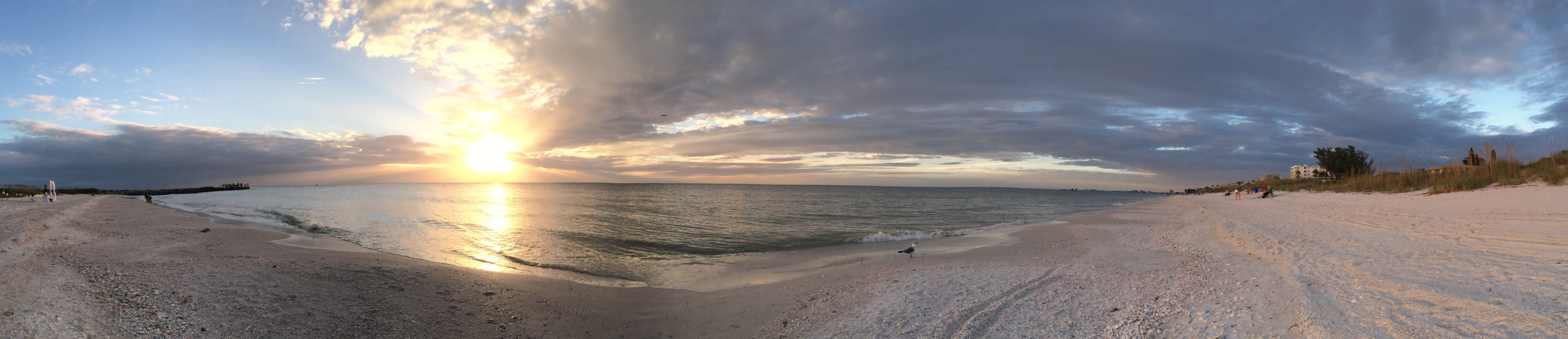
Pass-A-Grille Beach panorama
