= Lake August =

Lake in the state of Florida, United States

- Location within Florida Location within the United States
- Location: Placid Lakes, Florida
- Coordinates: 27°16′30″N 81°24′49″W
- Type: dredged manmade freshwater lake
- Basin countries: United States
- Max. length: 1,805 feet (550 m)
- Max. width: 1,585 feet (483 m)
- Surface area: 52.13 acres (21 ha)
- Surface elevation: 98 feet (30 m)

Lake August has a somewhat round or oval shape. Washington Avenue completely surrounds the residences that almost completely line this lake. This lake, with a 52.13-acre (211,000 m^{2}) surface area, appeared as a swampy area on older topographical maps, indicating it is a dredged man-made lake. It is in Placid Lakes, a large residential area southwest of the town of Lake Placid, Florida.

The public has extremely limited access to Lake August. On the northeast is a narrow point along Washington Blvd. where the lake is met by a small water channel between two residences. This channel travels 0.5 miles (0.80 km) northeast to connect to the much larger Lake June in Winter. The channel can not be travelled by boat, as it in most places it is extremely shallow and also passes through culverts under Washington and another road. The public could fish at this narrow point, but there are no public boat ramps or swimming areas on Lake August.
