= Lake June in Winter Scrub State Park =

State park in Florida, United States

- IUCN category V (protected landscape/seascape)
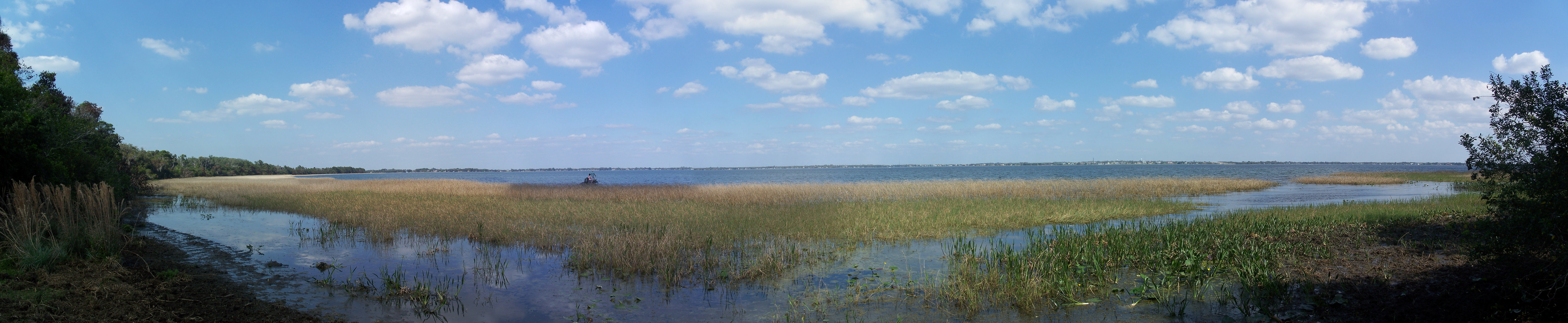
- Lake June in Winter

- Location within Florida Location within the United States
- Interactive map of Lake June in Winter Scrub State Park
- Location: Highlands County, Florida, USA
- Nearest city: Lake Placid, Florida
- Coordinates: 27°17′11″N 81°24′44″W
- Governing body: Florida Department of Environmental Protection

Lake June in Winter Scrub State Park is a Florida State Park, located approximately seven miles southwest of Lake Placid. This park occupies the entire western shore of Lake June in Winter.

== Conservation ==
Park staff and volunteers have removed sand pines and used prescribed burns to restore habitat for the Florida scrub-jay.

== Admission and Hours ==
There is a $2.00 per vehicle entrance fee. Florida state parks are open between 8 a.m. and sundown every day of the year (including holidays).
