= Bayway Isles =

Neighborhood in St. Petersburg, Florida, United States

Coordinates: 27.713°N 82.697°W

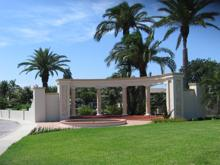
Fountain at Bayway Isles

Bayway Isles is a residential neighborhood consisting of two islands in the southwestern part of the city of St. Petersburg, Florida. The islands are home to almost 200 families. The community extends southward from the Pinellas Bayway causeway into the waters of southern Boca Ciega Bay. Bayway Isles is a guarded, deed-restricted community.

The community began in 1964 as a joint development of Bayway Development and Leeco Gas and Oil Corporation. In 1968 the State of Florida designated the surrounding waters of Boca Ciega Bay as an Aquatic Preserve, thus limiting future 'dredge and fill' operations in the Bay. In 1972 the remainder of Pinellas County was similarly designed as an aquatic preserve. Bayway Isles is thus one of the last sets of artificial fill islands to be built in Pinellas County. In 1986, new home construction started on the island of Bayway Isles Unit II.

Architectural design throughout the community is varied; styles range from Mediterranean Revival to Florida Modern.

Homeowners range from small families to retirees. The neighborhood is located adjacent to Isla Del Sol, Fort DeSoto Park, St. Pete Beach and Eckerd College.

Bayway Isles street boundaries are 56th to 62nd Avenues South from 49th to 54th Streets South.
