= St. Pete Beach, Florida =

City in Florida, United States

- City
- City of St. Pete Beach
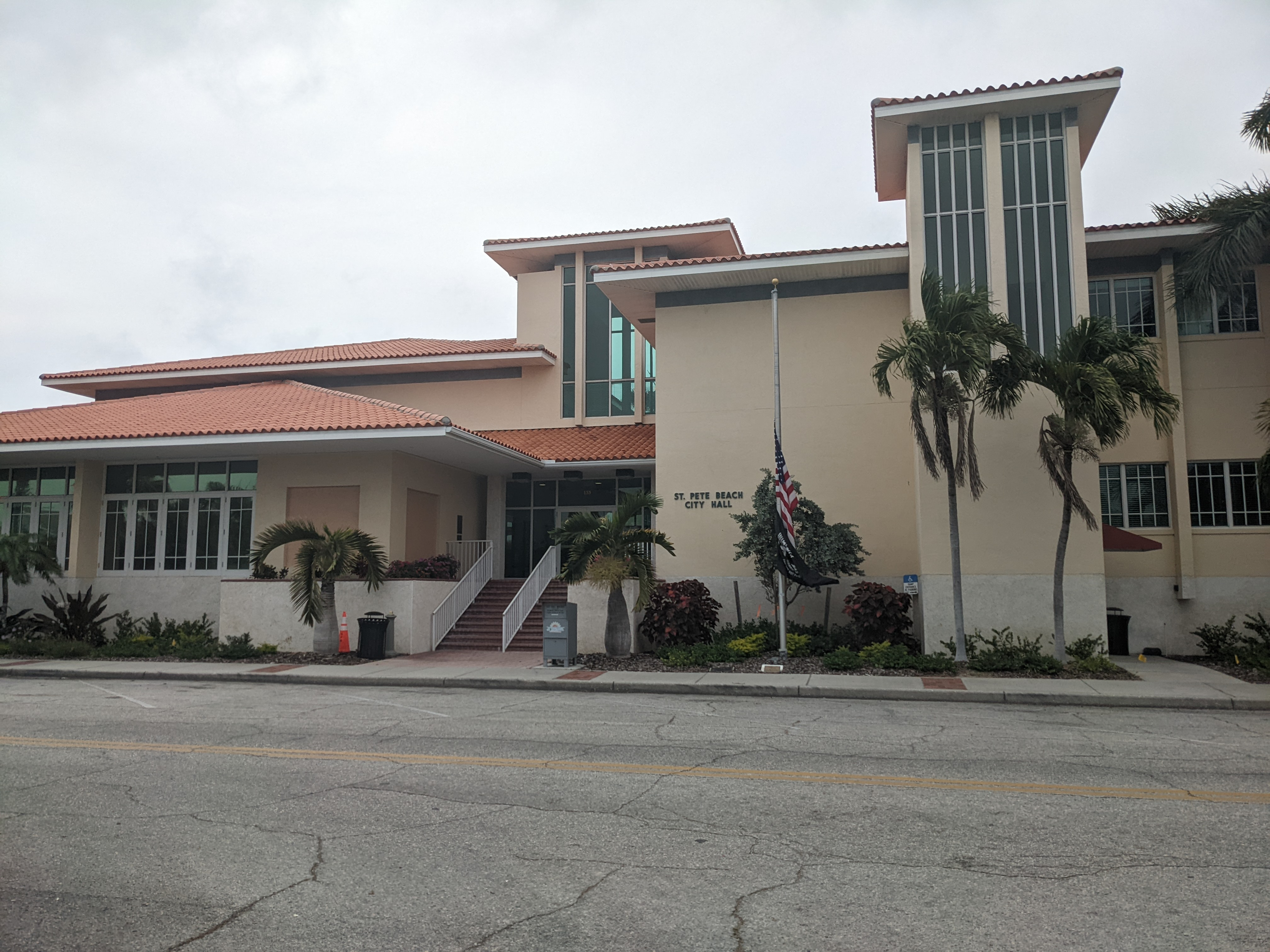
- St. Pete Beach city hall in 2022

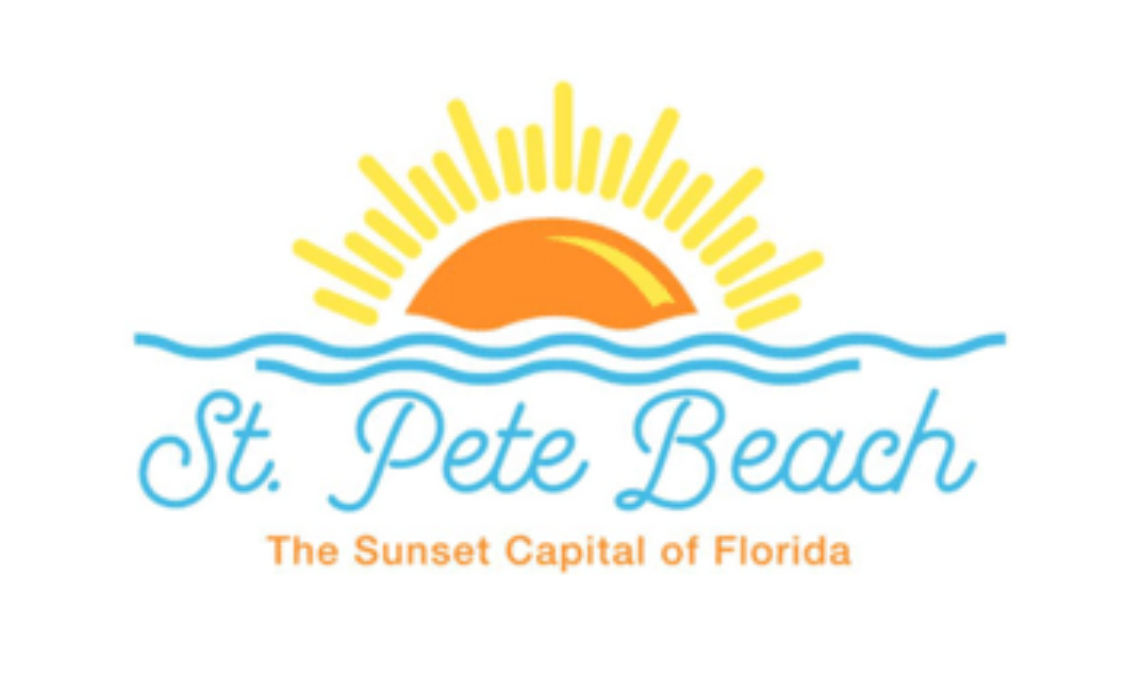
- Flag
- Motto: The Sunset Capital of Florida
- Location in Pinellas County and the state of Florida
- Coordinates: 27°44′11″N 82°44′51″W
- Country: United States
- State: Florida
- County: Pinellas
- Incorporated (City of St. Petersburg Beach): 1957; 69 years ago
- Incorporated (City of St. Pete Beach): March 9, 1994

Government
  - Type: Commission–Manager
  - Mayor: Adrian Petrila
  - Vice Mayor: Mark Grill
  - Commissioners: Christopher Graus, Ward Friszolowski, and Chris Marone
  - City Manager: Wayne Saunders
  - City Clerk: Amber LaRowe

Area
  - Total: 6.97 sq mi (18.04 km^{2})
  - Land: 2.13 sq mi (5.51 km^{2})
  - Water: 4.84 sq mi (12.53 km^{2})
- Elevation: 0 ft (0 m)

Population (2020)
  - Total: 8,879
  - Density: 4,175.9/sq mi (1,612.32/km^{2})
- Time zone: UTC-5 (Eastern (EST))
  - Summer (DST): UTC-4 (EDT)
- ZIP Code: 33706
- Area code: 727
- FIPS code: 12-62885
- GNIS feature ID: 2405400
- Sales Tax: 7%
- Property Tax: 3.1500 City (17.0318 Total)
- Website: www.stpetebeach.org

St. Pete Beach or Saint Pete Beach (officially St. Petersburg Beach until 1994) is a coastal city in Pinellas County, Florida. Known as a tourist destination, St. Pete Beach was formed from the towns of Pass-a-Grille, Belle Vista, St. Petersburg Beach, and unincorporated Pinellas County. It is part of the Tampa Bay area. The population was 8,879 at the 2020 census.

St. Pete Beach's downtown is centered on Corey Avenue. This district contains bars, restaurants and shopping and retail outlets. The Pass-a-Grille Historic District and the historic Don CeSar beach resort are located at the southern end of the beach.

== History ==
The town of St. Pete Beach was consolidated from the municipalities of Pass-a-Grille, Don CeSar Place, Belle Vista, and St. Petersburg Beach in a 1957 referendum, in which consolidation won by a five-vote margin. At the time of its incorporation in 1957, its name was St. Petersburg Beach. On March 9, 1994, locals voted to change the official name to the shorter version of St. Pete Beach, to distinguish it from the city of St. Petersburg a few miles to the east.

== Geography ==
St. Pete Beach is located at 27°43′29″N 82°44′31″W (27.724587, –82.741850). According to the U.S. Census Bureau, the city has a total area of 19.9 square miles (52 km^{2}), of which 2.2 square miles (5.7 km^{2}) is land and 17.6 square miles (46 km^{2}) (88.68%) is water.

St. Pete Beach occupies the entire space of Long Key, a barrier island at the east central edge of the Gulf of Mexico. Three bridges lead into the city, connecting it to Treasure Island, South Pasadena and the Bayway Isles area of St. Petersburg. St. Pete Beach is located about 20 miles (32 km) south of Clearwater Beach.

== Demographics ==
Historical population
Census	Pop.	Note	%±
1950	722		—
1960	6,268		768.1%
1970	8,024		28.0%
1980	9,354		16.6%
1990	9,200		−1.6%
2000	9,929		7.9%
2010	9,346		−5.9%
2020	8,879		−5.0%
U.S. Decennial Census

=== Racial and ethnic composition ===
St. Pete Beach racial composition (Hispanics excluded from racial categories) (NH = Non-Hispanic)
Race	Pop 2010	Pop 2020	% 2010	% 2020
White (NH)	8,643	7,958	92.48%	89.63%
Black or African American (NH)	64	55	0.68%	0.62%
Native American or Alaska Native (NH)	23	13	0.25%	0.15%
Asian (NH)	106	118	1.13%	1.33%
Pacific Islander or Native Hawaiian (NH)	3	6	0.03%	0.07%
Some other race (NH)	14	21	0.15%	0.24%
Two or more races/Multiracial (NH)	81	266	0.87%	3.00%
Hispanic or Latino (any race)	412	442	4.41%	4.98%
Total	9,346	8,879		

=== 2020 census ===
As of the 2020 census, St. Pete Beach had a population of 8,879. The median age was 60.4 years. 6.4% of residents were under the age of 18 and 38.5% of residents were 65 years of age or older. For every 100 females there were 95.9 males, and for every 100 females age 18 and over there were 95.5 males age 18 and over.

100.0% of residents lived in urban areas, while 0.0% lived in rural areas.

There were 4,979 households in St. Pete Beach, of which 8.4% had children under the age of 18 living in them. Of all households, 43.8% were married-couple households, 22.7% were households with a male householder and no spouse or partner present, and 26.7% were households with a female householder and no spouse or partner present. About 40.2% of all households were made up of individuals and 20.1% had someone living alone who was 65 years of age or older.

There were 8,036 housing units, of which 38.0% were vacant. The homeowner vacancy rate was 2.9% and the rental vacancy rate was 15.2%.

In 2020, there were 2,938 families residing in the city.

=== 2010 census ===
As of the 2010 United States census, there were 9,346 people, 4,844 households, and 2,512 families residing in the city.

=== 2000 census ===
As of the census of 2000, there were 9,929 people, 5,294 households, and 2,726 families residing in the city. The population density was 4,417.8 inhabitants per square mile (1,705.7/km^{2}). There were 7,817 housing units at an average density of 3,478.1 per square mile (1,342.9/km^{2}). The racial makeup of the city was 97.61% White, 0.66% African American, 0.55% Asian, 0.22% Native American, 0.03% Pacific Islander, 0.34% from other races, and 0.57% from two or more races. Hispanic or Latino of any race were 2.51% of the population. In the 2000 census, St. Pete Beach had the largest proportion of residents who were Lithuanian-American in Florida (3.3 percent).

In 2000, there were 5,294 households, out of which 10.4% had children under the age of 18 living with them, 44.2% were married couples living together, 5.3% had a female householder with no husband present, and 48.5% were non-families. 40.6% of all households were made up of individuals, and 18.1% had someone living alone who was 65 years of age or older. The average household size was 1.82 and the average family size was 2.40.

In 2000, in the city, the population was spread out, with 9.7% under the age of 18, 3.3% from 18 to 24, 22.6% from 25 to 44, 31.3% from 45 to 64, and 33.1% who were 65 years of age or older. The median age was 54 years. For every 100 females, there were 99.3 males. For every 100 females age 18 and over, there were 97.9 males.

In 2000, the median income for a household in the city was $47,574, and the median income for a family was $61,434. Males had a median income of $40,938 versus $30,532 for females. The per capita income for the city was $35,514. About 3.7% of families and 7.4% of the population were below the poverty line, including 9.5% of those under age 18 and 4.6% of those age 65 or over.

== Education ==
Residents are zoned to Pinellas County Schools, specifically the schools of Azalea Elementary School, Madeira Beach Middle School, and Boca Ciega High School.

In 1915 Sunshine Elementary School opened in Pass-a-Grille. Gulf Beaches Elementary opened in 1950. The Tampa Bay Times said that Gulf Beaches "quickly absorbed most of the kids from Sunshine". Sunshine Elementary School closed on June 6, 1975. The Gulf Beaches School absorbed the traditions of the Sunshine school, including the fish broil fundraiser.

On January 14, 2009, the Pinellas County school board voted 7–0 to close several schools, including Gulf Beaches Elementary School. When the school was in operation, it had annual fish broils. Linda Chaney, the commissioner of St. Pete Beach, and Mary Maloof, the mayor of Treasure Island, had asked the school board not to close Gulf Beaches. The Gulf Beaches campus, which is located on 4.7-acre (1.9 ha) of land in St. Pete Beach, had been closed after the school board faced budget cuts. In addition the year-round population of children had decreased. In 2014, the Pinellas County School Board announced Gulf Beaches would be reopened for the 2014–2015 school year as a technology magnet school.

== Library ==
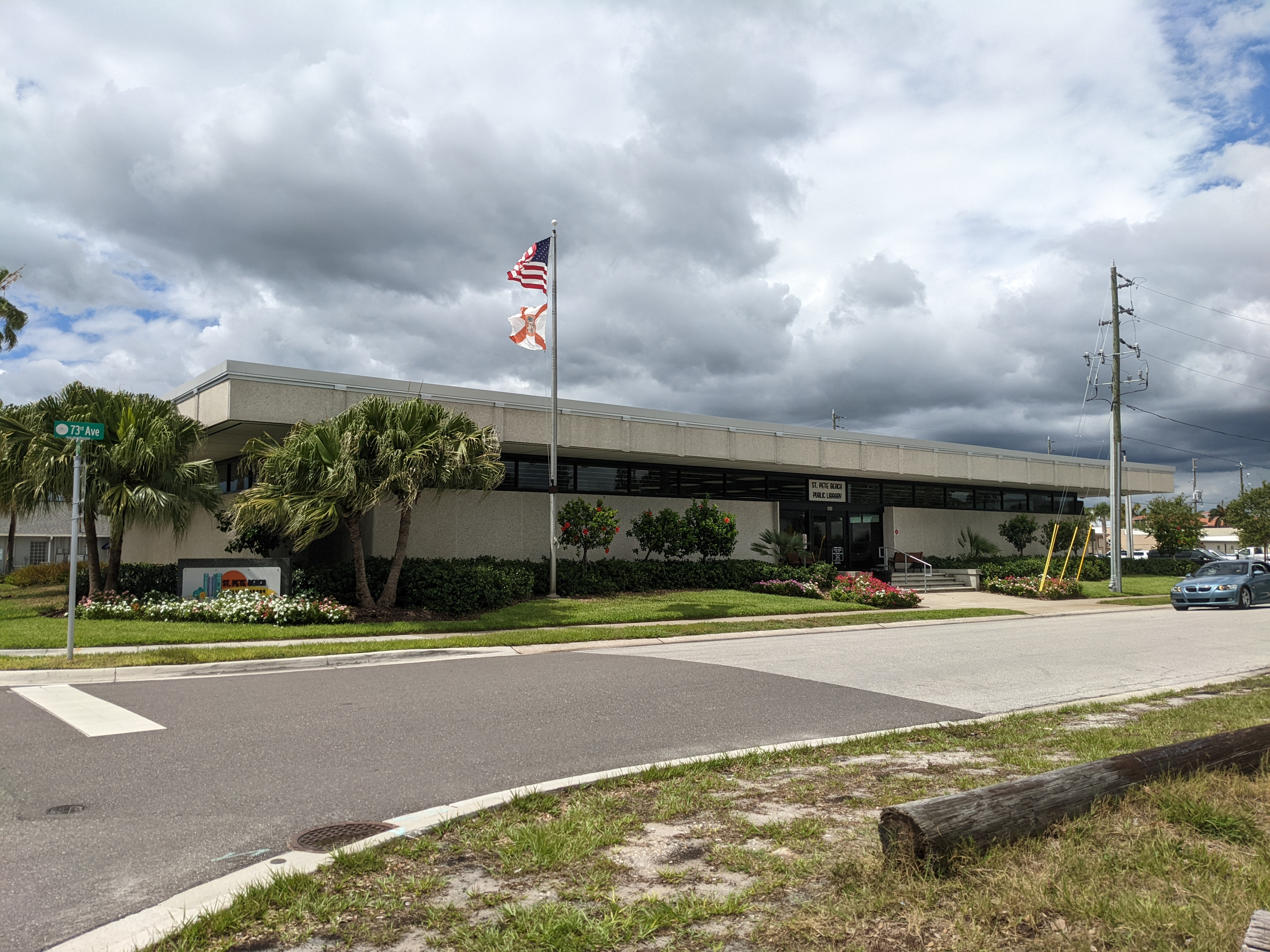
St. Pete Beach Public Library in 2022

The St. Pete Beach Public Library is the public library that serves the city of St. Pete Beach and the greater Pinellas area. The library was founded in 1951 by the St. Petersburg Beach Community Club inside their clubhouse with "450 books on two shelves". The library grew to include "200 adult and 200 children's books" from the Florida State Library Extension Service.

In 1957, it became a municipal library when the city of St. Pete Beach was incorporated allowing the St. Petersburg Beach Community Club to turn operations over to the city. In 1968, the Friends of the St. Pete Beach Public Library was formed raising over $26,000 for a new library building.

On July 7, 1969, the St. Pete Beach Library opened an eight thousand two hundred square feet (760 m^{2}) building designed by architect Glenn Q. Johnson at 365 73rd Avenue. The building was partially refurbished in 1995, and underwent a major renovation in 2020–2021. A member of the Pinellas Public Library Cooperative since 1989, the library was temporarily relocated to 7470 Gulf Boulevard during the renovation. On March 26, 2021, the St. Pete Beach Library reopened after a $2.6 million restoration and renovation.

== Tourism ==
St. Pete Beach is a popular seaside tourist destination. In 2021, TripAdvisor named St. Pete Beach the number one beach in the US, and the number five best beach in the entire world to visit.

The Don Cesar is a renowned and historic hotel, opened in 1928. It is located on the Gulf in St. Pete Beach. The Don Cesar is a member of the Historic Hotels of America.

== Notable people ==
- Chuck Hiller, baseball player
