= Pass-a-Grille Historic District =

Historic district in Florida, United States

- U.S. National Register of Historic Places
- U.S. Historic district
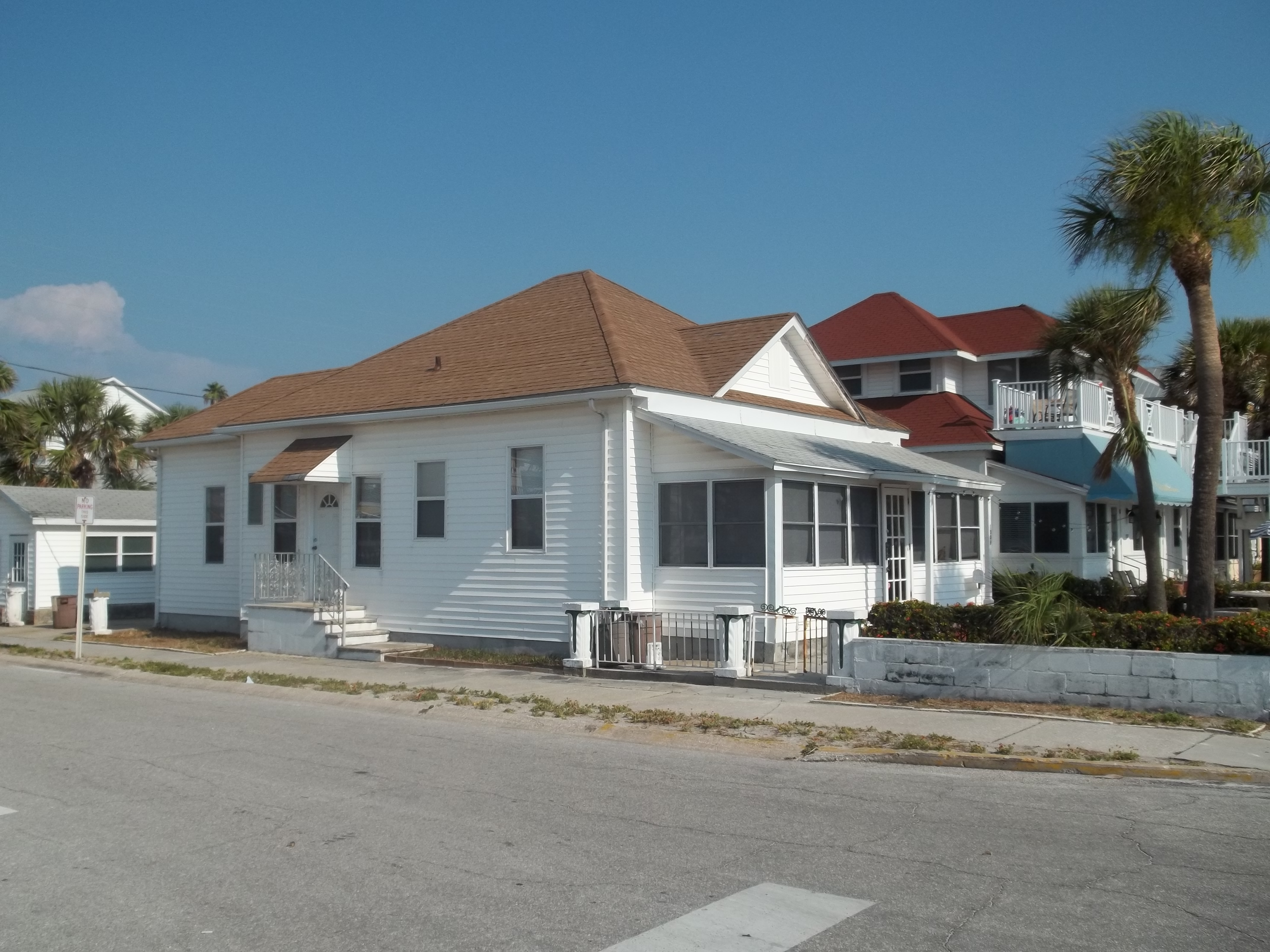
- (2011)

- Location within Florida Location within the United States
- Location: St. Pete Beach, Florida
- Coordinates: 27°41′17″N 82°44′14″W
- Area: 400 acres (1.6 km^{2}); 1,160 acres (4.7 km^{2})(increase)
- NRHP reference No.: 89001734 (original); 03000943 (increase)

Significant dates
- Added to NRHP: October 19, 1989
- Boundary increase: September 15, 2003

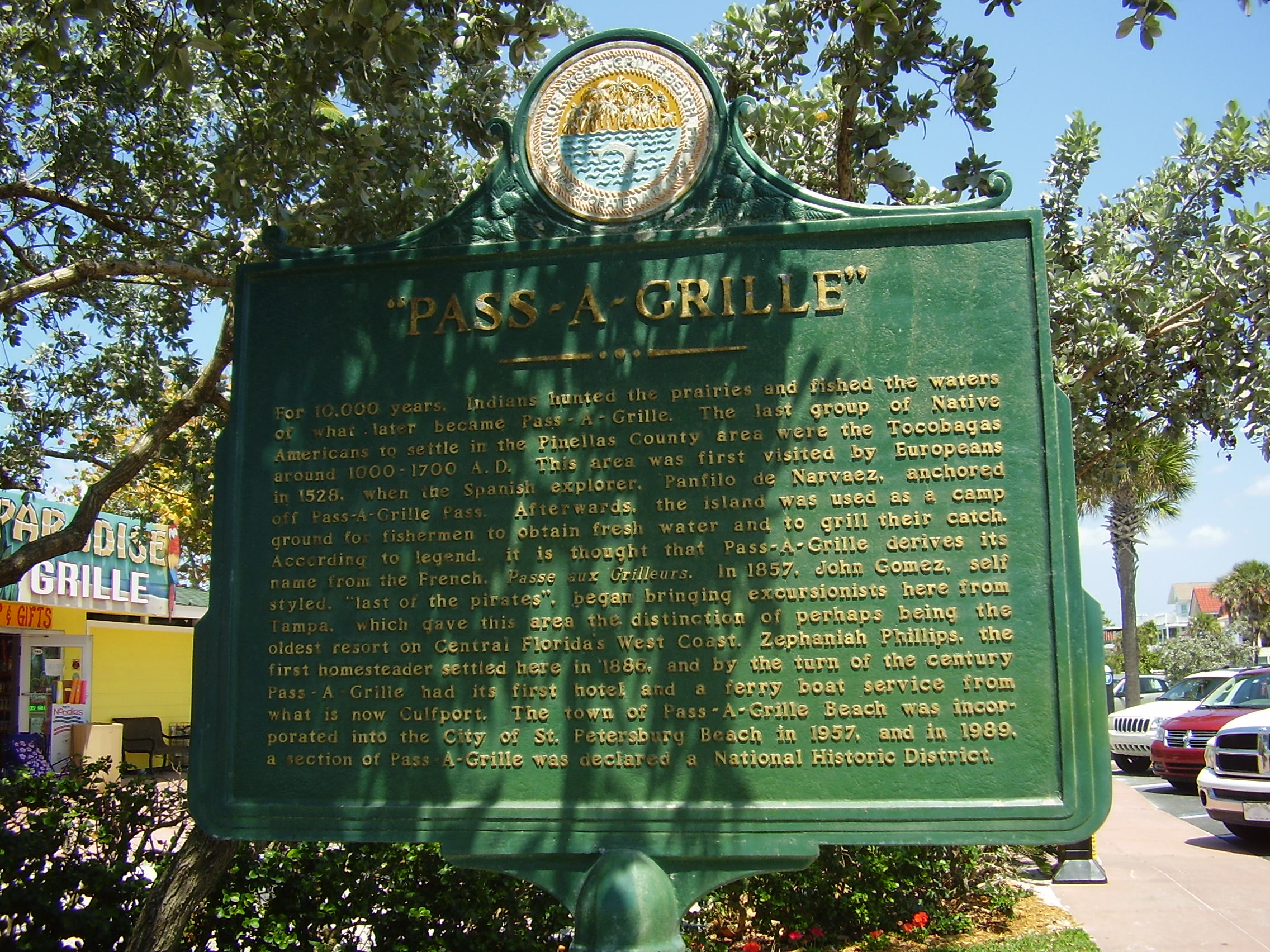
Pass-a-Grille Historic District sign

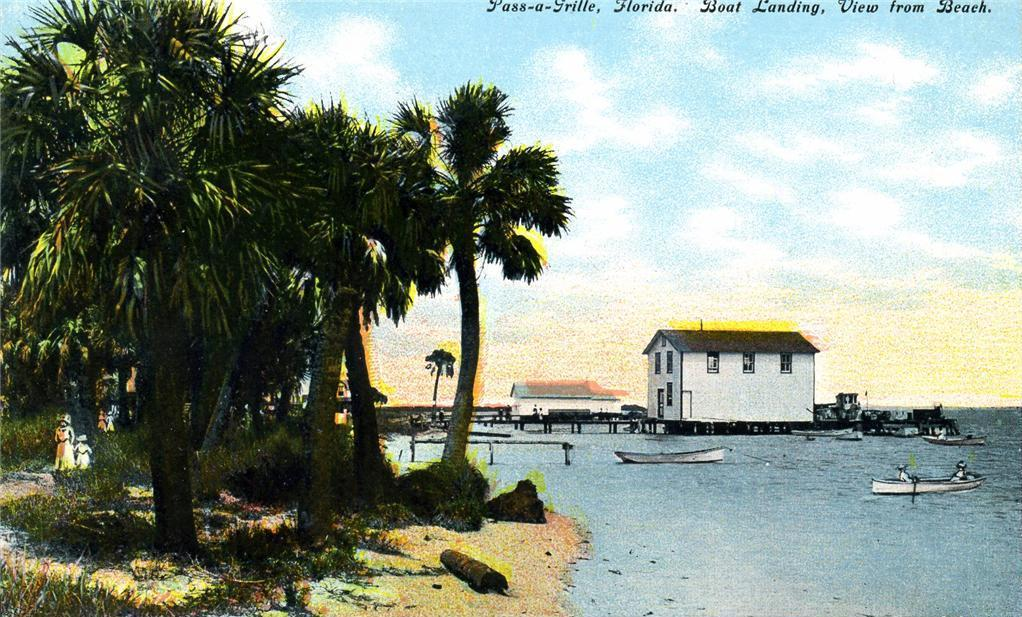
Boat landing from beach in 1911

The Pass-a-Grille Historic District (also known as Old Town of Pass-a-Grille) is a U.S. historic district (designated as such on October 19, 1989) located in the town of Pass-a-Grille at the southern end of St. Pete Beach, Florida. The district is bounded by 12th Avenue, Gulf Boulevard, 4th Avenue, and Gulf Avenue. It contains 97 historic buildings.

On September 15, 2003, the area was expanded to include an area bounded by Pass-a-Grille Way, 1st Avenue, Gulf Way, Sunset Way, and 32nd Avenue. The new area contained contains 354 more historic buildings.

The Gulf Beaches Historical Museum is a museum of local history that is located in the district in the former Pass-a-Grille Community Church.
