= Lake June in Winter =

Lake in the state of Florida, United States

- Location within Florida Location within the United States
- Location: North of Lake Placid, Florida
- Coordinates: 27°18′01″N 81°23′59″W
- Type: Natural freshwater lake
- Basin countries: United States
- Max. length: 2.44 miles (3.93 km)
- Max. width: 1.4 miles (2.3 km)
- Surface area: 3,726.11 acres (1,508 ha)
- Max. depth: 40 feet (12 m)
- Surface elevation: 72 feet (22 m)

Lake June in Winter, on the west side of Lake Placid, Florida, has a surface area of 3,726.11-acre (15,079,000 m^{2}). The lake is also written "Lake June-in-Winter" and was once known as Lake Stearns. It is kidney-shaped, with coves on the northeast and northwest.

Lake June is bordered on the south, part of the east, and much of the north with residences and residential areas. All of the western shore is bordered by Lake June in Winter Scrub State Park. Other areas are bordered by vacant areas of scrub and grassland. Two nearby lakes, Lake Henry and Lake Lachard, are nearby.

Lake June has public access along a substantial part of its shoreline. Lake June-in-Winter Scrub State Park borders the entire west side of the lake. The park has trails and a picnic area with tables and a shelter. The description of the park on the Florida State Park website says the public is allowed to fish from shore and launch canoes or kayaks from shore. The lake has two other public parks on its shores. One is the Lake June Park Sports Complex, at the south side of the northeast cove. That park has softball diamonds, picnic tables, a swimming beach, and a public boat ramp. The other park is nearly opposite the sports complex, on the north side of the same cove. That is H. L. Bishop Park, with picnic tables, a fishing dock, and a public boat ramp.

Two canals connect to area lakes. The one connecting to Lake August, to the south, can not be navigated. The other going north from the northwest cove connects to Lake Carrie. According to the Take Me Fishing web site, Lake June contains largemouth bass and bluegill.
