= Spring Lake, Highlands County, Florida =

Unincorporated community in Florida, U.S.

Coordinates: 28°30′14″N 82°18′11″W

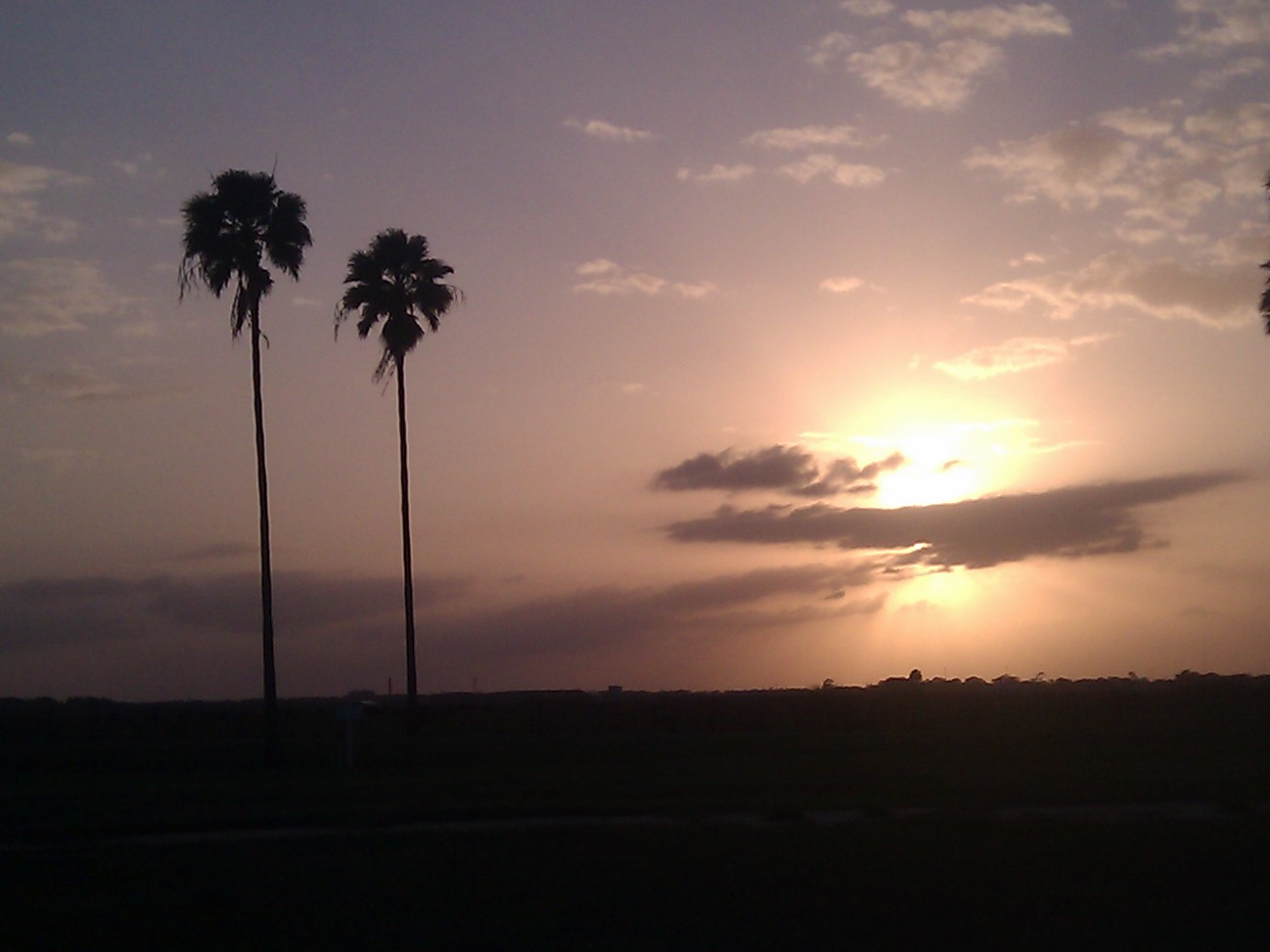
Sunset at Spring Lake Golf Resort, March 2012

Spring Lake is an unincorporated community in Highlands County, Florida, United States, southeast of Sebring, just outside the city limits of Sebring, adjacent to the Sebring International Raceway. It is mostly made up of senior citizens and families with children, and Sebring International Golf Resort consists of three different golf courses.

The Spring Lake community has its own Property Association and its own Board of Directors.

== Geography ==
Bordered by Lake Istokpoga, Florida's second largest lake, the community of Spring Lake is mostly flat, and consists of canals and golf course lots. The resort offers the guests and residents the ability to experience much of Florida's natural beauty. The typical lot size within the Spring Lake Golf Resort is 0.25 acres, and approximately 50 percent of the lots back up to either a golf course fairway, golf course green, or a canal.

== Sebring International Golf Resort Info ==
Previously, the golf resort was Spring Lake Golf Resort and was listed in the Guinness Book of World Records for the "world's largest green", measuring 47,000 square feet (4,400 m^{2}). There were three different golf courses: a par 72, 18 hole course, named Panther Creek; a par 71, 18 hole course, named Cougar Trail; and a par 34, nine-hole executive course, named Bobcat Run.

In 2019, the golf resort was acquired and re-named Sebring International Golf Resort.
