= Billy Bowlegs III =

Seminole elder

- Cofahepkee
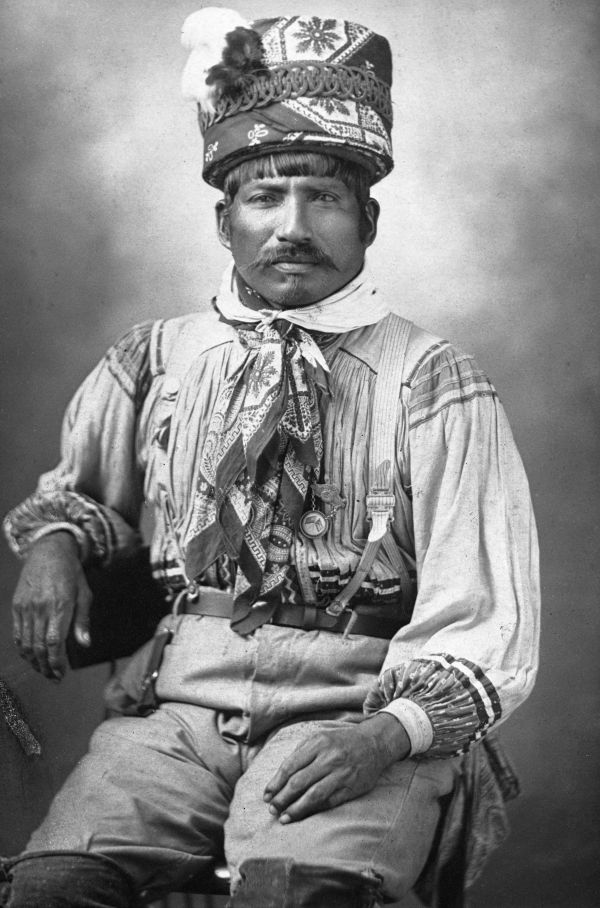
- Photo of Billy Bowlegs III in 1911
- Born: Billie Fewell c. 1862 near Lake Istokpoga, Florida
- Died: 1 December 1965 (aged 102–103); Brighton Reservation, Florida, U.S.
- Resting place: Ortona Cemetery, Ortona, Florida
- Occupation: Historian; Trader
- Height: 6 ft 2 in (188 cm)

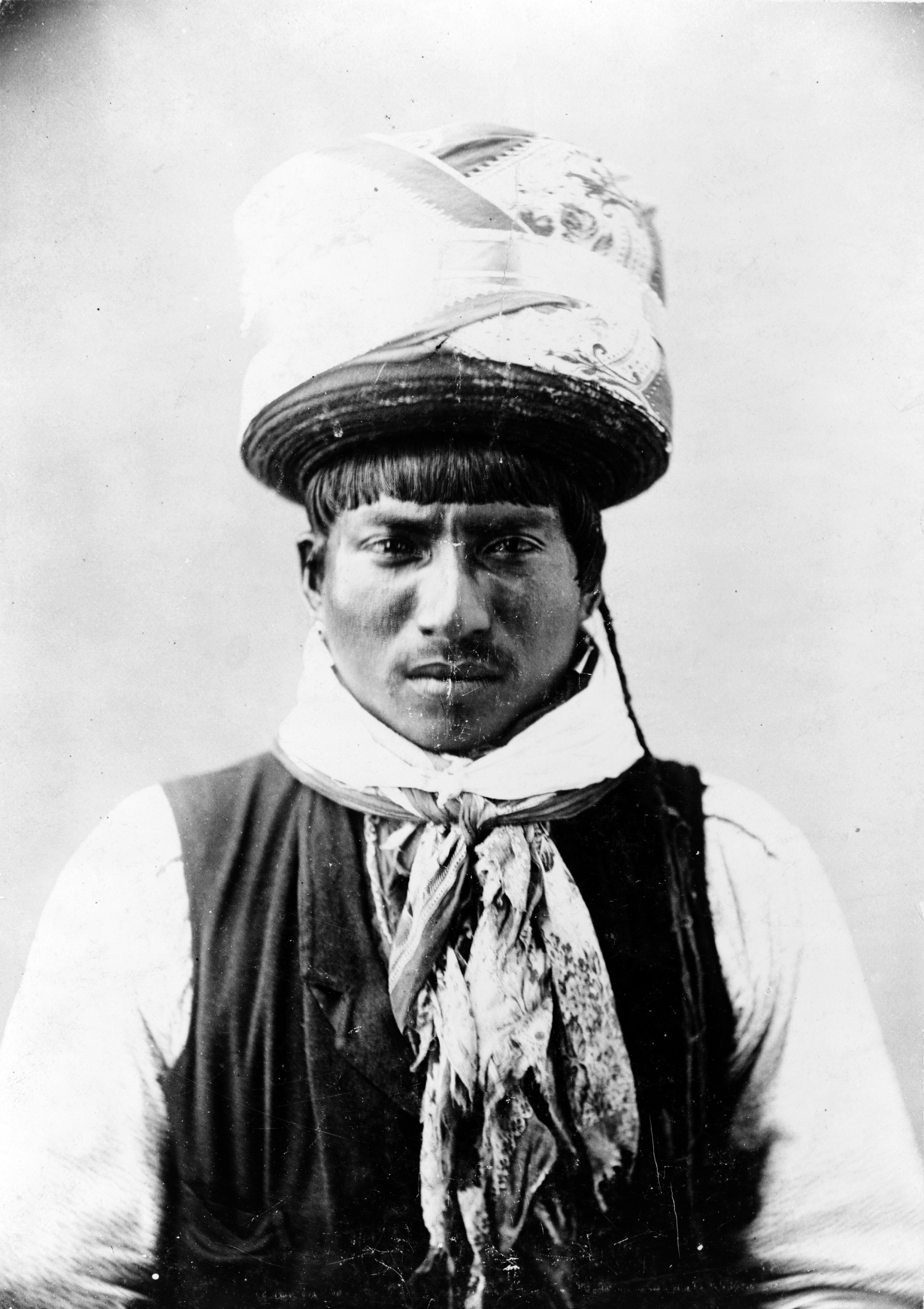
Billy Bowlegs III in 1895

Billy Bowlegs III, Billy Fewell, aka Cofehapkee (c. 1862–1965), was a Seminole historian of mixed Indigenous and African American descent from Florida.

== Early life and education ==
According to an interview with Bowlegs, he was born along the Arbuckle Creek where it meets Lake Istokpoga. He was named Billie Fewell at birth, and was also known by his Seminole name, Cofehapkee. He was the son of an Indigenous Seminole father and a Black Seminole mother. His maternal grandmother, an African-American slave woman named Nagey Nancy, was taken captive by Seminole warriors during the Second Seminole War and adopted into the tribe. He was a member of the Snake Clan. His mother, Old Nancy, was killed in 1889, along with several other members of the Snake Clan, by his uncle, Jim Jumper, in the Jim Jumper massacre.

Bowlegs lived on the Brighton Seminole Indian Reservation after it was established, near Lake Okeechobee in present-day Glades County. As "Billy Bowlegs", he is listed as a Seminole Freedman on the Dawes Rolls.

== Career ==
As an adult, he renamed himself after Billy Bowlegs (Holata Micco), a prominent Seminole chief during the Seminole Wars. A Black Indian, Bowlegs became an elder in the tribe. He learned and taught much about the tribe's history. In the late 1800s, Bowlegs was one of the few Seminoles in Florida who knew how to write and speak English, and he often traded with White Floridians. Bowlegs would marry a Seminole woman named Lucy, the grandniece of Chief Chipco.

Bowlegs befriended James Mallory and Minnie Moore Willson, who moved to Florida in the early 1880s. They became advocates for the Seminole. The couple described him in their book, The Seminole of Florida, 1896. He wanted to improve their understanding of the tribe's culture. The Willsons helped gain approval in 1913 by the Florida state legislature for a 100,000-acre (400 km^{2}) reservation for the Seminole in the Everglades. They testified on the Seminole's behalf to the federal government in hearings in 1917. In the mid-1950s, he performed traditional dances at the Florida Folklife Festival in White Springs, on the Suwannee River.

Bowlegs was buried in Ortona Cemetery in Ortona, Florida.

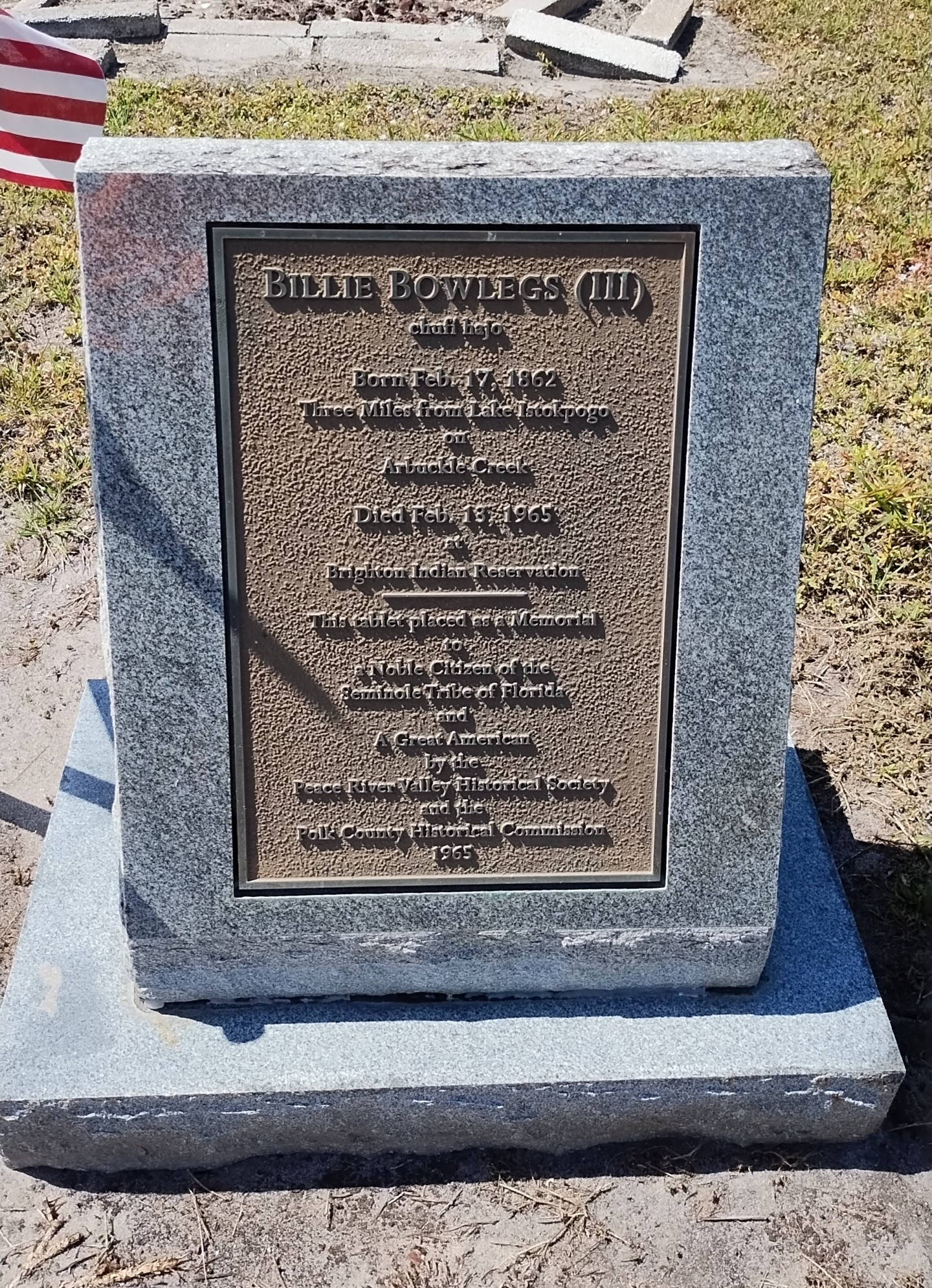
Billie bowlegs III gravestone in ortona cemetery(2024)(pictured by Aubrey Downs)

== Legacy and honors ==
A historical marker honors Billie Bowlegs III, also known as Chufi Hajo, near Moore Haven. It is located at the intersection of U.S. 27 and State Road 78. It was erected by the Polk County Historical Commission and the Seminole Tribe.

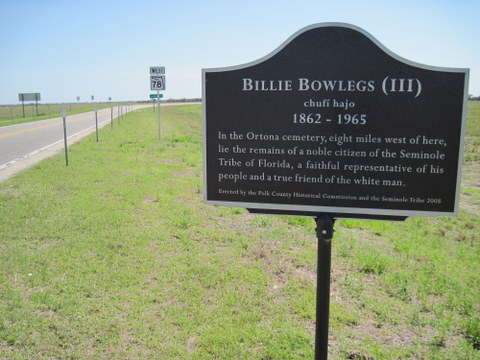
Historical marker

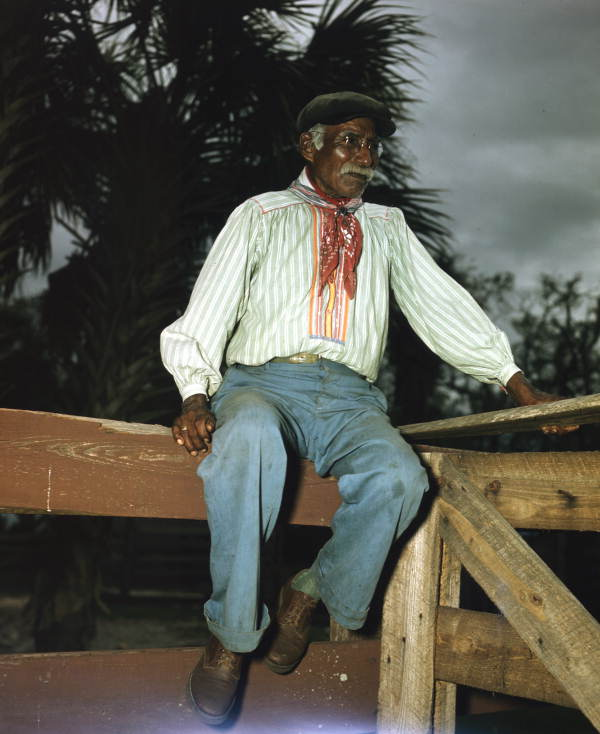
Color photo of Billy, circa 1949, photograph by Joseph Janney Steinmetz

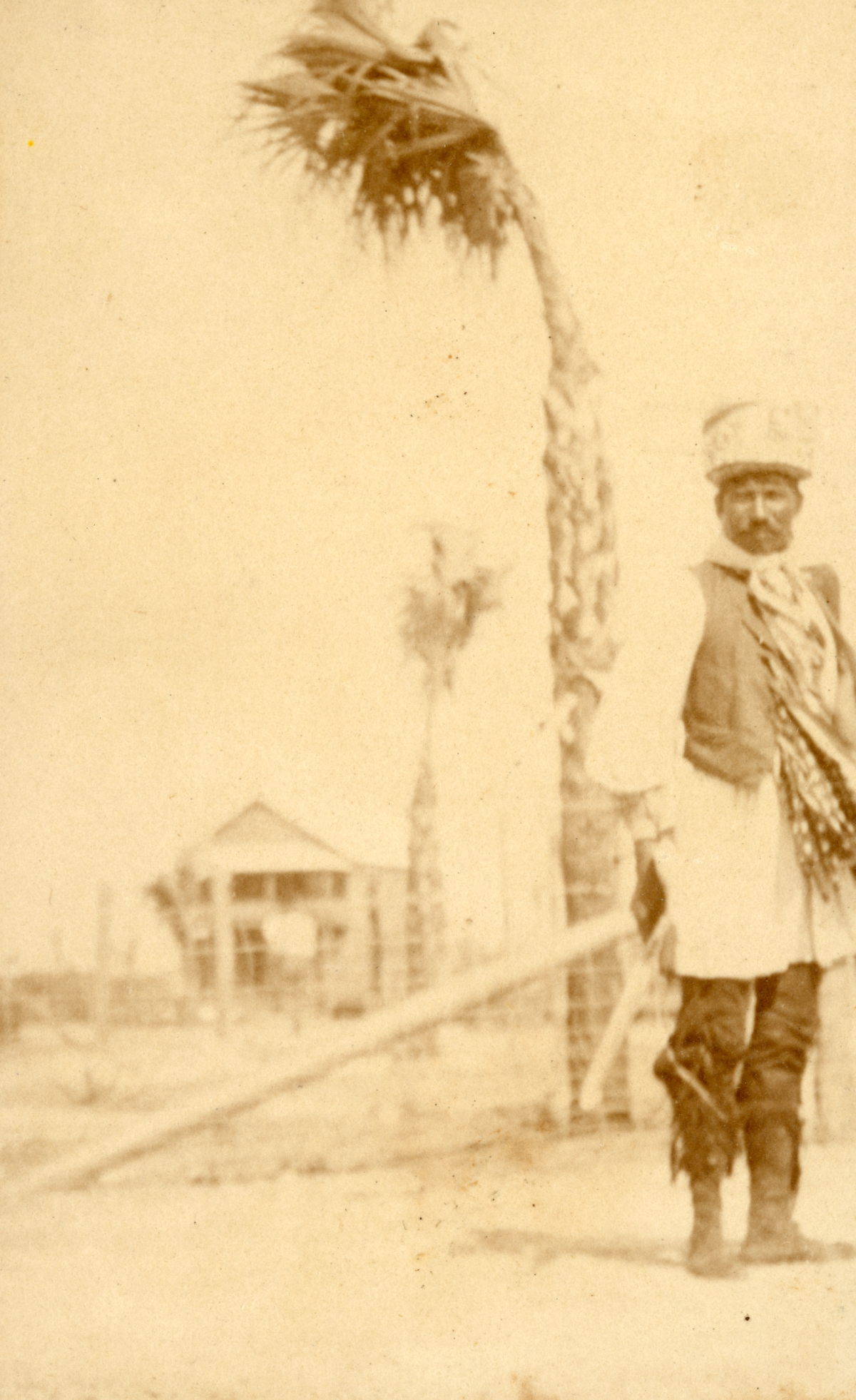
Sepiatone photo of Bowlegs in 1913
