= Aethecerinus hornii =

Scientific classification
- Domain: Eukaryota
- Kingdom: Animalia
- Phylum: Arthropoda
- Class: Insecta
- Order: Coleoptera
- Suborder: Polyphaga
- Infraorder: Cucujiformia
- Family: Cerambycidae
- Genus: Aethecerinus
- Species: A. hornii

Binomial name
- Aethecerinus hornii (Lacordaire, 1869)

Species of beetle

Aethecerinus hornii is a species of beetle in the family Cerambycidae. It was described by Lacordaire in 1869. It is endemic to Florida scrubs in Highlands and Lee counties in Florida.
