= Sun 'n Lake of Sebring, Florida =

Sun 'n Lake of Sebring
- CDP
- Country: United States
- State: Florida
- County: Highlands
- Time zone: UTC-5 (Eastern (EST))
  - Summer (DST): UTC-4 (EDT)
- ZIP code: 33870
- Area code: 863
- Website: https://www.snldistrict.org

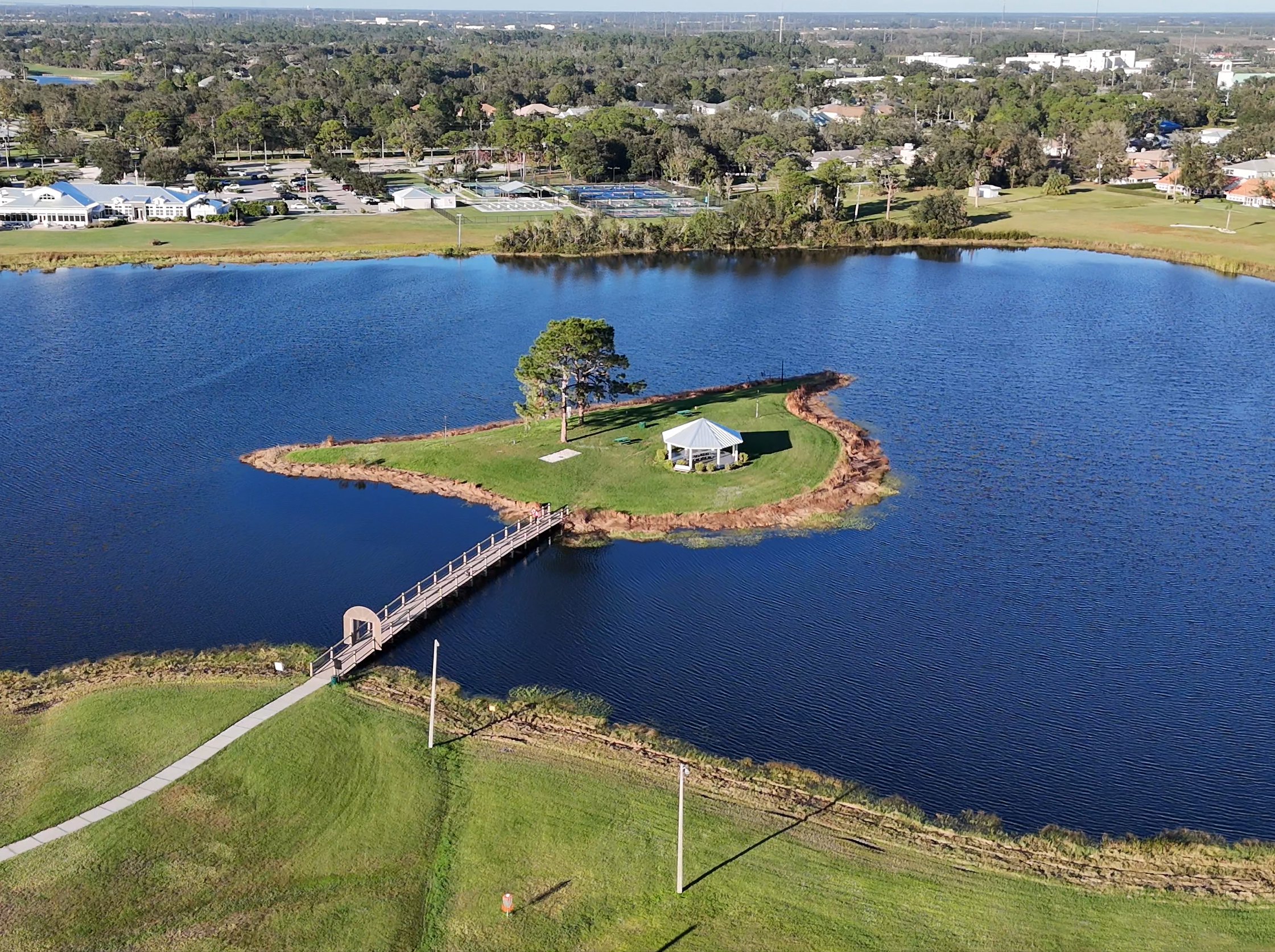
Hog Lake, aka Lake Granada

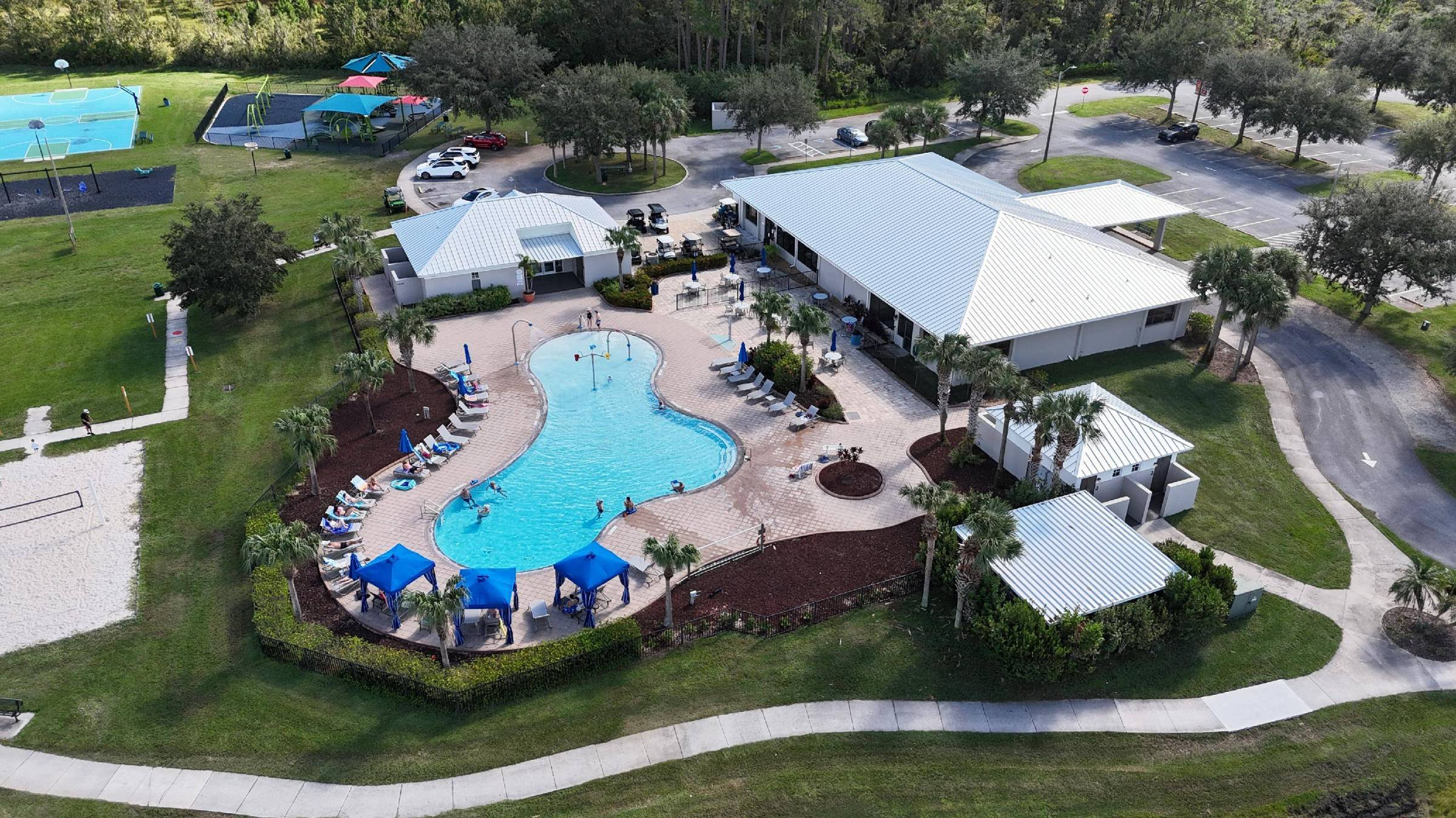
Recreation and Pool Complex at Sun 'n Lake

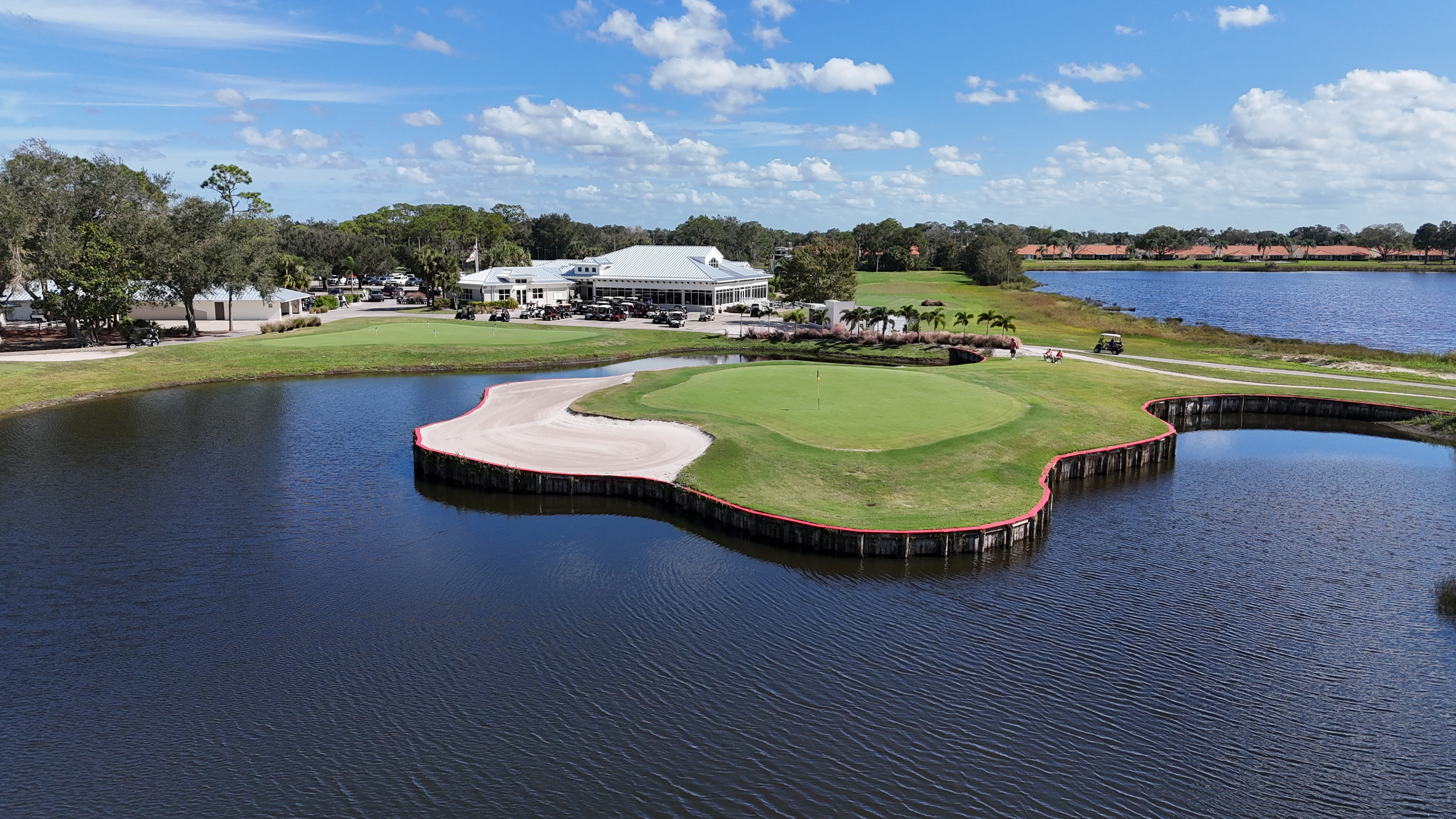
Golf Course at Sun 'n Lake

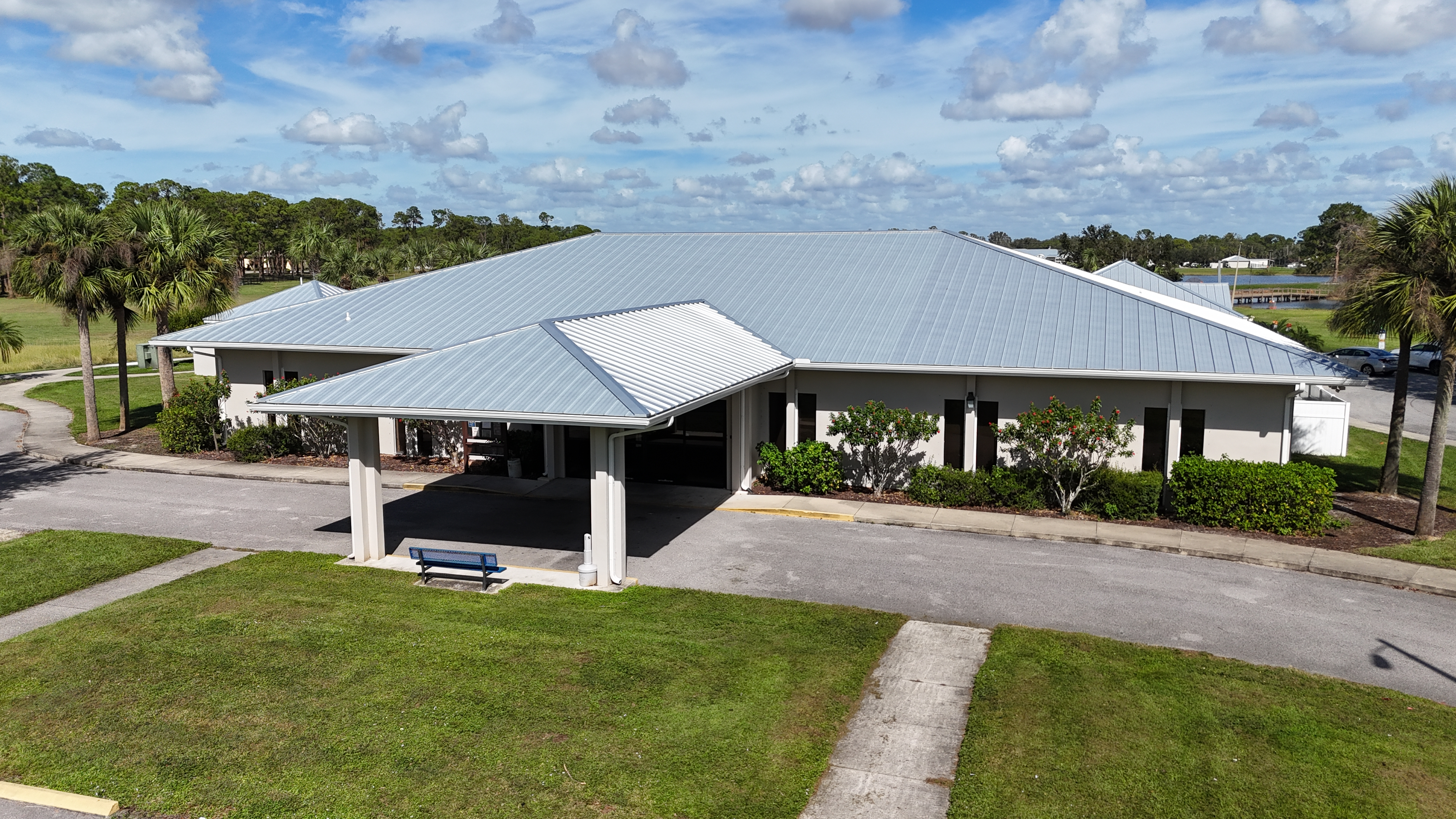
Sun 'n Lake Community Center

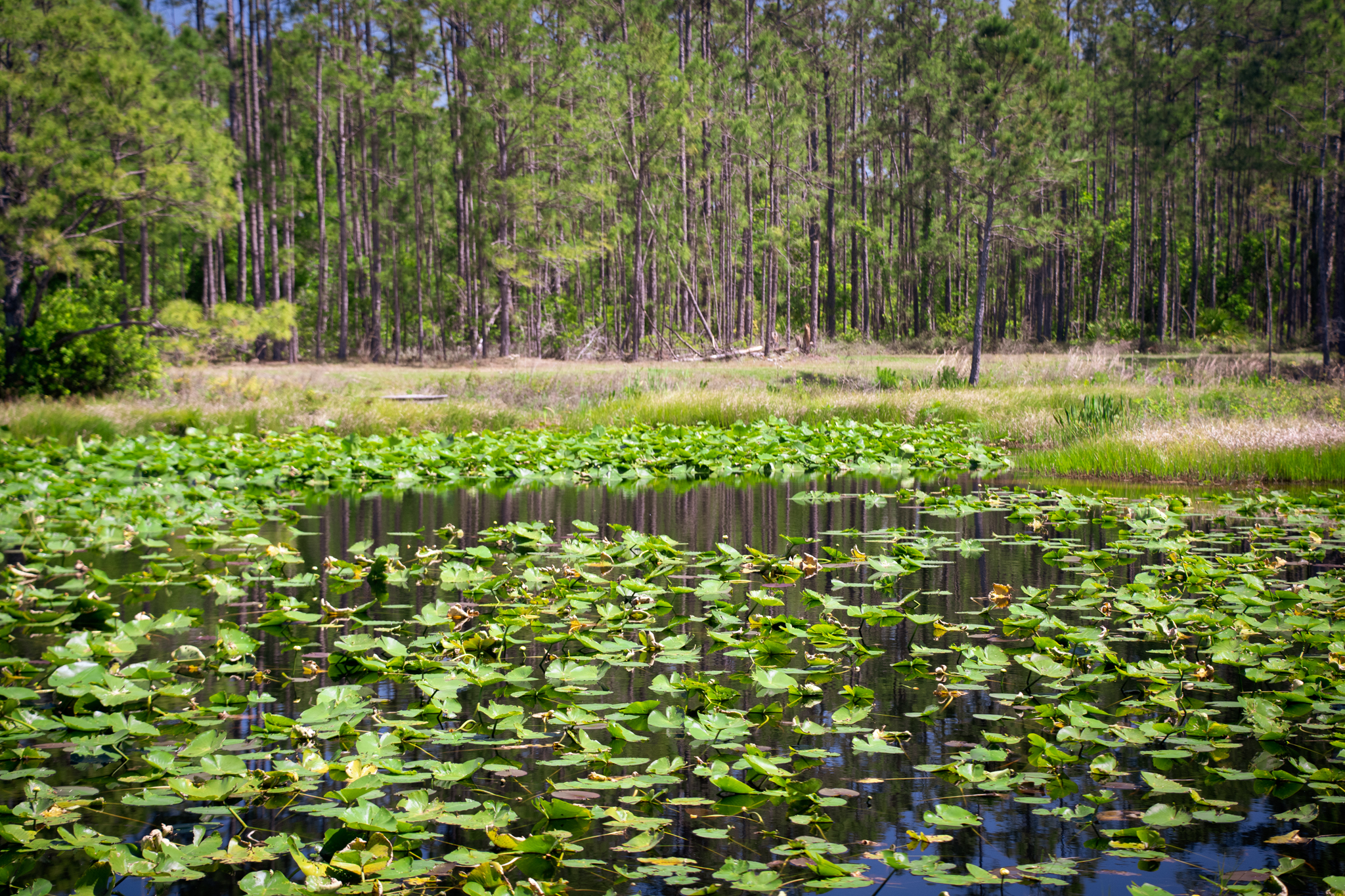
Sun 'n Lake Preserve

The Sun 'n Lake of Sebring improvement district is a special district and unincorporated community in Highlands County, Florida, United States. It was founded in April, 1974. It is located northwest of Sebring, off US 27. It has a similar name to nearby Sun 'n Lakes South, a subdivision south of Lake Placid, also in Highlands County.

The Sun 'n Lake of Sebring community is home to two 18-hole golf courses: Deer Run and Turtle Run.

Sun 'n Lake of Sebring operates under a general manager appointed by an elected five-member board of supervisors. There is also a wilderness preserve area called Sun 'n Lake Preserve to the west.

== Government and Administration ==
Sun 'N Lake of Sebring is governed by the Sun 'N Lake of Sebring Improvement District, a special district established under Florida law. This Improvement District model allows the community to operate independently of the city of Sebring and Highlands County for many local administrative functions.

The District is overseen by a Board of Supervisors, composed of five elected members who serve staggered terms. The Board is responsible for adopting policies, approving the annual budget, and overseeing community-wide planning and development efforts.

Day-to-day operations are managed by the General Manager, who serves as the chief administrative officer. The General Manager supervises department heads across several key areas including Security, Public Works, Administration, Parks and Recreation, and Finance. These departments collectively handle local utilities, infrastructure maintenance, recreation programs, and code enforcement.

Sun 'N Lake also relies on a mix of in-house services and partnerships, including a working relationship with the Highlands County Sheriff's Office for additional law enforcement support. While not an incorporated city, the Improvement District structure enables Sun 'N Lake to provide a high level of local services tailored specifically to the needs of its residents.

In recent years, the community has explored future governance options, including the possibility of becoming an incorporated city. This has led to discussions regarding changes in taxation, staffing requirements, and resident representation.

== Education ==
Sun 'N Lake of Sebring is served by the Highlands County School District, which oversees public education throughout the region. While there are no schools located directly within the boundaries of the Improvement District, several nearby institutions serve Sun 'N Lake residents, including Sun 'N Lake Elementary School, located just outside the community's western edge.

In addition to elementary education, students in the area typically attend Hill-Gustat Middle School and Sebring High School, both part of the public school system and located within a short drive of the community. These schools offer a range of academic and extracurricular programs, including athletics, music, and advanced placement (AP) courses.

For families seeking alternative education options, there are several private schools, charter schools, and homeschool networks operating within Highlands County. Higher education opportunities are also accessible through South Florida State College, which maintains a campus in Avon Park, approximately 20 minutes from Sun 'N Lake.

The community is actively involved in supporting local education through outreach, volunteer opportunities, and collaborative events, such as student art displays and school-sponsored golf tournaments. Sun 'N Lake also promotes life-long learning for adults through recreational classes, workshops, and partnerships with regional organizations.

== Public Safety ==
Public safety within Sun 'N Lake of Sebring is managed through a combination of in-house security personnel and coordination with the Highlands County Sheriff’s Office. The Sun 'N Lake Security Department operates 24/7, providing patrols, gate checks, and general enforcement of community rules and ordinances. Security staff respond to resident concerns, assist with traffic control, and serve as visible deterrents to criminal activity.

Although Sun 'N Lake is not an incorporated municipality, it maintains a strong partnership with county law enforcement to handle incidents requiring police authority or investigation. The District also works closely with Highlands County Emergency Services to coordinate response efforts during hurricanes and other emergencies, with a strong emphasis on disaster preparedness and resident education.

Public safety initiatives also include traffic safety improvements and resident outreach programs to promote safety awareness and build trust between the District and its residents.

== Parks and Recreation ==
Sun 'N Lake of Sebring offers a wide range of parks and recreational amenities designed to enhance the quality of life for residents and visitors. The community is best known for its award-winning championship golf courses—Deer Run and Turtle Run—both of which are managed by the Sun 'N Lake Golf Club. These courses attract golfers from across Florida and host several tournaments and charity events throughout the year.

The recreation complex features a community pool, fitness center, and racquet club with tennis and pickleball courts. These facilities are accessible to residents and guests, with memberships available for regular users. A variety of group classes, wellness programs, and youth activities are scheduled throughout the year.

In addition to structured amenities, Sun 'N Lake includes walking and biking paths, green spaces, playgrounds, and sports fields that promote outdoor activity and community engagement. Seasonal events like holiday festivals, movie nights, and community barbecues are coordinated through the Parks and Recreation Department, contributing to a strong sense of community and civic pride.

Future plans include expanding recreational offerings through new trail development and park improvements to accommodate growing interest in outdoor recreation.

== Golf Courses ==
The Sun 'n Lake of Sebring Improvement District is home to two public 18-hole golf courses: Deer Run and Turtle Run. Both courses are part of the Sun 'n Lake Golf Club and are managed by the Improvement District. The club is a popular destination for residents and visitors and has been recognized for its year-round playability and community integration.

=== Deer Run ===
Deer Run is the older and more traditional of the two courses, known for its long fairways, large greens, and championship-level layout. Opened in 1976, it features a par-72 course measuring approximately 7,000 yards from the championship tees. Deer Run has hosted various regional and state tournaments and is characterized by its tree-lined fairways and strategic bunkering. The course is designed to accommodate players of all skill levels, with multiple tee options available.

=== Turtle Run ===
Turtle Run, opened in 1999, offers a contrasting experience with a shorter and more intricate layout. This par-72 course spans approximately 6,400 yards from the back tees and is known for its rolling terrain, water features, and smaller greens. Turtle Run emphasizes accuracy over distance and appeals to golfers who enjoy a more technical game. The course’s name is derived from the gopher tortoise habitats that are protected throughout the area.

Facilities and Services: The golf club also includes a pro shop, driving range, practice greens, and the Island View Restaurant, which provides dining options for golfers and the general public. Lessons, leagues, and tournaments are offered throughout the year, and the courses are open to the public with memberships available for residents and non-residents alike.

== Ecosystem ==
Sun 'n Lake Preserve is a 1,350-acre nature preserve located in Sebring, Florida, adjacent to the Sun 'n Lake Improvement District. The main entrance and parking area are situated at the corner of Sun 'n Lake Boulevard and Balboa Boulevard.

The preserve is dedicated to the conservation of native wildlife and their habitats, and it provides opportunities for passive recreation. Visitors can access approximately 15 miles of trails, which include both shaded paths and open areas. In addition to hiking, the preserve features off-road biking loops that pass through cypress swamps and South Florida flatwoods.

Sun 'n Lake Preserve includes three catch-and-release fishing ponds and serves as a corridor for various species, including black bears, Florida panthers, deer, alligators, gopher tortoises, and a wide variety of birds.

The preserve is managed in coordination with the Florida Fish and Wildlife Conservation Commission. To protect the natural environment, activities such as driving, boating, hunting, and camping are prohibited within the preserve.

== Infrastructure ==
Sun 'N Lake of Sebring manages its own infrastructure systems through the District’s Public Works Department, which oversees the maintenance and development of roadways, drainage systems, public spaces, and utilities. The District provides water, sewer, and non-potable irrigation services, ensuring that the growing needs of the community are met reliably and efficiently.

Infrastructure projects are funded through the District’s budget and capital improvement plan, which prioritizes upgrades based on assessments of aging systems, future development, and resident feedback. Recent improvements have included road resurfacing, stormwater drainage enhancements, and the modernization of utility infrastructure to support increased demand.

The District is also investing in long-term sustainability, with projects designed to improve environmental efficiency and resource conservation. Planned upgrades include smart irrigation systems, energy-efficient facility retrofits, and the introduction of digital signage for improved communication with residents.

These ongoing efforts reflect Sun 'N Lake’s commitment to maintaining a high-quality infrastructure that supports both current and future residents while preserving the community’s natural beauty and functionality.

== Wastewater Treatment Plant ==
In response to population growth and increased infrastructure demands, Sun 'N Lake of Sebring has initiated plans to construct a new state-of-the-art wastewater treatment plant. The facility is being designed to expand the community’s wastewater capacity, improve environmental sustainability, and support future development within the District.

The project is part of Sun 'N Lake’s long-term capital improvement strategy and represents one of the most significant infrastructure investments in the District's history. The new plant will replace the aging system currently in use and will be built to meet modern regulatory standards set by the Florida Department of Environmental Protection (FDEP).

Key features of the new facility include:

- Increased treatment capacity to support residential and commercial growth
- Advanced filtration and nutrient removal technologies to improve water quality
- Energy-efficient systems aimed at reducing operational costs
- Enhanced odor control and reduced environmental footprint

The plant is also expected to incorporate reclaimed water capabilities, allowing for treated wastewater to be reused for irrigation and other non-potable purposes—helping conserve potable water and aligning with sustainability goals.

Construction is scheduled to begin in late 2025 or early 2026, with an expected duration of 5 to 7 years. Funding for the project includes a combination of state grants and a Special Infrastructure Charge assessed to all properties within the District. This charge amounts to $2,700 per property, payable over 15 years at $180 annually.

== Notable residents ==
Willie Hernández
