= Fort Kissimmee, Florida =

Coordinates: 27°35′32″N 81°09′24″W

Fort Kissimmee was a fort in Highlands County, Florida. The fort was situated 20 miles (32 km) east of Avon Park and adjacent to the Kissimmee River.
