= Samaritan's Touch Care Center =

Geography
- Location: Sebring center at 3015 Herring Avenue, Sebring, Florida 33870; Lake Placid center at 300 W. Interlake Blvd., Lake Placid, Florida 33852, southeast United States, Florida, United States
- Coordinates: Sebring center 27.5423°N 81.4955°W ; Lake Placid center 27.2983°N 81.3697°W

Organization
- Type: nonprofit medical clinic

History
- Founded: May 2007

Links
- Website: http://samaritanstouch.org/

Samaritan's Touch Care Center is a nonprofit outpatient medical clinic with two Highlands County, Florida, locations - one in Sebring and one in Lake Placid. It considers itself a Christian ministry and says many persons who have been helped by it "have dedicated their lives to Christ and began a personal relationship with Jesus Christ." It provides free health services to persons who meet these criteria:

- Have no medical insurance of any kind (not even Medicaid or Medicare).
- Have a family income at or below 200% of the federal poverty level.

== History ==
Samaritan's Touch apparently had its beginnings in 2006 and, according to the NonProfiFacts.com website, became a charitable organization in March 2007. The Sebring clinic opened in May 2007 and has always been at the Herring Avenue location, just across the street from the Sebring Comcast customer service center. Samaritan's Touch was organized to provide healthcare services to those who cannot afford any type of health care. Highlands County has a large number of persons who do not have work or do work, but make little more than the Federal minimum wage.

The clinic has always run with mostly volunteer help. Dr. Luis M. Pena from the beginning has volunteered service as the clinic's primary care physician. According to the Manta website, as of 2012, the clinic has grown to have nine employees.

In early 2010 Samaritan's Touch planned to open a clinic in Lake Placid. Diana Furr, then executive director of the clinic, said 15% of the patients seen at the Sebring clinic were from the Lake Placid area. From 2007 to 2010 the Sebring clinic logged more than 15,000 patient visits. Samaritan's Touch opened its Lake Placid clinic July 11, 2011. Dr. Donald Dawkins, a Florida Hospital Lake Placid emergency room physician, became the volunteer medical director of the Lake Placid clinic.

In July 2010 Florida Hospital Heartland Division for a time loaned an administrator to Samarian's Touch to help expand the clinic's reputation, reach and resources. In 2011 Florida Hospital Heartland Medical Center donated more than $1.5 million in diagnostic imaging, laboratory services and outpatient services to Samaritan's Touch patients. The Moffitt Cancer Center offered cancer care in Tampa, Florida.

Several websites provide detailed financial data on Samaritan's Touch. All of these use the latest data available, the 2010 year. The gist of the data is that this organization had assets of $272,148 and revenues of $510,082. Similarly, a news story in the local newspaper, Highlands Today, in July 2012 said 2,250 patients are served by the Sebring and Lake Placid clinics.

== Ratings ==
The Healthgrades website provides very little information on Samaritan's Touch. It provides only one patient survey and that was on Dr. Pena. Similarly, the Vitals website provided little information on the organization. It, too, had only one patient survey and it, too, was for Dr. Pena. Since Samaritan's Touch is considered a local, rather than a regional or national ministry, it is not listed in the Ministry Watch website.
