= Aethecerinus wilsonii =

Scientific classification
- Domain: Eukaryota
- Kingdom: Animalia
- Phylum: Arthropoda
- Class: Insecta
- Order: Coleoptera
- Suborder: Polyphaga
- Infraorder: Cucujiformia
- Family: Cerambycidae
- Genus: Aethecerinus
- Species: A. wilsonii

Binomial name
- Aethecerinus wilsonii (Horn, 1860)

Species of beetle

Aethecerinus wilsonii is a species of beetle in the family Cerambycidae. It was described by George Henry Horn in 1860.
