= Aethecerinus =

Scientific classification
- Kingdom: Animalia
- Phylum: Arthropoda
- Class: Insecta
- Order: Coleoptera
- Suborder: Polyphaga
- Infraorder: Cucujiformia
- Family: Cerambycidae
- Subfamily: Cerambycinae
- Tribe: Trachyderini
- Genus: Aethecerinus; Fall & Cockerell, 1907

Synonyms
- Aethecerus Chevrolat, 1862 (Preocc.)

Genus of beetles

Aethecerinus is a genus of beetles belonging to the family Cerambycidae, containing the following species:

- Aethecerinus hornii (Lacordaire, 1869)
- Aethecerinus latecinctus (Horn, 1880)
- Aethecerinus wilsonii (Horn, 1860)
