= Jim Jumper massacre =

Mass murder in Seminole camp, Florida, US

Coordinates: 27.2458°N 80.6156°W

- Location: Bluefields (St. Lucie County), Florida, United States
- Date: February 14 or 15, 1889
- Attack type: Mass murder
- Weapon: Rifle
- Deaths: At least 7 (including perpetrator)
- Injuries: 1
- Perpetrator: Jim Jumper

The Jim Jumper massacre, or Bluefields massacre, was an incident in early 1889 at a Seminole Indian camp northeast of Lake Okeechobee, in St. Lucie County, Florida, United States. Jim Jumper, a biracial Seminole, killed several Seminoles, and was then killed by another Seminole.

== Background ==
Jumper was the son of an African woman named Nagey Nancy, who had been one of only three African slaves retained by the remnant of the Seminoles left in Florida after the Third Seminole War. The three women had been purchased by Seminoles when they were children. Inheritance in the Seminoles was matrilineal, with a woman's children belonging to her clan. Normally, children with a Seminole father and a black mother would not have belonged to any clan, a distinct disadvantage in Seminole society. The last three African women among the Seminoles were adopted into the clan system. Nagey Nancy was owned by the Snake clan, and her two children by Seminole fathers, Jim Jumper and Nancy, were designated as belonging to the Little Black Snake Clan.

The Snake clan, along with other Seminole clans, had lived on Fisheating Creek west of Lake Okeechobee for many years after the Third Seminole War, but in the 1880s a white cattleman bought their herds on the condition that the Seminoles move away. The Snake clan then moved to an area northeast of Lake Okeechobee later called Bluefields. (Note: The Bluefield Ranch Natural Area is northeast of Lake Okeechobee in St. Lucie County.)

One report says that Jumper was living by himself, and had a reputation for bad deeds. A cattleman from Fort Pierce had taken a herd over to Punta Rassa for shipment to Cuba, and was returning home with the money from the sale in gold coins. He spotted Jim following him and suspected Jumper meant to rob him, but, by running his horse at a full gallop, was able to reach his ranch house at Ten Mile near Fort Pierce before Jumper could catch up to him.

Jumper wanted to marry the daughter of Big Tommie, but was told to find a black wife. Jumper insisted that he had been raised to be a Seminole, and wanted to marry a Seminole wife, but was refused again, and reportedly got drunk. Big Tommie's mother, who had recently died, had reportedly said before she died that she wanted her slave Jumper killed and buried with her to be her servant in the afterlife. As Seminoles sometimes killed horses to accompany their owners in the afterlife, Jumper may have worried that he would be killed to join her in death. Jumper was also seen just before the attack to have a bad wound on his leg that may have become infected and made him delirious.

== The attack ==
Descriptions of the attack include ones from Betty Mae Tiger Jumper's grandmother Mary Tiger, from Will Addison, the son of a white settler, who witnessed the attack from a trader's camp next to the Snake Clan camp, from Billy Bowlegs III, Jumper's nephew, from an unnamed source that appeared in The New York Times, and in a book on the history of the cattle industry by Joe Ackerman. Betty Jumper says the attack occurred on February 15, 1889. One article based on an account from Billy Bowlegs places the attack on February 14, 1889, another places the attack in March, 1889. The New York Times article was filed from Jacksonville on March 2, 1889.

Details of the attack vary, but Jumper entered the Snake Clan camp and shot and killed several people. Names listed in various accounts include his sister Nancy (Billy Bowlegs' mother), Big Tommie, Big Tommie's daughter and wife, Woxo Micco (also known as Cypress Tom Tiger and Old Tiger), Young Tiger, his wife, Martha Tiger, Jimmy Tiger, a pregnant woman named Lucy, and Lake Willson, as well as unnamed men, women, and children, including two of Nancy's children (no account lists more than six victims by name). A half-brother of Billy Bowlegs was knocked unconscious and feared dead, but recovered. According to Addison, Jumper shot his sister when she attempted to stop him after killing Big Tommie's pregnant wife.

A boy who was shot at by Jumper escaped and alerted a Seminole named Billy Martin who was working in a nearby cane field. Martin took his rifle, a .38 caliber Winchester 1873, and returned to the camp, where he saw Jumper sitting, and shot him. The Seminoles did not want to contaminate their goods with contact with Jumper's body, so they borrowed a wagon and team of oxen from Will Addison's father John, dragged Jumper's body to a cypress pond, and left it to be eaten by alligators. The Snake Clan moved to a temporary camp a short distance away. Jumper's victims were buried nearby, and a medicine man came to ritually clean the camp site. The Snake Clan then moved away from the area, which was abandoned by the Seminoles and seized by ranchers as grazing grounds.
