= Arbuckle Creek =

River in Florida, United States

Coordinates: 27°26′05″N 81°17′07″W

Arbuckle Creek is located in Central Florida. It flows from Lake Arbuckle and eventually feeds into Lake Istokpoga after passing by the Arbuckle Wildlife Management Area and Avon Park Air Force Range (a bombing range outside Avon Park, Florida). The creek offers scenic paddling through natural habitats. A public boat ramp provides access for small boats and paddle craft. The creel covers about 25 miles.

According to an interview, the Seminole Chief Billy Bowlegs III was born on the Arbuckle Creek.
