= Sylvan Shores, Florida =

- Unincorporated community
- Location in Highlands County and the state of Florida
- Coordinates: 27°19′04″N 81°20′44″W
- Country: United States
- State: Florida
- County: Highlands

Government
  - Type: Unincorporated

Area
  - Total: 2.82 sq mi (7.3 km^{2})
  - Land: 2.23 sq mi (5.8 km^{2})
  - Water: 0.58 sq mi (1.5 km^{2}) 20.57%
- Elevation: 82 ft (25 m)

Population (2000)
  - Total: 2,424
  - Density: 1,086.4/sq mi (419.5/km^{2})
- Time zone: UTC-5 (Eastern (EST))
  - Summer (DST): UTC-4 (EDT)
- Area code: 863
- FIPS code: 12-70475
- GNIS feature ID: 2402910

Sylvan Shores is an unincorporated community and former census-designated place (CDP) in Highlands County, Florida, United States, located immediately northeast of the town of Lake Placid. As of the 2000 census, the CDP population was 2,424.

== Geography ==
According to the United States Census Bureau, the CDP has a total area of 2.82 square miles (7.3 km^{2}), of which 2.23 square miles (5.8 km^{2}) is land and 0.58 square miles (1.5 km^{2}) (20.57%) is water.

== Demographics ==
As of the census of 2000, there were 2,424 people, 1,166 households, and 795 families residing in the CDP. The population density was 419.7 people/km^{2} (1,087 people/mi^{2}). There were 1,487 housing units at an average density of 257.5 units/km^{2} (667 units/mi^{2}). The racial makeup of the CDP was 96.08% White, 1.57% African American, 0.08% Native American, 0.25% Asian, 1.65% from other races, and 0.37% from two or more races. Hispanic or Latino of any race were 5.61% of the population.

There were 1,166 households, out of which 13.9% had children under the age of 18 living with them, 60.5% were married couples living together, 5.9% had a female householder with no husband present, and 31.8% were non-families. 27.8% of all households were made up of individuals, and 22.0% had someone living alone who was 65 years of age or older. The average household size was 2.08 and the average family size was 2.49.

In the CDP, the population was spread out, with 14.1% under the age of 18, 3.1% from 18 to 24, 13.9% from 25 to 44, 23.1% from 45 to 64, and 45.9% who were 65 years of age or older. The median age was 63 years. For every 100 females, there were 87.6 males. For every 100 females age 18 and over, there were 82.8 males.

The median income for a household in the CDP was $30,256, and the median income for a family was $33,696. Males had a median income of $30,948 versus $23,125 for females. The per capita income for the CDP was $17,950. About 8.0% of families and 11.2% of the population were below the poverty line, including 20.7% of those under age 18 and 8.1% of those age 65 or over.
