= Lake Denton =

Lake in the state of Florida, United States

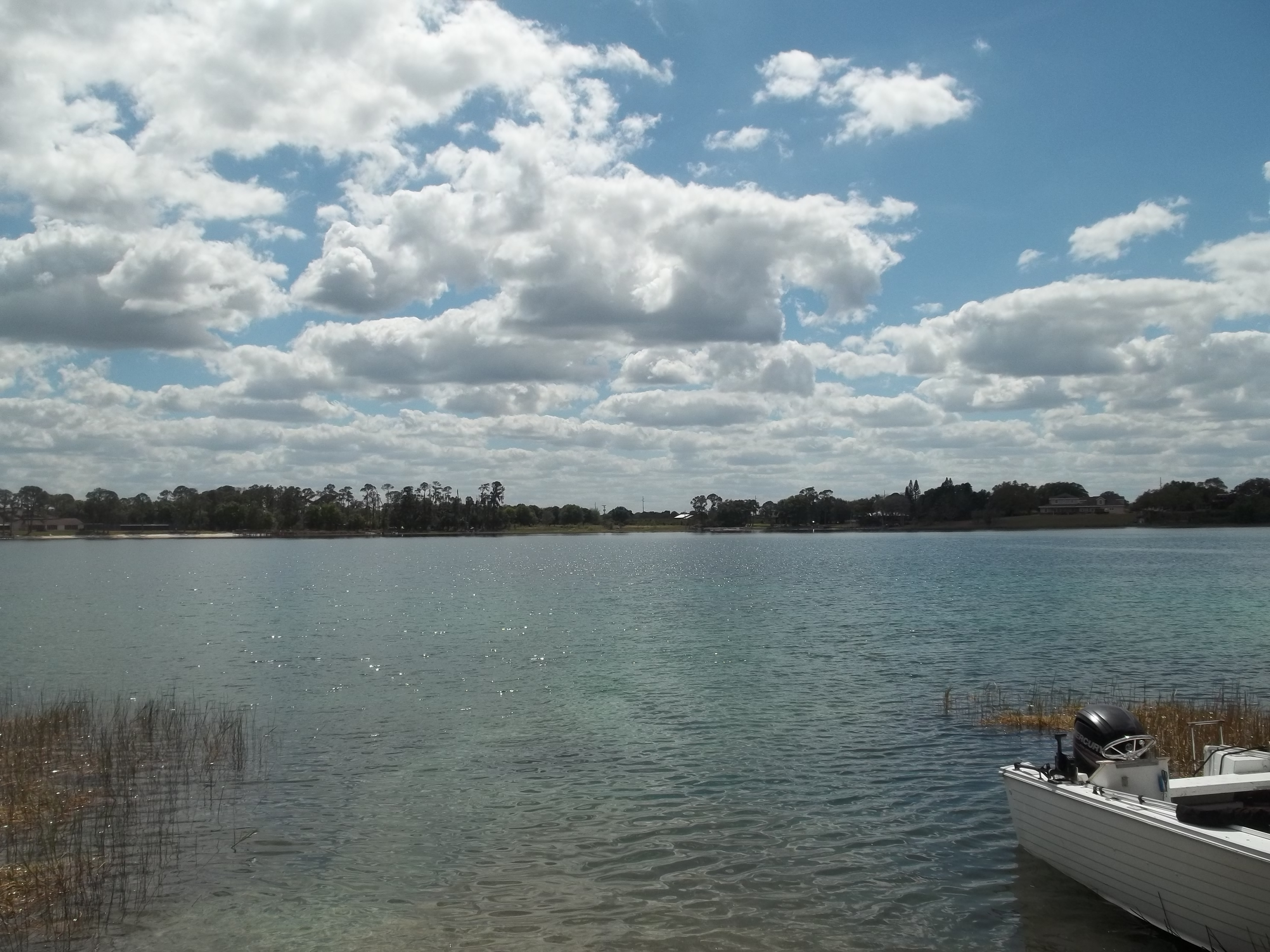

- Location within Florida Location within the United States
- Location: Highlands County, Florida
- Coordinates: 27°33′22″N 81°29′22″W
- Basin countries: United States
- Surface area: 66 acres (27 ha)
- Max. depth: 51 ft (16 m)

Lake Denton is a 66-acre (270,000 m^{2}) lake in Highlands County in the U.S. state of Florida. It is between the cities of Avon Park and Sebring. Its maximum depth is 51 feet (16 m). Divers use the lake for recreation and training. Lake Denton Camp, run by Lake Denton Management Inc. is located on its shore. The property Lake Denton Camp is located on is owned by The Orange Blossom Baptist Association.

Lake Denton has a public boat ramp, but no public swimming areas. In recent years, a conflict has arisen between those wanting to use the lake for boating and those wanting to use it for swimming. In summer 2005, the boat ramp was officially closed, temporarily, so people could use Lake Denton for swimming. The future will determine whether boating and swimming will both be allowed, depending on how the Highlands County Commission decides to respond to conflicts between area residents and lake visitors. It is now open for boaters, although the conflict over its recreational use has not been resolved.
