= Highlands County, Florida =

County in Florida, United States

- County
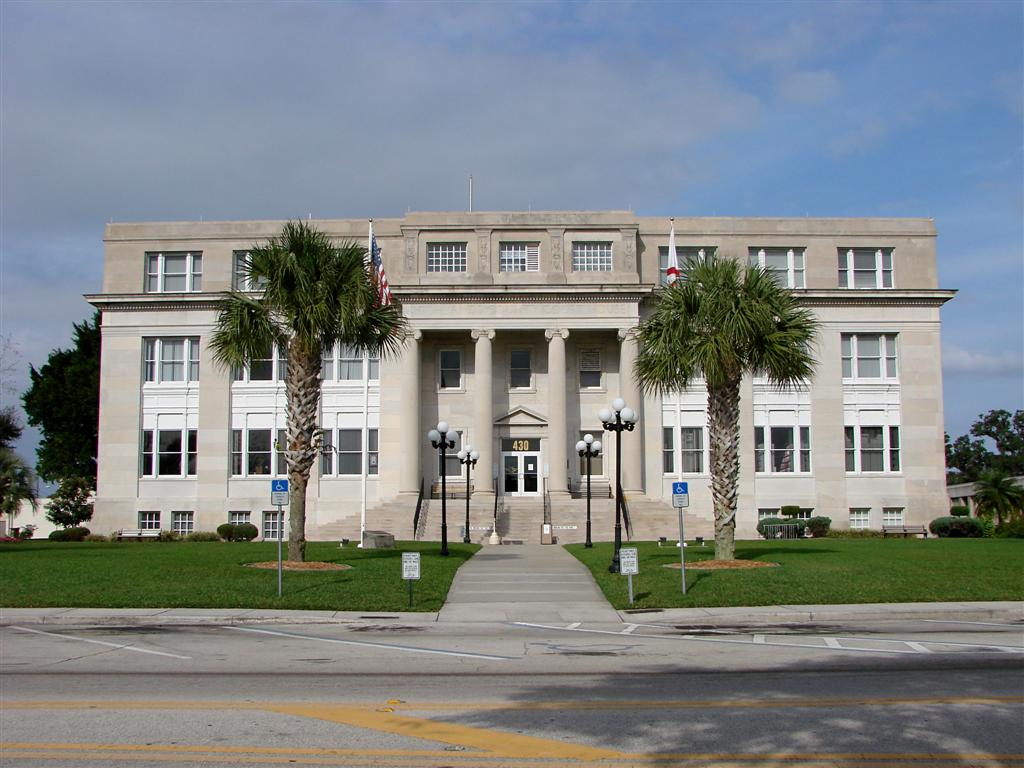
- Highlands County Courthouse

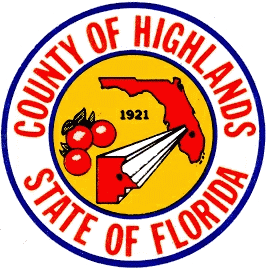
- Seal

- Location within the U.S. state of Florida
- Coordinates: 27°20′N 81°20′W
- Country: United States
- State: Florida
- Founded: April 23, 1921
- Named for: county's terrain
- Seat: Sebring
- Largest city: Sebring

Area
  - Total: 1,106 sq mi (2,860 km^{2})
  - Land: 1,017 sq mi (2,630 km^{2})
  - Water: 89 sq mi (230 km^{2}) 8.1%

Population (2020)
  - Total: 101,235
  - Estimate (2025): 111,122 ▲
  - Density: 99.54/sq mi (38.43/km^{2})
- Time zone: UTC−5 (Eastern)
  - Summer (DST): UTC−4 (EDT)
- Congressional district: 18th
- Website: www.highlandsfl.gov

Highlands County is a county located in the Florida Heartland region of the U.S. state of Florida. As of the 2020 census, the population was 101,235. Its county seat is Sebring. Highlands County comprises the Sebring, FL Metropolitan Statistical Area. The SMA was first defined in 2003 as the Sebring, Florida Micropolitan Statistical Area (μSA), consisting of Highlands County. The status of the area was changed to a metropolitan statistical area (MSA) in 2013. The MSA was renamed the Sebring-Avon Park, Florida MSA in 2018. The name reverted to Sebring, Florida MSA in 2023.

== History ==
Highlands County was created in 1921 along with Charlotte, Glades, and Hardee, when they were separated from DeSoto County. It was named for the terrain of the county. It boasted the fifth-oldest population in America in 2012.

== Geography ==
According to the U.S. Census Bureau, the county has a total area of 1,106 square miles (2,860 km^{2}), of which 1,017 square miles (2,630 km^{2}) is land and 89 square miles (230 km^{2}) (8.1%) is water. In area, it is the 14th largest county in Florida. Highlands County is bounded on the east by the Kissimmee River. Lake Istokpoga, the largest lake in the county, is connected to the Kissimmee River by two canals; the Istokpoga canal, and the C41 (outflow) canal.

=== Adjacent counties ===
- Osceola County, Florida - northeast
- Okeechobee County, Florida - east
- Glades County, Florida - south
- Charlotte County, Florida - southwest
- DeSoto County, Florida - west
- Hardee County, Florida - west
- Polk County, Florida - north

=== National protected area ===
- Lake Wales Ridge National Wildlife Refuge (part)

== Demographics ==
Historical population
Census	Pop.	Note	%±
1930	9,192		—
1940	9,246		0.6%
1950	13,636		47.5%
1960	21,338		56.5%
1970	29,507		38.3%
1980	47,526		61.1%
1990	68,432		44.0%
2000	87,366		27.7%
2010	98,786		13.1%
2020	101,235		2.5%
2025 (est.)	111,122	▲	9.8%
U.S. Decennial Census; 1790-1960 1900-1990; 1990-2000 2010-2019

=== Racial and ethnic composition ===
Highlands County, Florida – Racial and ethnic composition Note: the US Census treats Hispanic/Latino as an ethnic category. This table excludes Latinos from the racial categories and assigns them to a separate category. Hispanics/Latinos may be of any race.
Race / Ethnicity (NH = Non-Hispanic)	Pop 1980	Pop 1990	Pop 2000	Pop 2010	Pop 2020	% 1980	% 1990	% 2000	% 2010	% 2020
White alone (NH)	38,899	57,592	66,814	69,804	65,511	81.85%	84.16%	76.48%	70.66%	64.71%
Black or African American alone (NH)	6,498	6,721	7,925	8,750	9,484	13.67%	9.82%	9.07%	8.86%	9.37%
Native American or Alaska Native alone (NH)	201	214	308	375	291	0.42%	0.31%	0.35%	0.38%	0.29%
Asian alone (NH)	121	371	881	1,402	1,602	0.25%	0.54%	1.01%	1.42%	1.58%
Native Hawaiian or Pacific Islander alone (NH)	x	x	20	37	49	x	x	0.02%	0.04%	0.05%
Other race alone (NH)	41	34	104	100	307	0.09%	0.05%	0.12%	0.10%	0.30%
Mixed race or Multiracial (NH)	x	x	772	1,161	3,048	x	x	0.88%	1.18%	3.01%
Hispanic or Latino (any race)	1,766	3,500	10,542	17,157	20,943	3.72%	5.11%	12.07%	17.37%	20.69%
Total	47,526	68,432	87,366	98,786	101,235	100.00%	100.00%	100.00%	100.00%	100.00%

A map of racial demographics in Highlands County, Florida by Census tract Legend: Non-Hispanic White 50–60% 60–70% 70–80% 80–90% Hispanic 40–50% 50–60% Black or African American 50–60% Equal

=== 2020 census ===
As of the 2020 census, the county had a population of 101,235, 44,376 households, and 27,169 families residing in the county.

The median age was 54.7 years. 17.5% of residents were under the age of 18 and 35.1% were 65 years of age or older. For every 100 females there were 93.4 males, and for every 100 females age 18 and over there were 91.3 males.

The racial makeup of the county was 70.7% White, 9.8% Black or African American, 0.5% American Indian and Alaska Native, 1.6% Asian, 0.1% Native Hawaiian and Pacific Islander, 6.6% from some other race, and 10.8% from two or more races. Hispanic or Latino residents of any race comprised 20.7% of the population.

80.1% of residents lived in urban areas, while 19.9% lived in rural areas.

Of the 44,376 households, 20.7% had children under the age of 18 living in them. Of all households, 47.5% were married-couple households, 18.0% were households with a male householder and no spouse or partner present, and 27.8% were households with a female householder and no spouse or partner present. About 30.4% of all households were made up of individuals and 19.5% had someone living alone who was 65 years of age or older.

There were 57,486 housing units, of which 22.8% were vacant. Among occupied housing units, 75.9% were owner-occupied and 24.1% were renter-occupied. The homeowner vacancy rate was 3.1% and the rental vacancy rate was 12.0%.

=== 2000 census ===
As of the 2000 census, there were 87,366 people, 37,471 households, and 25,780 families living in the county. The population density was 85.00 people per square mile (32.82 people/km^{2}). There were 48,846 housing units at an average density of 47.5 per square mile (18.3/km^{2}). The racial makeup of the county was 83.47% White, 9.33% Black or African American, 0.44% Native American, 1.05% Asian, 0.03% Pacific Islander, 4.14% from other races, and 1.53% from two or more races. 12.07% of the population were Hispanic or Latino of any race.

In 2000 there were 37,471 households, out of which 20.00% had children under the age of 18 living with them, 57.20% were married couples living together, 8.50% had a female householder with no husband present, and 31.20% were non-families. 26.30% of all households were made up of individuals, and 16.70% had someone living alone who was 65 years of age or older. The average household size was 2.30 and the average family size was 2.70.

In the county, the population was spread out, with 19.20% under the age of 18, 6.30% from 18 to 24, 19.30% from 25 to 44, 22.20% from 45 to 64, and 33.00% who were 65 years of age or older. The median age was 50 years. For every 100 females, there were 95.20 males. For every 100 females age 18 and over, there were 92.20 males.

The median income for a household in the county was $30,160, and the median income for a family was $35,647. Males had a median income of $26,811 versus $20,725 for females. The per capita income for the county was $17,222. About 10.20% of families and 15.20% of the population were below the poverty line, including 25.60% of those under age 18 and 7.40% of those age 65 or over.

== Transportation ==
=== Highways ===
- U.S. Route 27
- State Road 17
- U.S. Route 98
- State Road 64
- State Road 66
- State Road 70
- Sebring Parkway/Panther Parkway

=== Airports ===
- Sebring Regional Airport (KSEF)
- Avon Park Executive Airport (KAVO)

=== Rail ===
- CSX Transportation (CSXT)
- Amtrak (AMTK)

== Government ==
Highlands County is governed by five elected County Commissioners and an appointed County Administrator. The administrator has executive powers to implement all decisions, ordinances, motions, and policies/procedures set forth by the Board. The FY 2013-2014 adopted budget of the county is approximately $123 million and the county employees over 350 people in 31 departments of the administration. Other organizations of the county include, the Clerk of Courts with about 75 positions, Sheriff's Office with about 340 positions, County Appraisers Office with about 30 positions, Tax Collectors Office with about 40 positions, and Elections Office with 5 positions. In all there are about 860 positions in Highlands County government.

=== Law Enforcement ===
Highlands County Sheriffs Office is the primary law enforcement agency for the non incorporated areas of Highlands County, Paul Blackman is the Sheriff. The City of Sebring and Town of Lake Placid have their own respective police departments. Avon Park Police Department closed its doors in 2015, the Sheriffs Office is now the primary law enforcement agency for the town. All public safety in Highlands County utilize a Motorola P25 Trunked Radio System which was initiated by Polk County. Highlands and Hardee Counties have piggybacked onto the system. To date, Highlands County Law Enforcement is the only law enforcement on the entire system to use 24/7 ADP encryption.

== Politics ==
Highlands County, like the relatively nearby southwest coast, is strongly Republican: the last Democrat to win a majority in the county was Harry Truman in 1948. Like North Florida, but unlike the southwest coast, George Wallace was able to outpoll the Democratic Party here in 1968, and only in 1992 and 1996 has the Republican candidate not won an absolute majority since.

United States presidential election results for Highlands County, Florida
Year	Republican		Democratic		Third party(ies)	
Year	No.	%	No.	%	No.	%
1924	265	33.38%	457	57.56%	72	9.07%
1928	1,393	66.52%	669	31.95%	32	1.53%
1932	851	35.82%	1,525	64.18%	0	0.00%
1936	842	30.73%	1,898	69.27%	0	0.00%
1940	878	28.39%	2,215	71.61%	0	0.00%
1944	874	29.26%	2,113	70.74%	0	0.00%
1948	1,471	34.53%	2,257	52.98%	532	12.49%
1952	2,952	51.90%	2,736	48.10%	0	0.00%
1956	3,480	60.25%	2,296	39.75%	0	0.00%
1960	4,369	58.32%	3,122	41.68%	0	0.00%
1964	4,747	52.86%	4,233	47.14%	0	0.00%
1968	4,560	42.95%	2,582	24.32%	3,475	32.73%
1972	9,645	79.49%	2,458	20.26%	30	0.25%
1976	8,317	52.86%	7,218	45.88%	198	1.26%
1980	11,925	61.95%	6,688	34.74%	636	3.30%
1984	16,474	69.53%	7,217	30.46%	3	0.01%
1988	16,723	67.05%	8,091	32.44%	127	0.51%
1992	14,499	44.76%	11,237	34.69%	6,655	20.55%
1996	15,617	46.32%	14,250	42.27%	3,847	11.41%
2000	20,207	57.48%	14,169	40.31%	776	2.21%
2004	25,878	62.36%	15,347	36.98%	271	0.65%
2008	26,221	58.37%	18,135	40.37%	566	1.26%
2012	25,915	60.92%	16,148	37.96%	478	1.12%
2016	29,565	64.26%	14,937	32.46%	1,509	3.28%
2020	34,873	66.75%	16,938	32.42%	432	0.83%
2024	36,382	70.09%	15,227	29.34%	296	0.57%

== Economy ==
=== Top employers ===
The top private employers of Highlands County are as follows:
1. Advent Health Hospital (1500)
2. Walmart (796)
3. Agero (600)
4. Highlands Regional Medical Center (413)
5. Delray Plants (350)
6. Palms of Sebring (257)
7. Alan Jay Automotive Network (250)
8. Lake Placid Health Care (210)
9. Positive Medical Transport (150)
10. E-Stone USA (87)

== Libraries ==
Highlands County is part of the Heartland Library Cooperative which serve Highlands County and some of the surrounding counties in the Florida Heartland, including Glades, DeSoto, Hardee, and Okeechobee. Based in Sebring, the cooperative has seven branches within the Heartland region, with three of those branches in Highlands County: Avon Park, Lake Placid and Sebring.

== Communities ==
=== Cities ===
- Avon Park
- Sebring

=== Town ===
- Lake Placid

=== Unincorporated communities ===
- Avon Park Lakes
- Brighton
- Cornwell
- DeSoto City
- Fort Basinger
- Fort Kissimmee
- Hicoria
- Lorida
- Placid Lakes
- Spring Lake
- Sun 'n Lake of Sebring
- Sylvan Shores
- Venus

== See also ==
- Florida Heartland
- Lake Denton
- National Register of Historic Places listings in Highlands County, Florida
- Samaritan's Touch Care Center
