= Lake Istokpoga =

Lake in the state of Florida, United States

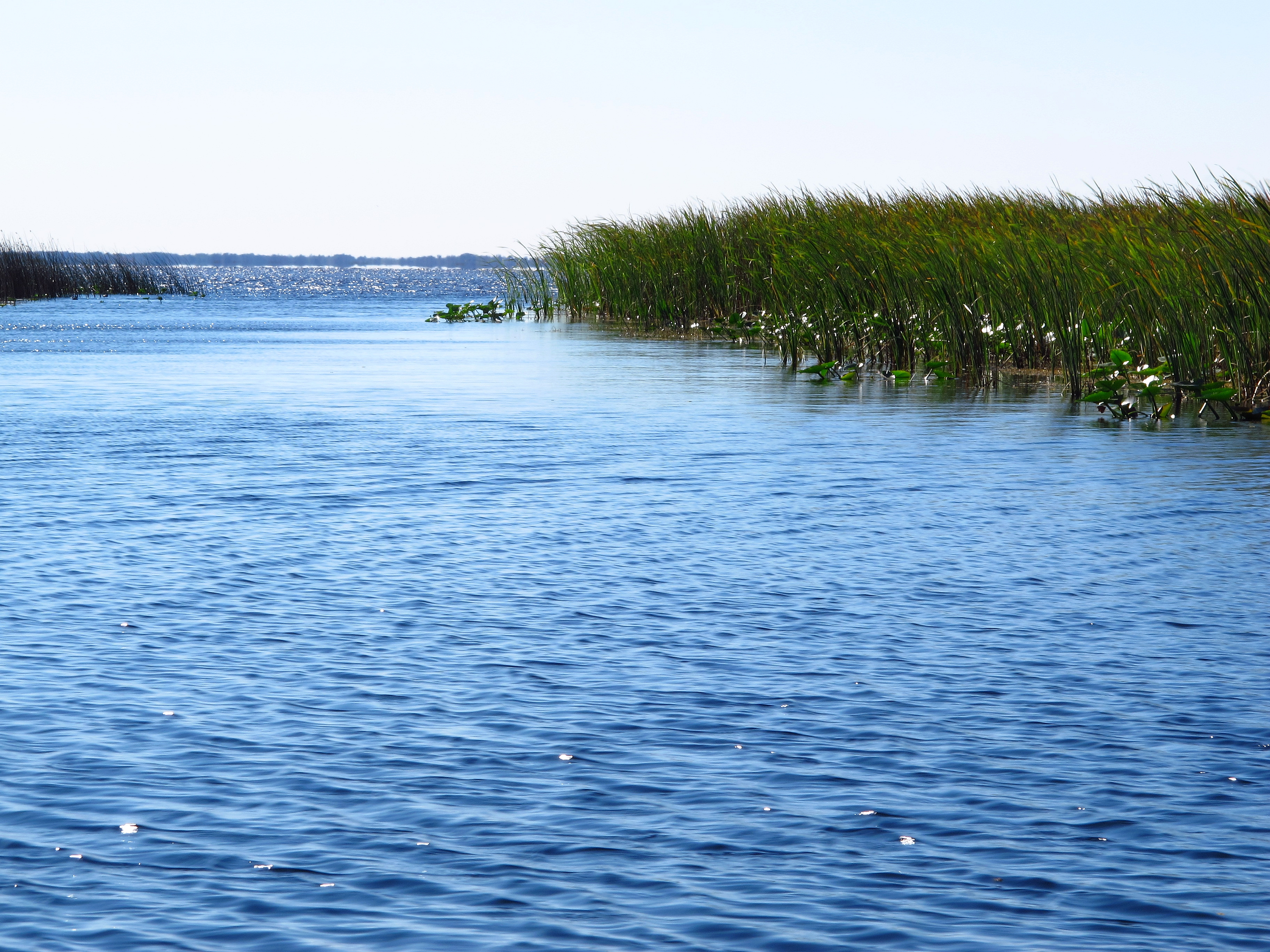

- Location within Florida Location within the United States
- Location: Highlands County, Florida
- Coordinates: 27°22′N 81°17′W
- Type: Fishing
- Primary inflows: Arbuckle Creek, Josephine Creek
- Primary outflows: C41 canal
- Basin countries: United States
- Max. length: 10 miles (16 km)
- Max. width: 5 miles (8 km)
- Surface area: 26,762.9 acres (108 km^{2})
- Average depth: 4 feet (1.2 m)
- Max. depth: 10 feet (3.0 m)
- Surface elevation: 37.5–39.5 ft (11.4–12.0 m)
- Islands: Big, Bumble Bee
- Settlements: Lorida, Sebring, Lake Placid

Lake Istokpoga is a 26,762.9-acre (108.306 km^{2}) freshwater lake in Highlands County, Florida. It is fed by two creeks, Arbuckle Creek and Josephine Creek. The oblong-shaped lake is approximately 5 miles (8.0 km) wide by 10 miles (16 km) long. It is considered the fifth largest lake in the state of Florida. Despite its area, it is very shallow, with an average depth of only 4 feet (1.2 m). Maximum depth is 10 feet (3.0 m). As a result, boaters must be cautious to not become stranded in muck near the shore line. Bass and pontoon boats are the most commonly used watercraft, with some use of airboats. With such shallowness, this lake is extremely dangerous for boaters during windstorms, as the waves get quite high.

Boating and fishing are popular activities at this lake. There are at least half a dozen fish camps on Lake Istokpoga. Several of these fish camps book visitors for fishing trips and they also have cabins and hook up for campers, for overnight stays. The amenities on the lake are 5 public boat ramps and 2 public parks, one on the lake's north side and the other on the south east corner. Most of the shoreline is undeveloped and there are two islands, Big and Bumble Bee, in the lake's interior. Some residential properties and private boat docks and beaches dot areas on the shore.

Local legend is that the word Istokpoga is of the Seminole language meaning "a lake where someone was killed in the water" because a group of Seminole Indians attempted to cross the lake and were bogged in the mire and swallowed by whirlpools.

Lake Istokpoga serves as a home for the snail kite.
