= Sanborn House =

Sanborn House may refer to:

- Sanborn House (Winchester, Massachusetts), listed on the NRHP in Massachusetts
- Rev. Peter Sanborn House, Reading, MA, listed on the NRHP in Massachusetts
- Sanborn Hall (Delaware, Ohio), listed on the NRHP in Ohio
- Henry B. and Ellen M. Sanborn House, Amarillo, TX, listed on the NRHP in Texas
