= Charles Manning =

Charles Manning may refer to:

- Charles Manning (academic) (1894–1978), South African international relations scholar
- Charles Manning (rugby league) (c. 1890–1967), New Zealand rugby league player
- Charles H. Manning (engineer) (1844–1919), American naval officer and engineer
- Charles H. Manning (photographer) (c. 1848–1895), photographer and associate of Townsend Duryea
- Charles Manning (basketball) (born 1998), American basketball player
- Charlie Manning (Charles Nelson Manning, born 1979), American baseball relief pitcher

== See also ==
- Manning (surname)
- Charles Manning House, historic house in Reading, Massachusetts
