= Smith Shoe Shop =

- U.S. National Register of Historic Places
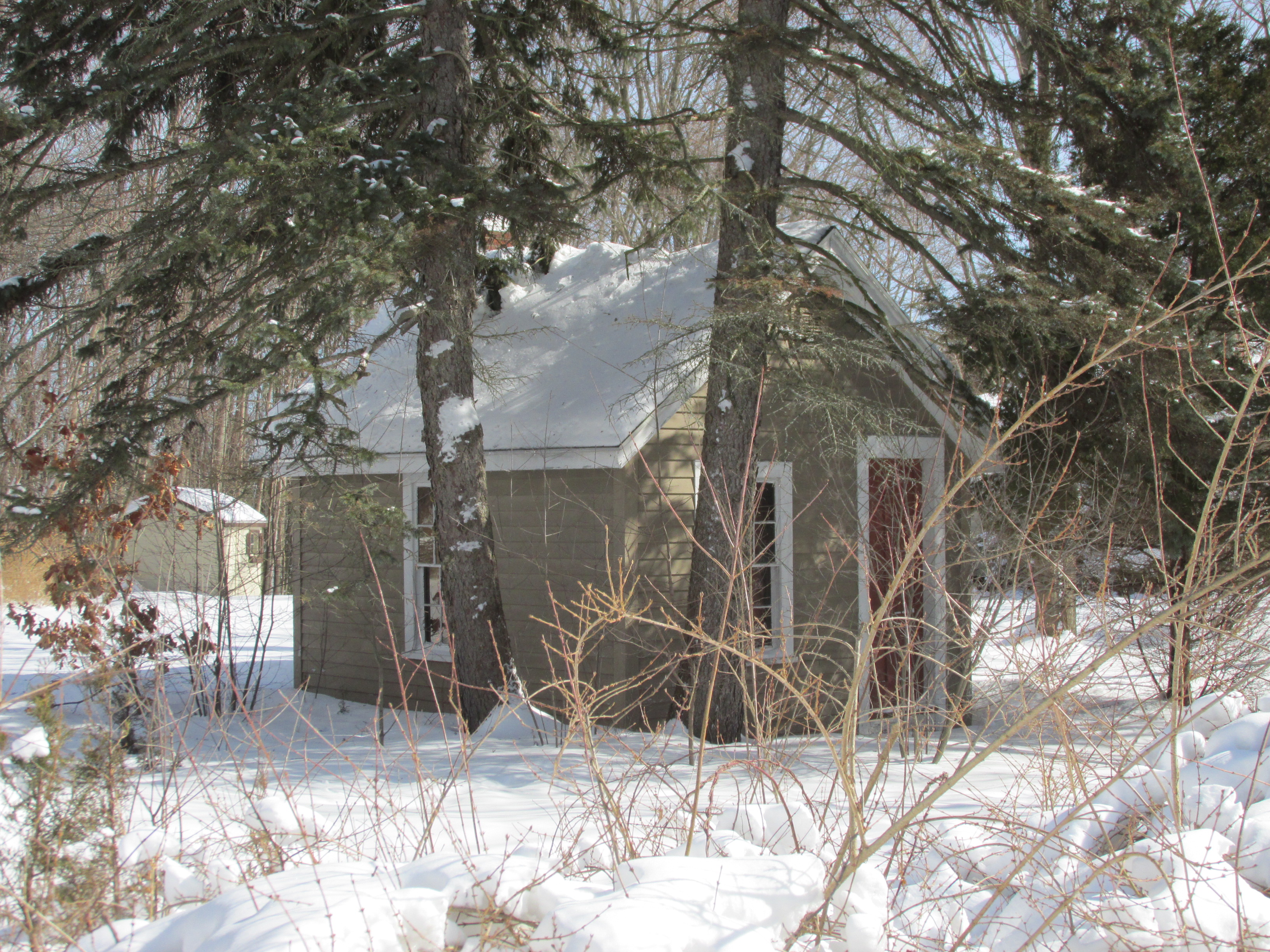
- Outbuilding at 273 Haverhill Street

- Location within Massachusetts Location within the United States
- Location: Reading, Massachusetts
- Coordinates: 42°32′18.68″N 71°5′13.19″W
- Built: 1845
- MPS: Reading MRA
- NRHP reference No.: 85000550
- Added to NRHP: February 1, 1985

The Smith Shoe Shop is a historic ten-footer shoe workshop at 273 Haverhill Street in Reading, Massachusetts. The small outbuilding is one of a few surviving remnants of the local cottage industry of shoemaking that flourished in the 19th century. These were called "ten footers" because of their relatively small size, and fell out of favor after the introduction of factory-based methods for shoe production in the decades following the American Civil War.

The building was listed on the National Register of Historic Places in 1985.

== See also ==
- National Register of Historic Places listings in Reading, Massachusetts
- National Register of Historic Places listings in Middlesex County, Massachusetts
