= House at 242 Summer Avenue =

Historic house in Massachusetts, United States

- U.S. National Register of Historic Places
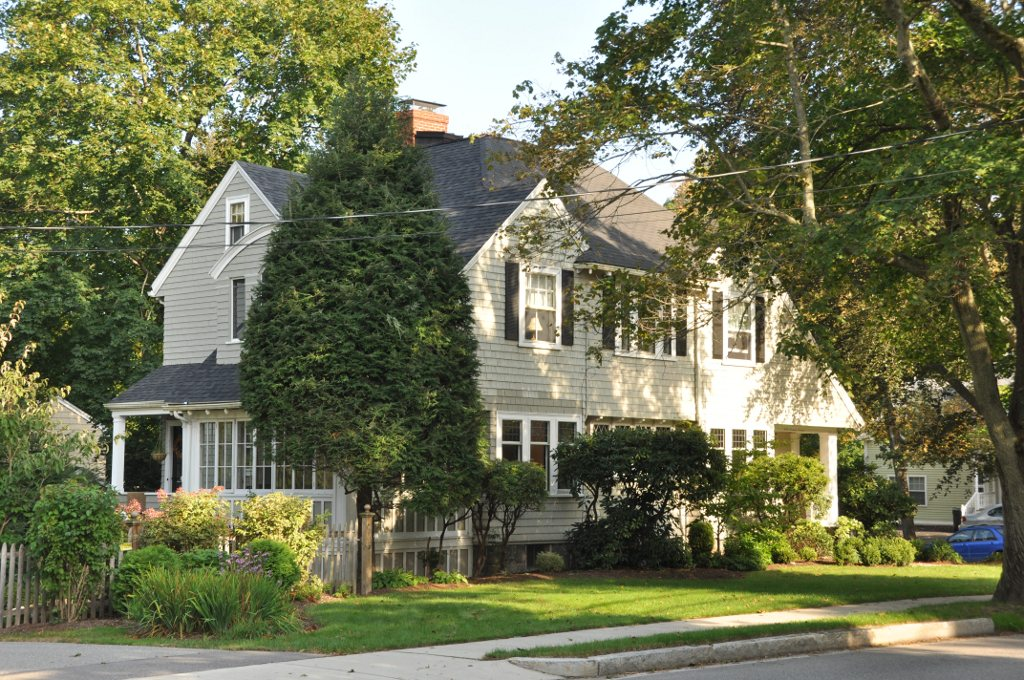

- Location within Massachusetts Location within the United States
- Location: Reading, Massachusetts
- Coordinates: 42°31′10″N 71°6′56″W
- Built: 1912; 114 years ago
- Architectural style: Shingle Style
- MPS: Reading MRA
- NRHP reference No.: 84002681
- Added to NRHP: July 19, 1984

242 Summer Avenue is a historic house located in Reading, Massachusetts. It is locally significant as a well-preserved example of a Shingle style house.

== Description and history ==
The two-story wood-frame house was built in 1912; it has irregular massing with a hip roof. There are two gable-topped pavilions framing a central section of the front facade, which have roof sections extending to the sides of the house that shelter porches (the front entry to the right, a sitting porch to the left). First-floor windows on the pavilions are grouped in a way reminiscent of Prairie style design.

The house was listed on the National Register of Historic Places on July 19, 1984.

== See also ==
- National Register of Historic Places listings in Reading, Massachusetts
- National Register of Historic Places listings in Middlesex County, Massachusetts
