= Durgin House =

Historic house in Massachusetts, United States

- U.S. National Register of Historic Places
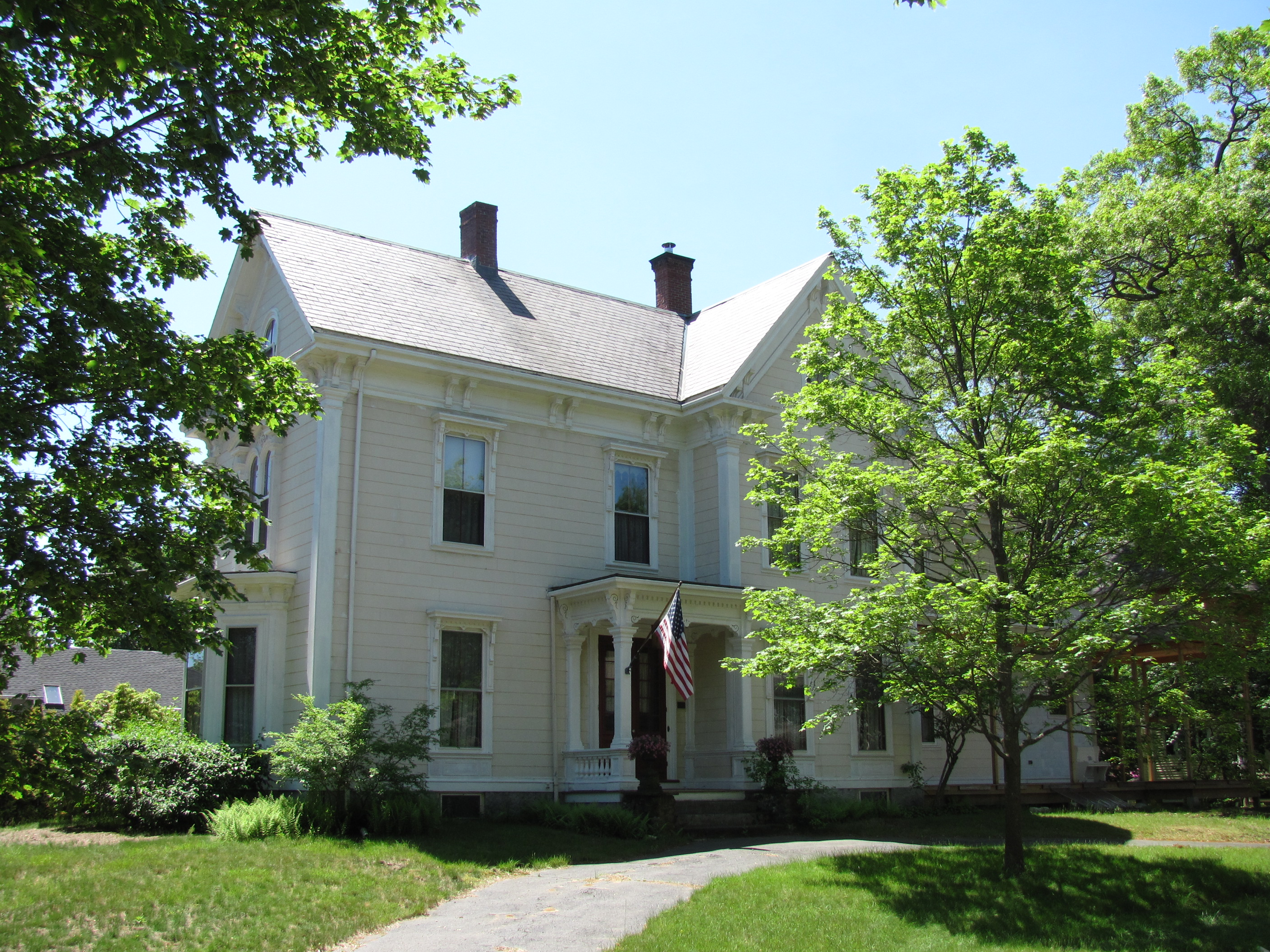
- Durgin House

- Location within Massachusetts Location within the United States
- Location: 66 Prospect Street, Reading, Massachusetts
- Coordinates: 42°31′20″N 71°7′12″W
- Built: 1872
- Architectural style: Italianate
- MPS: Reading MRA
- NRHP reference No.: 84002574
- Added to NRHP: July 19, 1984

The Durgin House is a historic house in Reading, Massachusetts. Built in 1872 by Boston businessman William Durgin, this 2 1/2-story wood-frame house is one of the finest Italianate houses in the town. It follows a cross-gable plan, with a pair of small side porches and bay windows on the main gable ends. The porches are supported by chamfered posts on pedestals, and feature roof lines with a denticulated cornice and brackets. The main roof line also features paired decorative brackets. There are round-headed windows in the gable ends.

The house was listed on the National Register of Historic Places in 1984.

== See also ==
- National Register of Historic Places listings in Reading, Massachusetts
- National Register of Historic Places listings in Middlesex County, Massachusetts
