= Dewey Place =

Historic house in Massachusetts, United States

- U.S. National Register of Historic Places
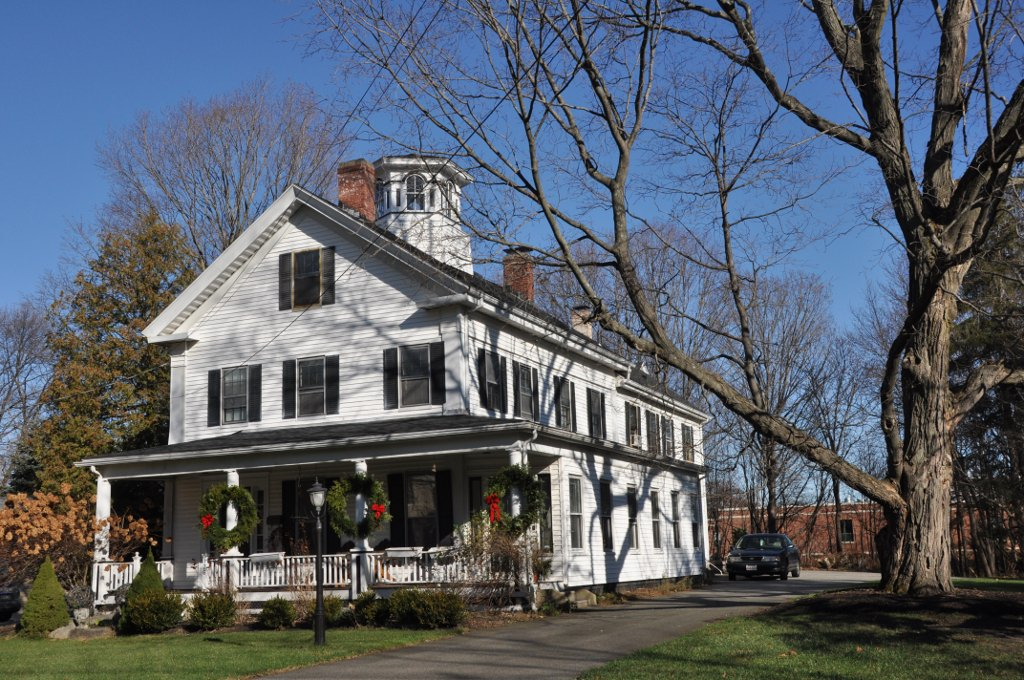

- Location within Massachusetts Location within the United States
- Location: 176 Summer Avenue, Reading, Massachusetts
- Coordinates: 42°31′20.67″N 71°7′1.8″W
- Built: 1853
- Architectural style: Greek Revival, Italianate
- MPS: Reading MRA
- NRHP reference No.: 84002567
- Added to NRHP: July 19, 1984

Dewey Place is a historic house in Reading, Massachusetts. The 2 1/2-story wood-frame house was built c. 1853 by John Mansfield, a shoe manufacturer, in what was then a popular upper-class neighborhood of the town. The house as classic Italianate design, with three bays across the front and a cupola (a somewhat common Italianate feature in Reading houses of the period). The front porch appears to be a 20th-century alteration. The house's most prominent owner was Francis O. Dewey, a major dealer in glass lantern globes.

The house was listed on the National Register of Historic Places in 1984.

== See also ==
- National Register of Historic Places listings in Reading, Massachusetts
- National Register of Historic Places listings in Middlesex County, Massachusetts
