= Brande House =

Historic house in Massachusetts, United States

- U.S. National Register of Historic Places
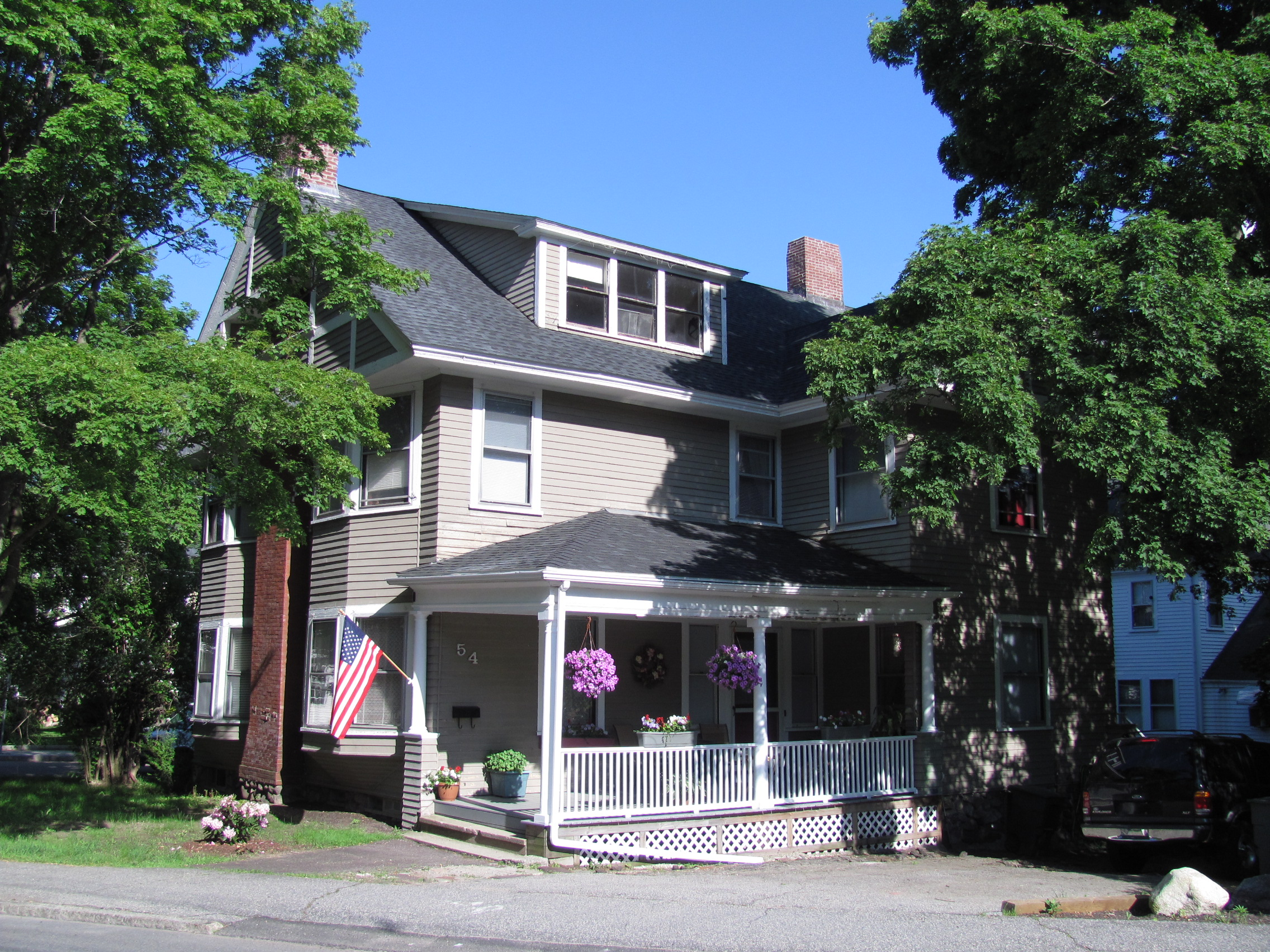
- Brande House

- Location within Massachusetts Location within the United States
- Location: 54 Woburn St., Reading, Massachusetts
- Coordinates: 42°31′26″N 71°6′23″W
- Area: less than one acre
- Built: 1895
- Architectural style: Queen Anne
- MPS: Reading MRA
- NRHP reference No.: 84002516
- Added to NRHP: July 29, 1984

The Brande House is a historic house in Reading, Massachusetts. Built in 1895, the house is a distinctive local example of a Queen Anne Victorian with Shingle and Stick style features. It was listed on the National Register of Historic Places in 1984.

== Description and history ==
The Brande House stands just west of downtown Reading, at the southwest corner of Summer and Linden Street. It is a 2 1/2-story wood-frame structure, with a gabled roof and exterior clad in wooden shingles and clapboards. Gabled sections project from either side, with a large porch in the corner created by the section on the right, where the main entrance is located, and a smaller porch on the corner on the left, facing Linden Street. The right-hand porch is covered by a hip roof, supported by round columns, and has a simple balustrade with square balusters. The front facade is two bays wide, with a brick chimney rising at the center, flanked by two-story polygonal bays. The gable above has a recessed porch and applied Stick style woodwork. The left side gable section has three round windows in the gable, and the porch has a Stick style balustrade.

The house was built in 1895 by Dr. Mahlon Brande, a local dentist who also invested in real estate. Its first documented resident, Fred Sperry, was a merchant selling furniture and rugs at a shop in Boston.

== See also ==
- National Register of Historic Places listings in Reading, Massachusetts
- National Register of Historic Places listings in Middlesex County, Massachusetts
