= House at 483 Summer Avenue =

Historic house in Massachusetts, United States

- U.S. National Register of Historic Places
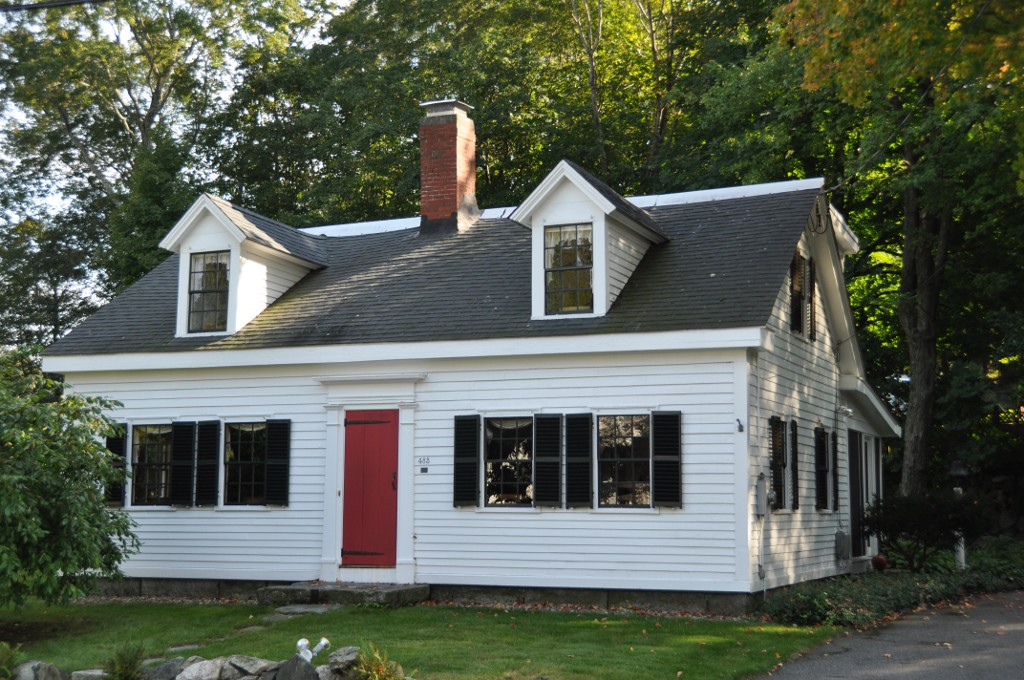

- Location within Massachusetts Location within the United States
- Location: 483 Summer Ave., Reading, Massachusetts
- Coordinates: 42°30′38″N 71°6′21″W
- Built: 1830
- Architectural style: Federal
- MPS: Reading MRA
- NRHP reference No.: 84002652
- Added to NRHP: July 19, 1984

The House at 483 Summer Avenue in Reading, Massachusetts, USA, is a modestly decorated vernacular Federal style cottage. The 1 1/2-story wood-frame house was built c. 1830, late for a Federal style building. Its significant Federal features are its five-bay facade, side-gable roof, and the door surround, which has pilasters supporting a tall entablature with a projecting cornice. The house is finished in wooden clapboards, and has two gabled dormers projecting from the front roof.

The house was listed on the National Register of Historic Places in 1984.

== See also ==
- National Register of Historic Places listings in Reading, Massachusetts
- National Register of Historic Places listings in Middlesex County, Massachusetts
