= Pratt House (Reading, Massachusetts) =

Historic house in Massachusetts, United States

- U.S. National Register of Historic Places
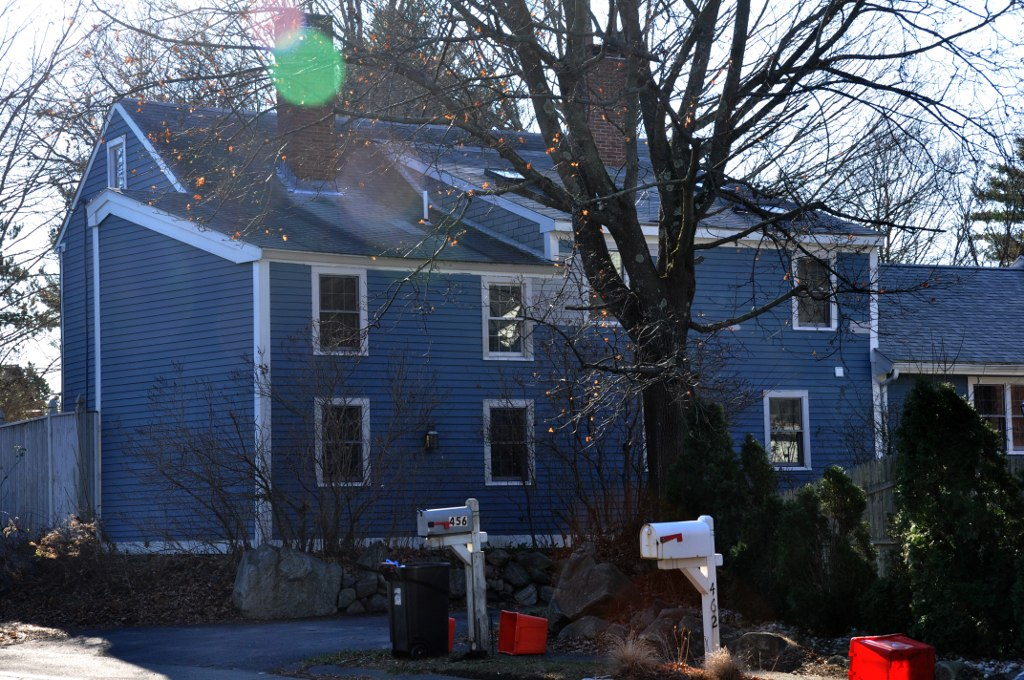

- Location within Massachusetts Location within the United States
- Location: 456 Haverhill Street, Reading, Massachusetts
- Coordinates: 42°32′46″N 71°5′31″W
- Built: 1809
- Architectural style: Georgian, Federal
- MPS: Reading MRA
- NRHP reference No.: 84002797
- Added to NRHP: July 19, 1984

The Pratt House is a historic house in Reading, Massachusetts. The two-story wood-frame house was built in 1809 and is stylistically a transitional Georgian/Federal structure. The main portion of the house is a single room deep, and there is a two-story shed-roof extension on the rear. The house belonged to various members of the locally prominent Pratt family, including Joseph Pratt, the first Reading shoe manufacturer to use a stitching machine.

The house was listed on the National Register of Historic Places in 1984.

== See also ==
- National Register of Historic Places listings in Reading, Massachusetts
- National Register of Historic Places listings in Middlesex County, Massachusetts
