= House at 129 High Street =

Historic house in Massachusetts, United States

- U.S. National Register of Historic Places
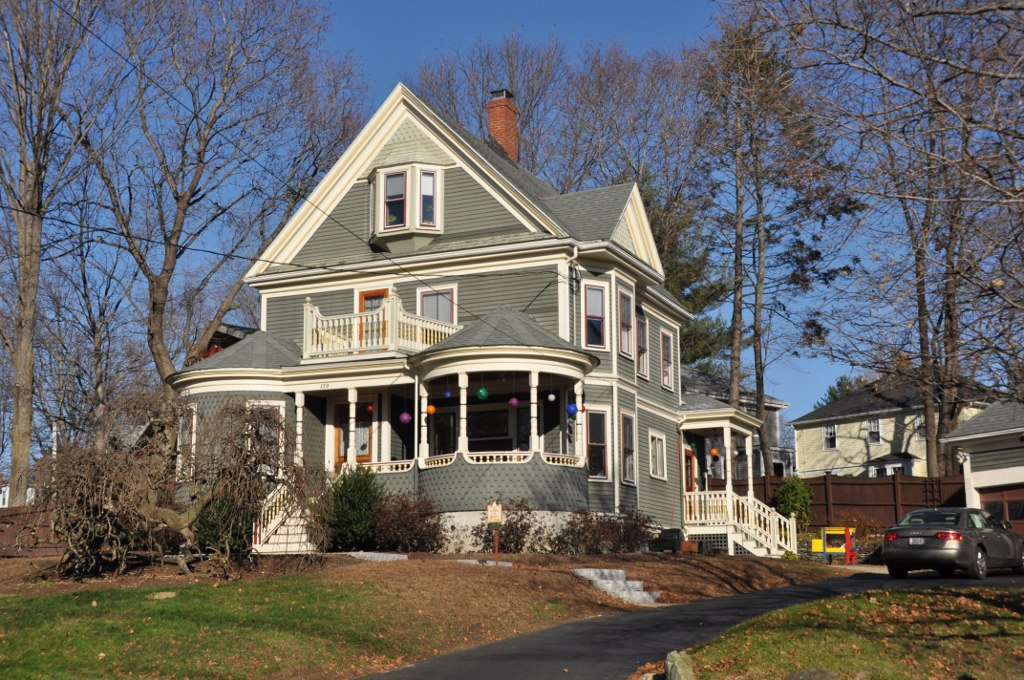

- Location within Massachusetts Location within the United States
- Interactive map of House at 129 High Street
- Location: 129 High St., Reading, Massachusetts
- Coordinates: 42°31′27″N 71°6′42″W
- Built: 1896
- Architectural style: Queen Anne
- MPS: Reading MRA
- NRHP reference No.: 84002664
- Added to NRHP: July 19, 1984

129 High Street in Reading, Massachusetts, is a well-preserved, modestly scaled Queen Anne Victorian house. Built sometime in the 1890s, it typifies local Victorian architecture of the period, in a neighborhood that was once built out with many similar homes. It was listed on the National Register of Historic Places in 1984.

== Description and history ==
129 High Street is located northwest of downtown Reading, on the northeast side of High Street between Dudley and Mount Vernon Streets. It is a 2 1/2-story wood-frame structure, with a front-facing gabled roof and mostly clapboarded exterior. Smaller gabled sections project to each side, that on the left side rectangular in shape, the one on the right above a two-story polygonal window bay. The dominant features of the front facade are a central second-floor balcony, and single-story semicircular projections with conical roofs at the outer bays. The right projection is a porch, with turned posts and balusters. The left bay is enclosed. Both the left bay and the skirt below the porch are finished in square tooth-cut shingling. The second-floor porch also has turned posts and balusters, the posts topped by round newels. In the attic gable is a projecting oriel window, its roof covered with shingles that extend across the decreasing width of the gable peak. At the very top of the peak, the shingles are again cut with square teeth. A period carriage house, with a distinctive pyramidal roof capped by a square cupola, now serves as a garage.

The neighborhood where the house was built was, as late as the 1870s, part of a larger country estate. It was then subdivided and developed as a residential commuter suburb for middle and upper class workers who commuted to Boston for work.

== See also ==
- National Register of Historic Places listings in Reading, Massachusetts
- National Register of Historic Places listings in Middlesex County, Massachusetts
