= House at 44 Temple Street =

Historic house in Massachusetts, United States

- U.S. National Register of Historic Places
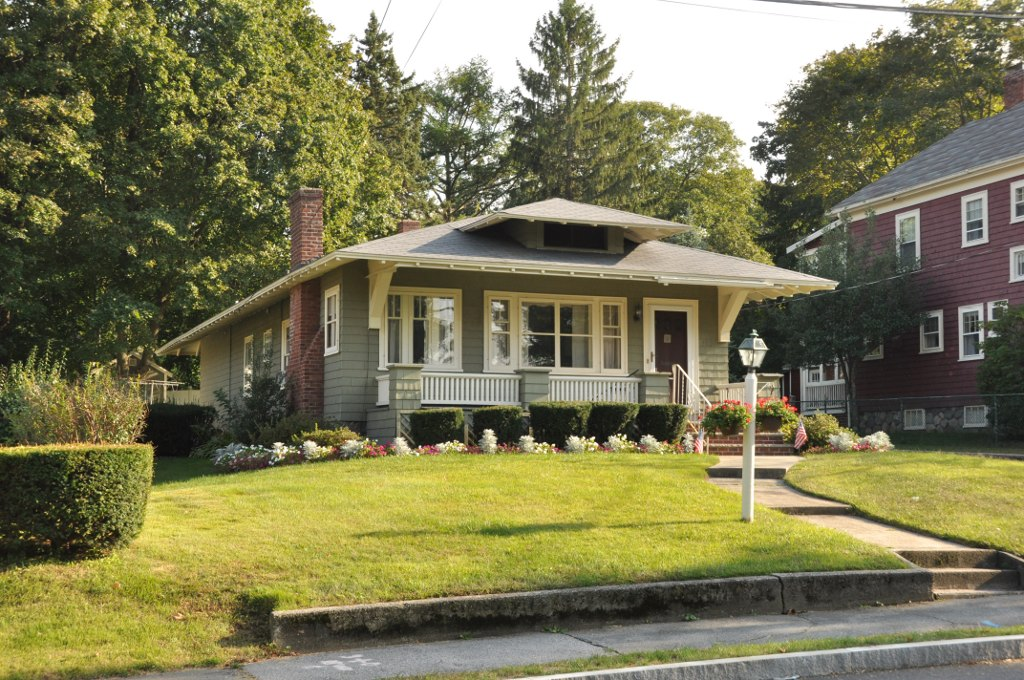

- Location within Massachusetts Location within the United States
- Location: 44 Temple St., Reading, Massachusetts
- Coordinates: 42°31′31″N 71°6′3″W
- Built: 1910
- Architectural style: Greek Revival, Italianate
- MPS: Reading MRA
- NRHP reference No.: 84002650
- Added to NRHP: July 19, 1984

The House at 44 Temple Street in Reading, Massachusetts is an excellent local example of the Bungalow style of architecture. Built c. 1910, it has a low hip roof with exceptionally wide eaves supported by exposed rafters. The front of the roof is further supported by two large decorative knee braces. Large square shingled piers anchor the balustrade of the front porch. One of its early owners, Annie Bliss, wrote a column in the local Reading Chronicle, and ran a candy shop out of her home.

The house was listed on the National Register of Historic Places in 1984.

== See also ==
- National Register of Historic Places listings in Reading, Massachusetts
- National Register of Historic Places listings in Middlesex County, Massachusetts
