= Brackett House (Reading, Massachusetts) =

Historic house in Massachusetts, United States

- U.S. National Register of Historic Places
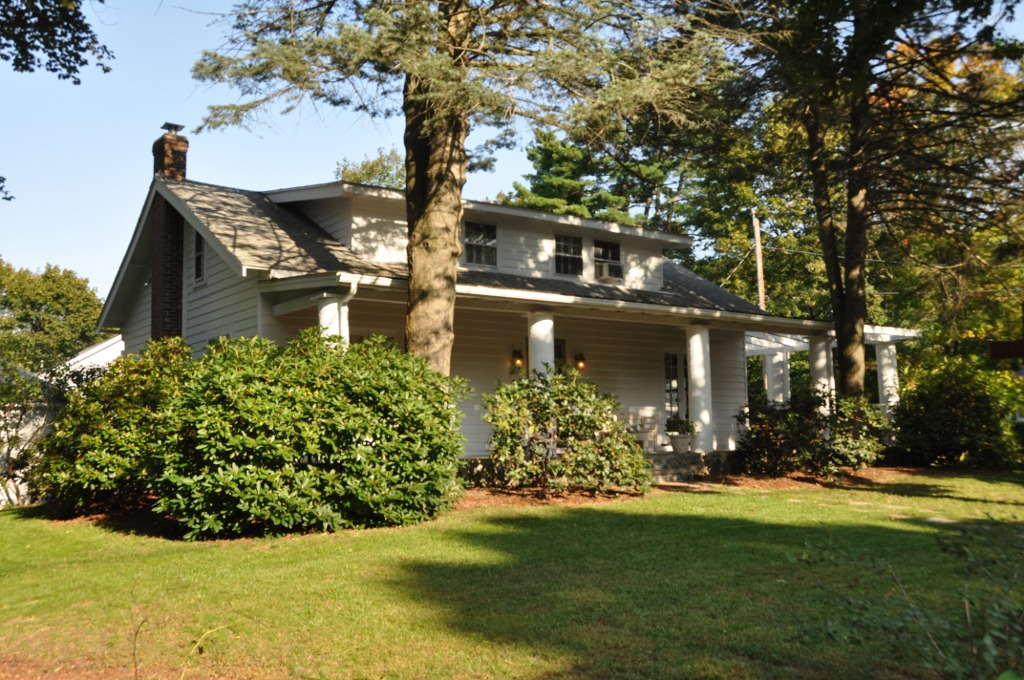

- Location within Massachusetts Location within the United States
- Location: 276 Summer Ave., Reading, Massachusetts
- Coordinates: 42°31′4″N 71°6′52″W
- Area: less than one acre
- Built: 1920
- Architectural style: Bungalow/Craftsman
- MPS: Reading MRA
- NRHP reference No.: 84002515
- Added to NRHP: July 19, 1984

The Brackett House is a historic house in Reading, Massachusetts. Built during a local residential construction boom in 1920, it is Reading's best example of Bungalow style architecture. It was listed on the National Register of Historic Places in 1984.

== Description and history ==
The Brackett House stands in a large residential area southwest of downtown Reading, at the northeast corner of Summer Street and Nichols Lane. Summer Street is one of the area's through roads, and Nichols Lane is a short dead-end street with later infill construction. The house is a 1 1/2-story wood-frame structure, with a broad shallow-pitch gable roof and wide clapboard siding. The front face of the roof has a wide shed-roof dormer at its center. The house's most prominent feature is its porch, which wraps across the front and around the right side. It is supported by heavy stucco columns in front, with exposed rafter ends showing in the ceiling. On the right side of the house, the porch is open, with a pergola-like environment, with an enclosed section further back. The front facade is three bays wide, with full-length narrow French doors in the outer bays.

The house was built in 1920, during a period of rapid growth of housing in the town. It was built as infill on farmland that had first seen residential subdivision late in the 19th century. It is the town's best example of Bungalow architecture.

== See also ==
- National Register of Historic Places listings in Reading, Massachusetts
- National Register of Historic Places listings in Middlesex County, Massachusetts
