= House at 206 West Street =

Historic house in Massachusetts, United States

- U.S. National Register of Historic Places
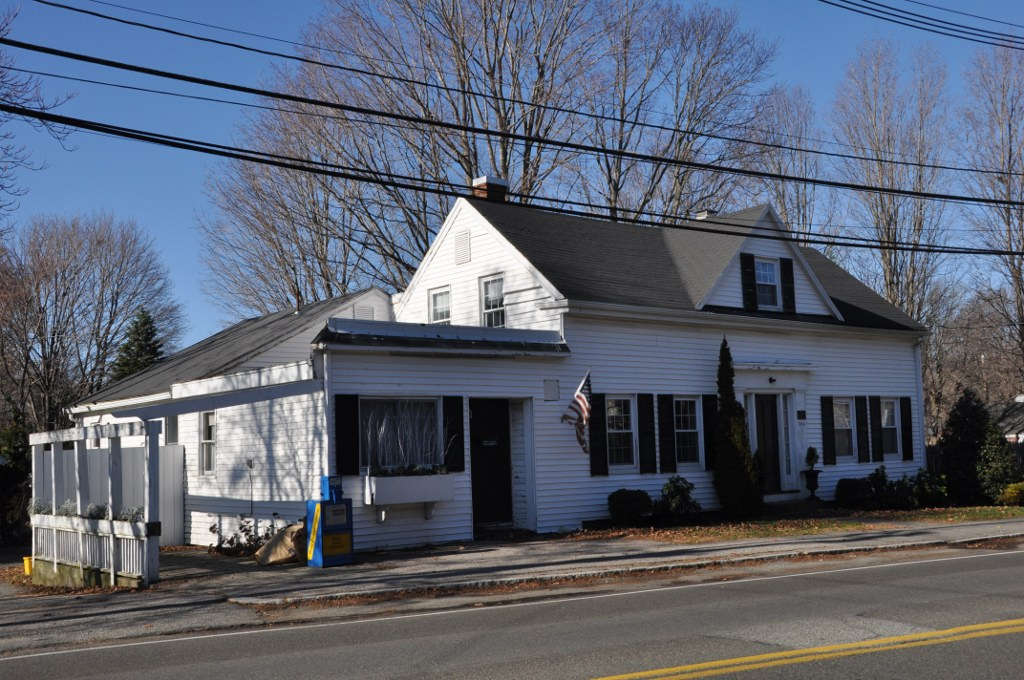

- Location within Massachusetts Location within the United States
- Location: 206 West St., Reading, Massachusetts
- Coordinates: 42°31′2.9″N 71°7′10.76″W
- Built: 1831
- Architectural style: Greek Revival
- MPS: Reading MRA
- NRHP reference No.: 84002680
- Added to NRHP: July 19, 1984

206 West Street is historic house located in Reading, Massachusetts. It is locally significant as a well-preserved example of a Greek Revival cottage.

== Description and history ==
Its date of construction is uncertain, but appears to fall within the period of Greek Revival popularity in Reading, between 1831 and 1857. The house has side gables (unlike the more typical Greek Revival front gable forms), with a gabled dormer above the center entry. The door is flanked by full-length sidelight windows and pilasters, which support a tall entablature. The house is believed to be associated with J.B. Leathe, a local shop owner and civic leader.

The house was listed on the National Register of Historic Places on July 19, 1984.

== See also ==
- National Register of Historic Places listings in Reading, Massachusetts
- National Register of Historic Places listings in Middlesex County, Massachusetts
