= National Register of Historic Places listings in Reading, Massachusetts =

This is a list of properties and historic districts in Reading, Massachusetts, copied from the National Register of Historic Places. These are in Middlesex County, Massachusetts.

The locations of National Register properties and districts (at least for all showing latitude and longitude coordinates below) may be seen in an online map by clicking on "Map of all coordinates".

This National Park Service list is complete through NPS recent listings posted May 1, 2026.

== Current listings ==
	Name on the Register	Image	Date listed	Location	Description
1	Ace Art Company	Ace Art Company	February 1, 1985 (#85000497)	24 Gould St. 42°31′20″N 71°06′21″W	Demolished
2	Joseph Bancroft House	Joseph Bancroft House	July 19, 1984 (#84002467)	101 Lowell St. 42°31′41″N 71°06′32″W	
3	Samuel Bancroft House	Samuel Bancroft House	July 19, 1984 (#84002471)	232 West St. 42°31′07″N 71°07′13″W	
4	Wendell Bancroft House	Wendell Bancroft House	July 19, 1984 (#84002477)	20 Washington St. 42°31′20″N 71°06′39″W	
5	Edwin Bassett House	Edwin Bassett House	July 19, 1984 (#84002482)	115 Prescott St. 42°31′08″N 71°06′52″W	
6	Batchelder House	Batchelder House	July 19, 1984 (#84002501)	607 Pearl St. 42°33′13″N 71°06′06″W	
7	Alden Batchelder House	Alden Batchelder House	July 19, 1984 (#84002491)	797 Main St. 42°31′42″N 71°06′11″W	
8	George Batchelder House	George Batchelder House	July 19, 1984 (#84002496)	127-129 Franklin St. 42°33′15″N 71°06′18″W	
9	Nathaniel Batchelder House	Nathaniel Batchelder House	July 19, 1984 (#84002503)	71 Franklin St. 42°33′15″N 71°06′03″W	
10	Battell House	Battell House	July 19, 1984 (#84002504)	293 Haverhill St. 42°32′21″N 71°05′18″W	
11	Benjamin Beard House	Benjamin Beard House	July 19, 1984 (#84002505)	251 Ash St. 42°31′00″N 71°06′03″W	
12	Boston and Maine Railroad Depot	Boston and Maine Railroad Depot	July 19, 1984 (#84002509)	Lincoln St. 42°31′17″N 71°06′29″W	
13	Bowser Gazebo	Bowser Gazebo	July 19, 1984 (#84002514)	25 Linden St. 42°31′28″N 71°06′20″W	
14	Brackett House	Brackett House	July 19, 1984 (#84002515)	276 Summer Ave. 42°31′04″N 71°06′52″W	
15	Brande House	Brande House	July 29, 1984 (#84002516)	54 Woburn St. 42°31′26″N 71°06′23″W	
16	Francis Brooks House	Francis Brooks House	July 19, 1984 (#84002524)	78-80 Prescott St. 42°31′10″N 71°06′43″W	
17	Carroll-Hartshorn House	Carroll-Hartshorn House	July 19, 1984 (#84002532)	572 Haverhill St. 42°33′02″N 71°05′49″W	
18	Carter Mansion	Carter Mansion	July 19, 1984 (#84002535)	89 Woburn St. 42°31′24″N 71°06′31″W	
19	Gilman Coggin House	Gilman Coggin House	July 19, 1984 (#84002551)	123 Prescott St. 42°31′07″N 71°06′53″W	
20	Common Historic District	Common Historic District	February 1, 1985 (#85000548)	Roughly bounded by Main, Highland, and Federal Sts. 42°31′37″N 71°06′15″W	
21	Asa M. Cook House	Asa M. Cook House	July 19, 1984 (#84002555)	81 Prospect St. 42°31′24″N 71°07′10″W	
22	Joseph Damon House	Joseph Damon House	July 19, 1984 (#84002559)	178 South St. 42°30′18″N 71°06′59″W	
23	Washington Damon House	Washington Damon House	July 19, 1984 (#84002560)	38 Salem St. 42°31′35″N 71°06′05″W	
24	Dewey Place	Dewey Place	July 19, 1984 (#84002567)	176 Summer Ave. 42°31′21″N 71°07′02″W	
25	Durgin House	Durgin House	July 19, 1984 (#84002574)	66 Prospect St. 42°31′20″N 71°07′12″W	
26	Eaton-Prescott House	Eaton-Prescott House	July 19, 1984 (#84002597)	284 Summer Ave. 42°31′03″N 71°06′52″W	
27	Luther Elliott House	Luther Elliott House	July 19, 1984 (#84002598)	309 Haven St. 42°31′24″N 71°06′03″W	
28	Stephen Hall House	Stephen Hall House	July 19, 1984 (#84002630)	64 Minot St. 42°31′12″N 71°06′20″W	
29	Harnden-Browne House	Harnden-Browne House	February 1, 1985 (#85000498)	60-62 Salem St. 42°31′36″N 71°05′59″W	
30	Timothy Hartshorn House	Timothy Hartshorn House	July 19, 1984 (#84002633)	379 Haverhill St. 42°32′35″N 71°05′22″W	
31	Hartwell House	Hartwell House	July 19, 1984 (#84002635)	121 Willow St. 42°31′49″N 71°07′25″W	
32	Haverhill Street Milestone	Haverhill Street Milestone	February 1, 1985 (#85000499)	Haverhill St. 42°32′18″N 71°05′14″W	
33	Highland School	Highland School	July 19, 1984 (#84002643)	64 Middlesex Ave. 42°31′33″N 71°06′39″W	Now houses the Reading Public Library.
34	House at 11 Beach Street	House at 11 Beach Street	July 19, 1984 (#84002659)	11 Beach St. 42°31′18″N 71°05′41″W	
35	House at 16 Mineral Street	House at 16 Mineral Street	July 19, 1984 (#84002677)	16 Mineral St. 42°31′33″N 71°06′53″W	
36	House at 26 Center Avenue	House at 26 Center Avenue	July 19, 1984 (#84002679)	26 Center Ave. 42°31′05″N 71°06′25″W	
37	House at 42 Salem Street	House at 42 Salem Street	July 19, 1984 (#84002649)	42 Salem St. 42°31′35″N 71°06′02″W	
38	House at 44 Temple Street	House at 44 Temple Street	July 19, 1984 (#84002650)	44 Temple St. 42°31′17″N 71°06′55″W	
39	House at 57 Woburn Street	House at 57 Woburn Street	July 19, 1984 (#84002657)	57 Woburn St. 42°31′27″N 71°06′22″W	
40	House at 77 Howard Street	House at 77 Howard Street	July 19, 1984 (#84002675)	77 Howard St. 42°30′56″N 71°07′08″W	
41	House at 79–81 Salem Street	House at 79–81 Salem Street	July 19, 1984 (#84002676)	79–81 Salem St. 42°31′35″N 71°05′56″W	
42	House at 129 High Street	House at 129 High Street	July 19, 1984 (#84002664)	129 High St. 42°31′27″N 71°06′42″W	
43	House at 199 Summer Avenue	House at 199 Summer Avenue	July 19, 1984 (#84002667)	199 Summer Ave. 42°31′16″N 71°07′01″W	
44	House at 206 West Street	House at 206 West Street	July 19, 1984 (#84002680)	206 West St. 42°31′03″N 71°07′11″W	
45	House at 242 Summer Avenue	House at 242 Summer Avenue	July 19, 1984 (#84002681)	242 Summer Ave. 42°31′10″N 71°06′56″W	
46	House at 322 Haven Street	House at 322 Haven Street	July 19, 1984 (#84002686)	322 Haven St. 42°31′24″N 71°06′01″W	
47	House at 483 Summer Avenue	House at 483 Summer Avenue	July 19, 1984 (#84002652)	483 Summer Ave. 42°30′38″N 71°06′21″W	
48	House at 1177 Main Street	House at 1177 Main Street	July 19, 1984 (#84002668)	1177 Main St. 42°32′47″N 71°06′16″W	
49	Kemp Barn	Kemp Barn	July 19, 1984 (#84002721)	186 Summer Ave. 42°31′19″N 71°07′01″W	
50	Kemp Place	Kemp Place	July 19, 1984 (#84002723)	186 Summer Ave. 42°31′17″N 71°07′02″W	
51	Lewis House	Lewis House	July 19, 1984 (#84002741)	276 Woburn St. 42°31′08″N 71°07′05″W	
52	Charles Manning House	Charles Manning House	July 19, 1984 (#84002744)	145 Salem St. 42°31′36″N 71°05′42″W	
53	Jacob Manning House	Jacob Manning House	July 19, 1984 (#84002745)	140 High St. 42°31′30″N 71°06′44″W	
54	Masonic Block	Masonic Block	September 19, 1984 (#84002746)	600-622 Main St. 42°31′25″N 71°06′11″W	
55	Daniel Nichols Homestead	Daniel Nichols Homestead	July 19, 1984 (#84002753)	434 Haverhill St. 42°32′43″N 71°05′28″W	
56	James Nichols House	James Nichols House	July 19, 1984 (#84002755)	273 Pearl St. 42°32′21″N 71°06′02″W	
57	Jerry Nichols Tavern	Jerry Nichols Tavern	July 19, 1984 (#84002757)	51 Mill St. 42°33′37″N 71°06′29″W	
58	Richard Nichols House	Richard Nichols House	July 19, 1984 (#84002760)	483 Franklin St. 42°32′41″N 71°07′14″W	
59	Octagon House	Octagon House	July 19, 1984 (#84002762)	97 Pleasant St. 42°31′26″N 71°06′03″W	
60	Old Hose House	Old Hose House	July 19, 1984 (#84002769)	1249 Main St. 42°33′00″N 71°06′17″W	
61	Parker House	Parker House	July 19, 1984 (#84002774)	52 Salem St. 42°31′35″N 71°06′01″W	
62	Parker House	Parker House	July 19, 1984 (#84002778)	316 Haven St. 42°31′24″N 71°06′03″W	
63	Parker Tavern	Parker Tavern	August 19, 1975 (#75000286)	103 Washington St. 42°31′15″N 71°06′24″W	
64	Capt. Nathaniel Parker Red House	Capt. Nathaniel Parker Red House	July 19, 1984 (#84002772)	77-83 Ash St. 42°31′20″N 71°06′16″W	
65	Joseph Parker House	Joseph Parker House	July 19, 1984 (#84002781)	107 Grove St. 42°32′12″N 71°07′15″W	
66	Samuel Parker House	Samuel Parker House	July 19, 1984 (#84002783)	132 West St. 42°30′50″N 71°07′17″W	
67	Stillman Parker House	Stillman Parker House	July 19, 1984 (#84002785)	484 Summer Ave. 42°30′39″N 71°06′20″W	
68	William Parker House	William Parker House	July 19, 1984 (#84002791)	55 Walnut St. 42°30′35″N 71°06′29″W	
69	Pearl Street School	Pearl Street School	May 30, 1997 (#97000496)	75 Pearl St. 42°31′50″N 71°05′56″W	
70	Pierce House	Pierce House	July 19, 1984 (#84002794)	128 Salem St. 42°31′38″N 71°05′46″W	
71	Pierce Organ Pipe Factory	Pierce Organ Pipe Factory	July 19, 1984 (#84002795)	10-12 Pierce St. 42°31′40″N 71°05′44″W	
72	Pratt House	Pratt House	July 19, 1984 (#84002797)	456 Haverhill St. 42°32′46″N 71°05′31″W	
73	Stillman Pratt House	Stillman Pratt House	July 19, 1984 (#84002799)	472 Summer Ave. 42°30′40″N 71°06′22″W	
74	Reading Municipal Building	Reading Municipal Building	July 19, 1984 (#84002810)	49 Pleasant St. 42°31′26″N 71°06′07″W	
75	Reading Municipal Light and Power Station	Reading Municipal Light and Power Station	July 19, 1984 (#84002811)	226 Ash St. 42°31′05″N 71°06′05″W	
76	Reading Standpipe	Reading Standpipe	February 1, 1985 (#85000549)	Auburn and Beacon Sts. 42°31′52″N 71°06′21″W	Demolished.
77	Roberts House	Roberts House	July 19, 1984 (#84002815)	59 Prospect St. 42°31′20″N 71°07′08″W	
78	Rowhouses at 256–274 Haven Street	Rowhouses at 256–274 Haven Street	July 19, 1984 (#84002817)	256–274 Haven St. 42°31′25″N 71°06′07″W	
79	Rev. Peter Sanborn House	Rev. Peter Sanborn House	July 19, 1984 (#84002819)	55 Lowell St. 42°31′37″N 71°06′23″W	
80	Smith Shoe Shop	Smith Shoe Shop	February 1, 1985 (#85000550)	273 Haverhill St. 42°32′19″N 71°05′13″W	
81	Thomas Symonds House	Thomas Symonds House	July 19, 1984 (#84002833)	320 Haverhill St. 42°32′25″N 71°05′22″W	
82	Joseph Temple House	Joseph Temple House	July 19, 1984 (#84002835)	42 Chute St. 42°31′25″N 71°06′33″W	
83	Mark Temple House	Mark Temple House	July 19, 1984 (#84002838)	141 Summer Ave. 42°31′25″N 71°07′09″W	
84	Walnut Street School	Walnut Street School	July 19, 1984 (#84002841)	55 Hopkins St. 42°30′31″N 71°06′25″W	Currently home to the Quannapowitt Players community theatre.
85	Charles Wells House	Charles Wells House	July 19, 1984 (#84002842)	99 Prescott St. 42°31′09″N 71°06′51″W	
86	Ephraim Weston House	Ephraim Weston House	July 19, 1984 (#84002845)	229 West St. 42°31′06″N 71°07′12″W	Incorrectly listed as "Ephrain Weston House" at 224 West St.
87	Jabez Weston House	Jabez Weston House	July 19, 1984 (#84002846)	86 West St. 42°30′43″N 71°07′22″W	
88	Wisteria Lodge	Wisteria Lodge	July 19, 1984 (#84002857)	146 Summer Ave. 42°31′25″N 71°07′06″W	
89	Woburn Street Historic District	Woburn Street Historic District	February 1, 1985 (#85000551)	Woburn St. from Temple St. to Summer Ave. 42°31′14″N 71°06′53″W	

== Former listings ==
	Name on the Register	Image	Date listed	Date removed	Location	City or town	Description
1	Samuel Foster House	Samuel Foster House	March 9, 1990 (#90000178)	November 6, 2024	409 Grove St. 42°32′31″N 71°07′37″W		
