= Rowhouses at 256–274 Haven Street =

- U.S. National Register of Historic Places
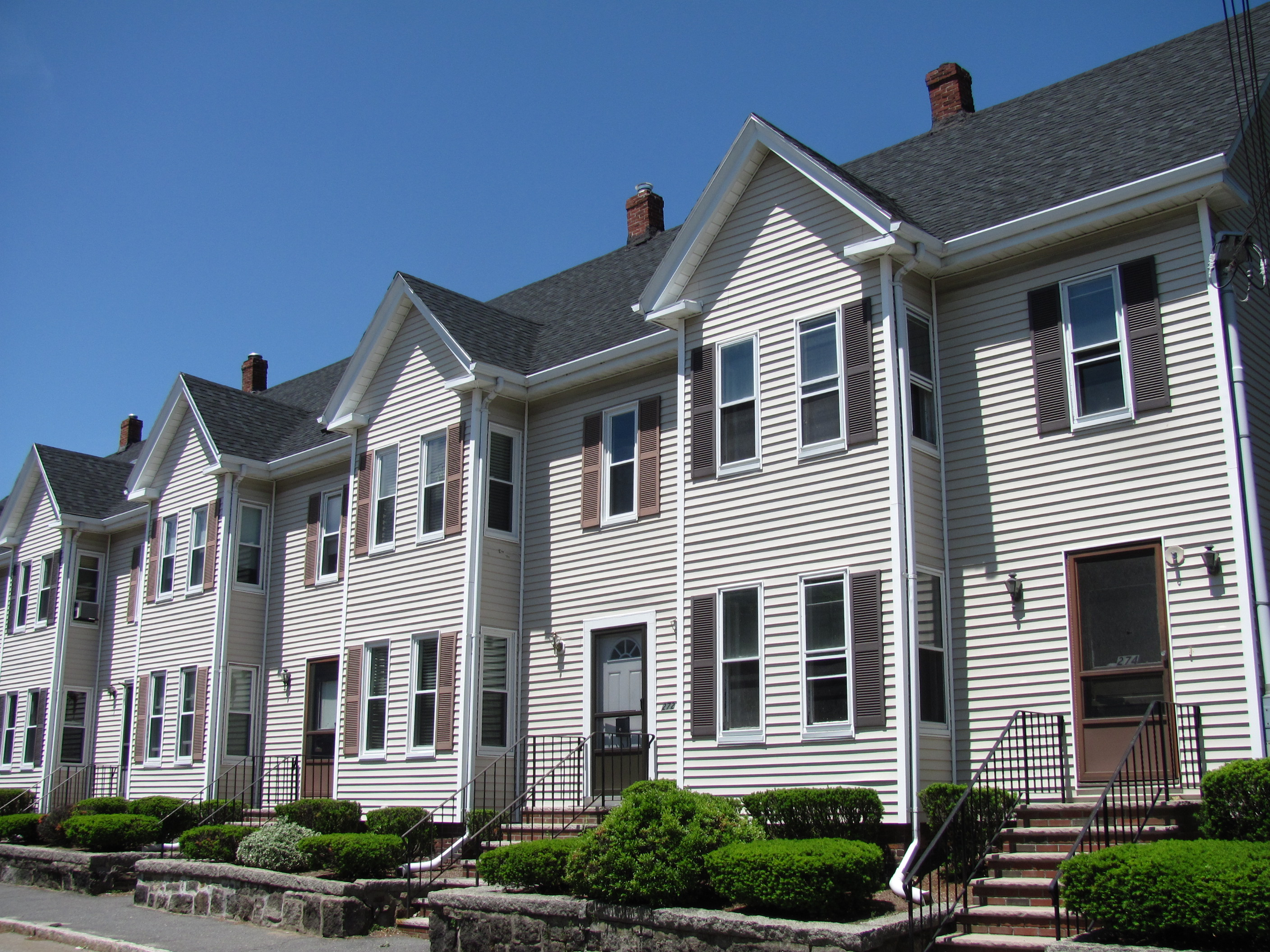

- Location within Massachusetts Location within the United States
- Location: 256–274 Haven Street, Reading, Massachusetts
- Coordinates: 42°31′25″N 71°06′07″W
- Built: 1886
- Architectural style: Italianate
- MPS: Reading MRA
- NRHP reference No.: 84002817
- Added to NRHP: July 19, 1984

The Rowhouses at 256–274 Haven Street (also known as the Edward Manning Houses) are a series of historic rowhouses in Reading, Massachusetts, USA. They were built in 1886 by Edward Manning on the site of a millyard that had been destroyed by fire a few years before. The rowhouses are in a Greek Revival/Italianate style, unusual given that these styles had passed out of fashion by that time. They are the only period rowhouses in Reading.

The rowhouses were listed on the National Register of Historic Places in 1984.

== See also ==
- National Register of Historic Places listings in Reading, Massachusetts
- National Register of Historic Places listings in Middlesex County, Massachusetts
