= Reading Standpipe =

- U.S. National Register of Historic Places
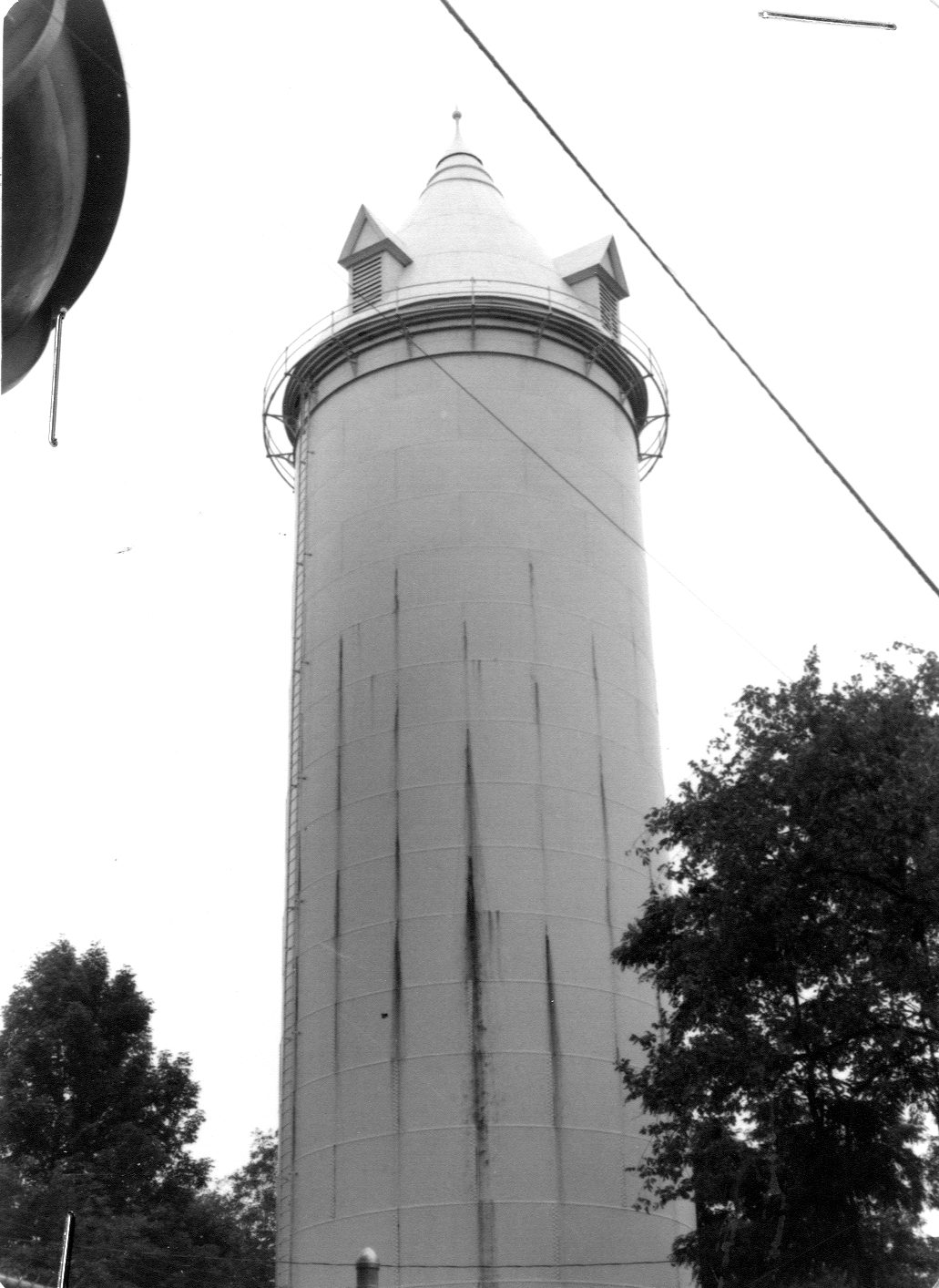
- early 1980s photo

- Location within Massachusetts Location within the United States
- Location: Auburn and Beacon Sts., Reading, Massachusetts
- Coordinates: 42°31′52″N 71°6′21″W
- Built: 1890
- Architect: Reading Water Co.
- MPS: Reading MRA
- NRHP reference No.: 85000549
- Added to NRHP: February 1, 1985

The Reading Standpipe was a historic water tower atop a hill near the corner of Auburn and Beacon Streets in Reading, Massachusetts. The 138-foot (42 m) tower was built in 1890-91 as part of Reading's first water supply system and was for many years a significant community landmark. The tower was built of steel and wrought iron in a style reminiscent of medieval fortifications.

The tower was added to the National Register of Historic Places in 1985. It was demolished in April 1999, leaving only its companion modern tower (erected in 1953), which itself was subsequently demolished and replaced with a communications tower.

== See also ==
- National Register of Historic Places listings in Reading, Massachusetts
- National Register of Historic Places listings in Middlesex County, Massachusetts
