= Lewis House (Reading, Massachusetts) =

Historic house in Massachusetts, United States

- U.S. National Register of Historic Places
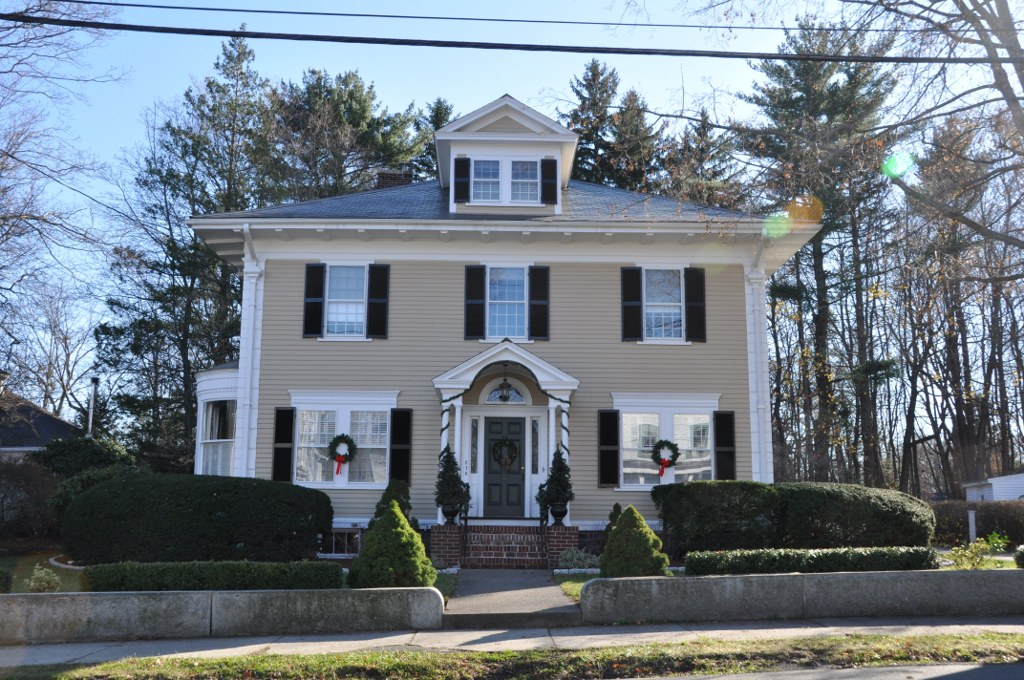

- Location within Massachusetts Location within the United States
- Location: 276 Woburn St., Reading, Massachusetts
- Coordinates: 42°31′8.26″N 71°7′4.81″W
- Built: 1875
- Architectural style: Colonial Revival
- MPS: Reading MRA
- NRHP reference No.: 84002741
- Added to NRHP: July 19, 1984

The Lewis House is a historic house at 276 Woburn Street in Reading, Massachusetts. The 2 1/2-story wood-frame house was built in the late 1870s by John Lewis, a successful shoe dealer. The house is three bays wide, with a hipped roof with a single gable dormer. The roof has extended eaves with false rafter ends that are actually lengthened modillion blocks; these features give the house a Colonial Revival feel. The corner boards are pilastered, and the front entry is flanked by half-length sidelight windows and topped by a pedimented lintel, above which is a round fanlight window.

The house was listed on the National Register of Historic Places in 1984.

== See also ==
- National Register of Historic Places listings in Reading, Massachusetts
- National Register of Historic Places listings in Middlesex County, Massachusetts
