= Francis Brooks House =

Historic house in Massachusetts, United States

- U.S. National Register of Historic Places
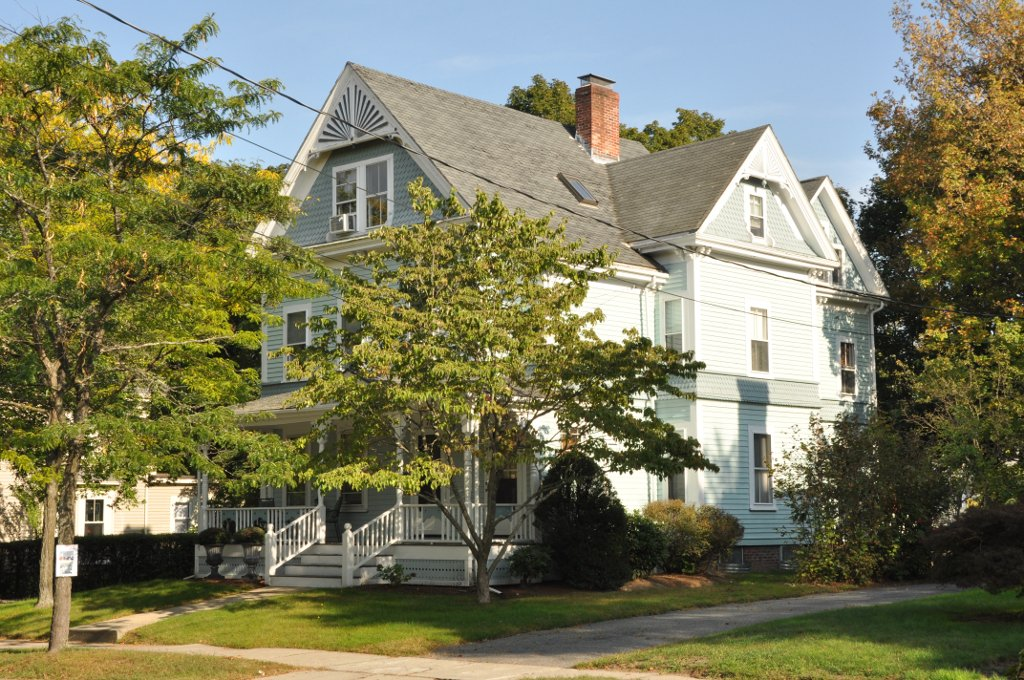

- Location within Massachusetts Location within the United States
- Location: 78–80 Prescott St., Reading, Massachusetts
- Coordinates: 42°31′10.02″N 71°6′42.95″W
- Area: less than one acre
- Built: 1887
- Architectural style: Stick/Eastlake, Queen Anne
- MPS: Reading MRA
- NRHP reference No.: 84002524
- Added to NRHP: July 19, 1984

The Francis Brooks House is a historic house in Reading, Massachusetts. Built in the late 1880s, it is one of Reading's finest examples of Queen Anne/Stick style Victorian architecture. It was listed on the National Register of Historic Places in 1984.

== Description and history ==
The Francis Brooks House stands in a large residential area southwest of downtown Reading, on the south side of Prescott Street between Pratt Street and Sunnyside Avenue. It is a 2 1/2-story wood-frame structure, with a front-facing gabled roof and clapboarded exterior. Its main facade is nominally three bays wide, although a fourth bay is created by side projection that the porch wraps around to meet; it is a product of the house's conversion to a duplex. There are entranceways in the two right bays and windows in those on the left. The porch has bracketed turned posts in the Victorian style, and a hip roof. The second floor has three windows, and the cornice below the gable is adorned with paired brackets. The gable is filled by a pair of sash windows, and there is an elaborate Stick style sunburst pattern of woodwork at the gable peak. Similar patterned woodwork is found on the small gable over the porch stairs, and in side-facing gables.

The land on which this house was built was farmland owned by the locally prominent Prescott family, and was platted for subdivision in the 1880s. It was built sometime before 1889 by Francis E. Brooks, a local entrepreneur involved in a range of businesses. Brooks was, among other business pursuits, owner of the Hill Brush Company, a producer of "magnetic" hair brushes, a wood engraver, and bicycle salesman.

== See also ==
- National Register of Historic Places listings in Reading, Massachusetts
- National Register of Historic Places listings in Middlesex County, Massachusetts
