= Reading Municipal Light and Power Station =

- U.S. National Register of Historic Places
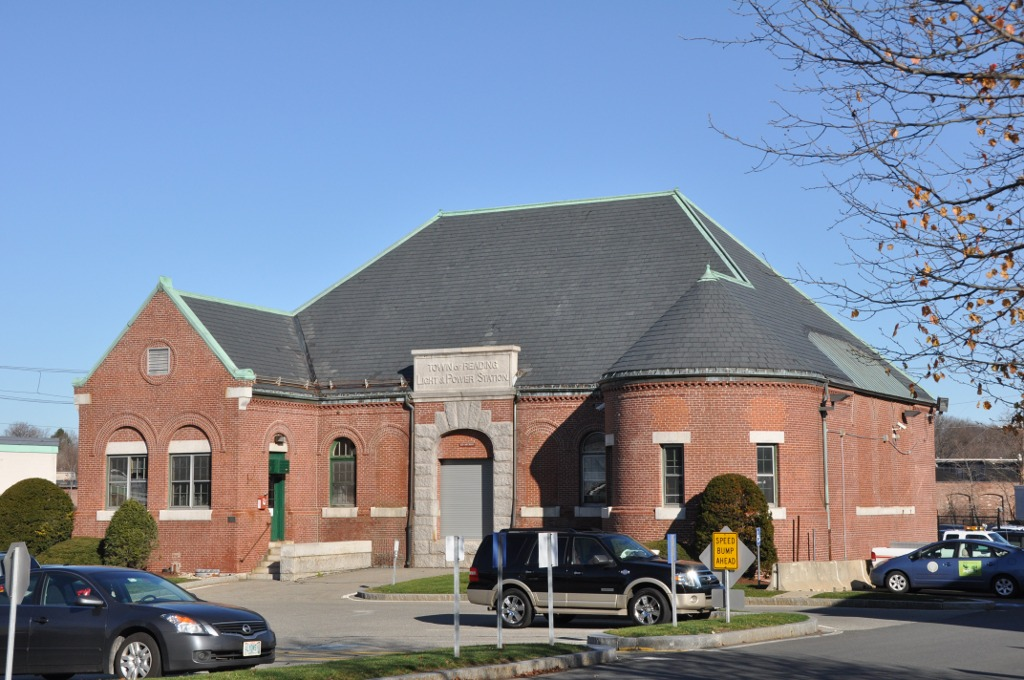

- Location within Massachusetts Location within the United States
- Location: Reading, Massachusetts
- Coordinates: 42°31′5.6″N 71°6′3.5″W
- Built: 1894
- Architect: Abbott, George E.
- Architectural style: Romanesque
- MPS: Reading MRA
- NRHP reference No.: 84002811
- Added to NRHP: July 19, 1984

The Reading Municipal Light and Power Station is a historic municipal power station building at 226 Ash Street in Reading, Massachusetts. The single-story brick building was built in 1894 after the town decided to build a municipal power station. The Romanesque style building was designed by George E. Abbott, and housed power generating equipment until 1925, when it was converted to housing power switching equipment. It now houses municipal offices.

The building was added to the National Register of Historic Places in 1984.

== See also ==
- National Register of Historic Places listings in Reading, Massachusetts
- National Register of Historic Places listings in Middlesex County, Massachusetts
