= House at 79–81 Salem Street =

Historic house in Massachusetts, United States

- U.S. National Register of Historic Places
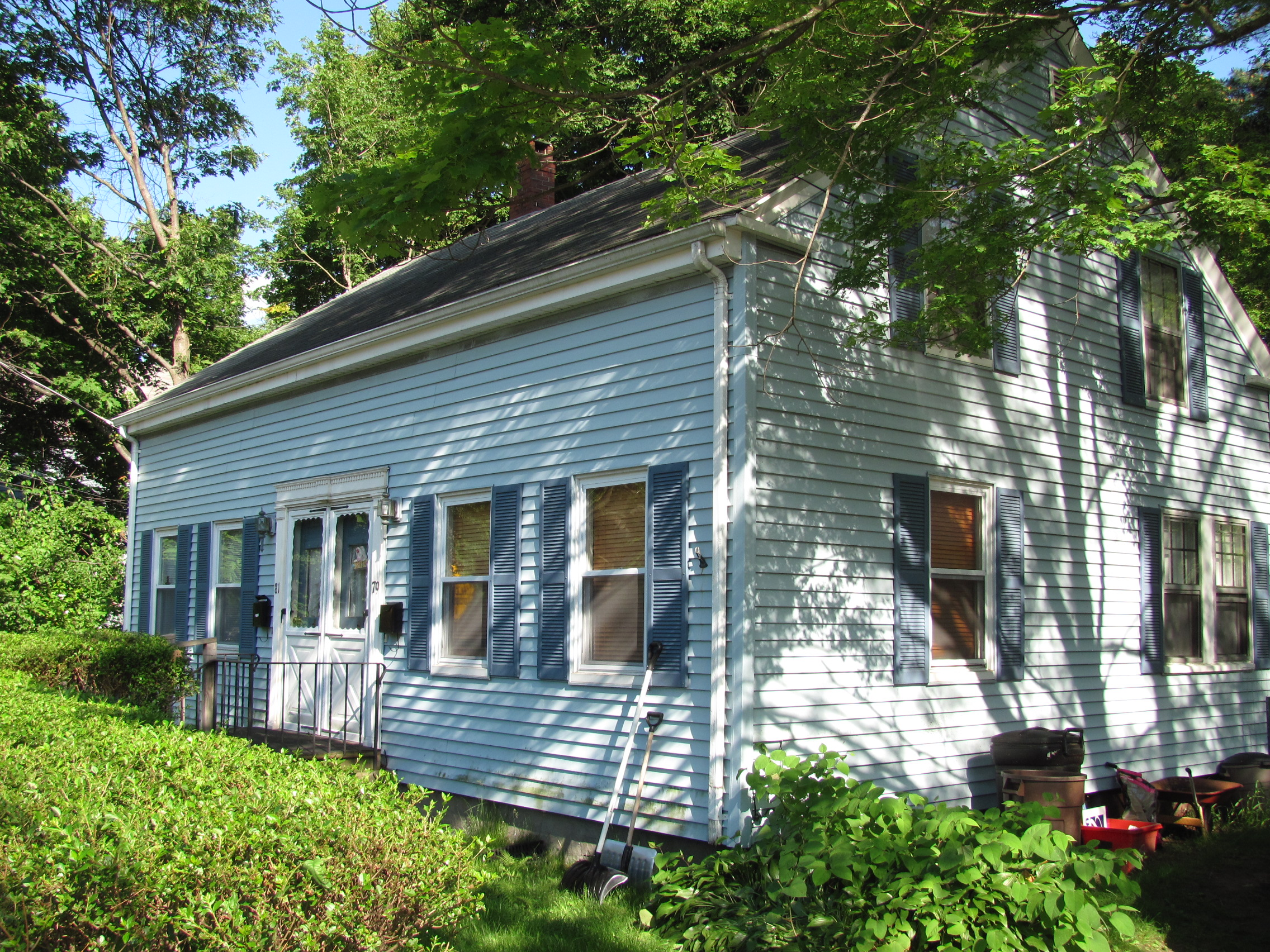
- House at 79–81 Salem Street

- Location within Massachusetts Location within the United States
- Location: 79–81 Salem Street, Reading, Massachusetts
- Coordinates: 42°31′35″N 71°5′56″W
- Built: 1845
- Architectural style: Greek Revival, Federal
- MPS: Reading MRA
- NRHP reference No.: 84002676
- Added to NRHP: July 19, 1984

The House at 79–81 Salem Street, also known as the Samuel Allen House, in Reading, Massachusetts was a modest Greek Revival two-family cottage. The wood-frame house was built sometime between 1830 and 1854 was a typical vernacular Greek Revival house, with a five-bay facade and a paired central entrance. When the house was listed on the National Register of Historic Places in 1984, the two entrances were flanked by pilasters supporting an unusually tall entablature; the house was later covered in synthetic siding, and a projecting portion at the top of the entablature was removed. The structure was completely torn down in 2021 for new construction.

== See also ==
- National Register of Historic Places listings in Reading, Massachusetts
- National Register of Historic Places listings in Middlesex County, Massachusetts
