= House at 16 Mineral Street =

Historic house in Massachusetts, United States

- U.S. National Register of Historic Places
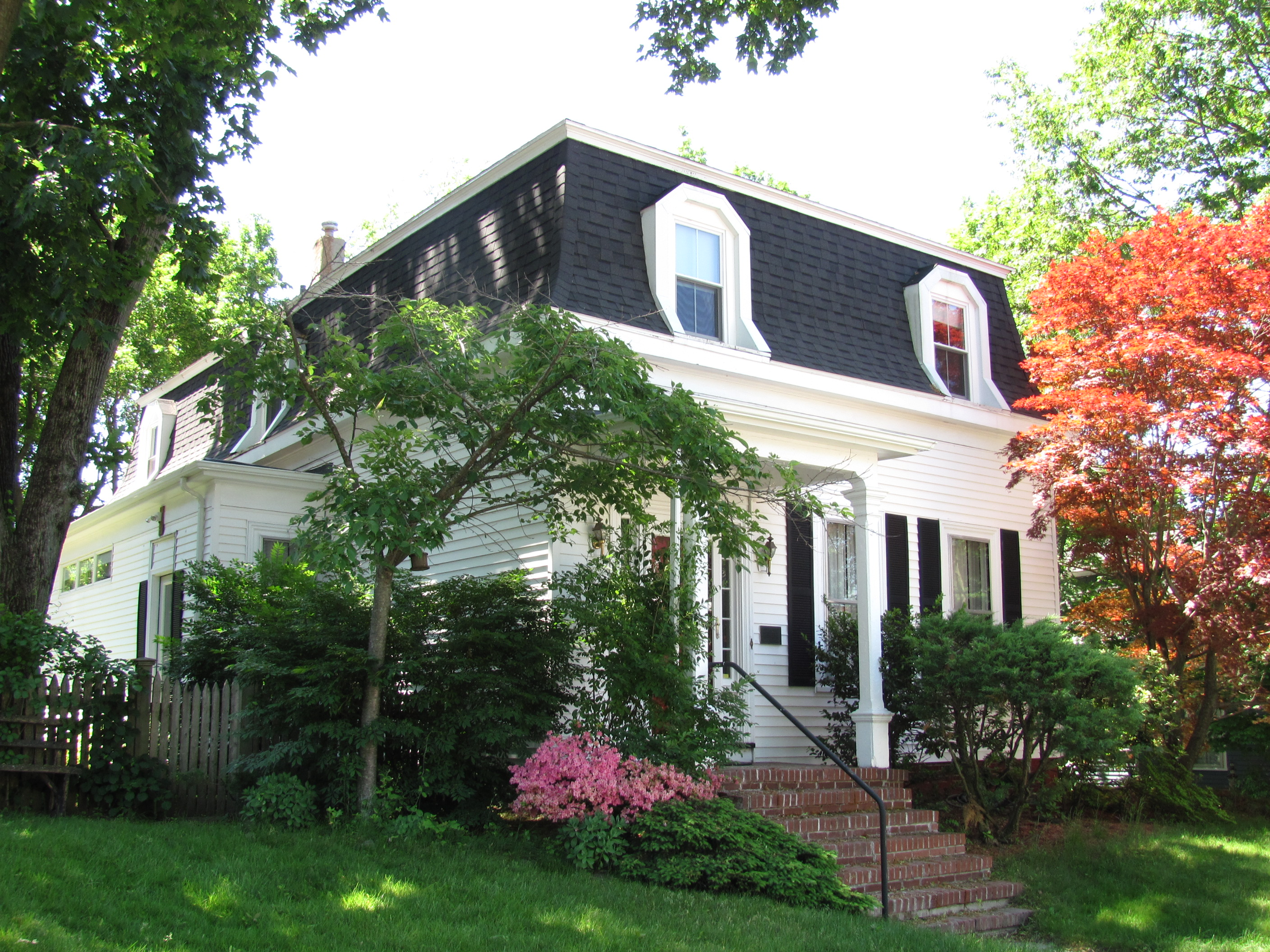

- Location within Massachusetts Location within the United States
- Location: 16 Mineral St., Reading, Massachusetts
- Coordinates: 42°31′33″N 71°6′53″W
- Built: 1873
- Architect: Bancroft & Temple
- Architectural style: Second Empire
- MPS: Reading MRA
- NRHP reference No.: 84002677
- Added to NRHP: July 19, 1984

16 Mineral Street in Reading, Massachusetts is a well-preserved Second Empire cottage. It was built c. 1874 and probably moved to its present location not long afterward, during a building boom in that part of the town. It was listed on the National Register of Historic Places in 1984.

== Description and history ==
Mineral Street is located in a residential area west of downtown Reading, running roughly east–west between High and Prospect Streets. It is named for a failed business venture to develop a nearby spring commercially. Number 16 is located near its eastern end, on the south side between High and Vine Streets. It is a 1 1/2-story wood-frame structure, with a mansard roof providing a full second story. The steep part of the roof is pierced by gable dormers with octagonal hood moldings. It is three bays wide, with its front entry in the leftmost bay. The front entry porch is Italianate in style, with square chamfered columns. A polygonal bay projects from one of the bays on the right side of the main block. The house is enlarged by extensions to the rear.

The house was built in the early 1870s, when this part of Reading was undergoing a housing boom. The Boston and Maine Railroad, which Mineral Street crosses west of this house, was built through the area in 1870, and set off a building boom of housing for workers who commuted to Boston by rail. It may have been built by Timothy Temple, a builder active in the area at the time.

== See also ==
- National Register of Historic Places listings in Reading, Massachusetts
- National Register of Historic Places listings in Middlesex County, Massachusetts
