= Battell House =

Historic house in Massachusetts, United States

- U.S. National Register of Historic Places
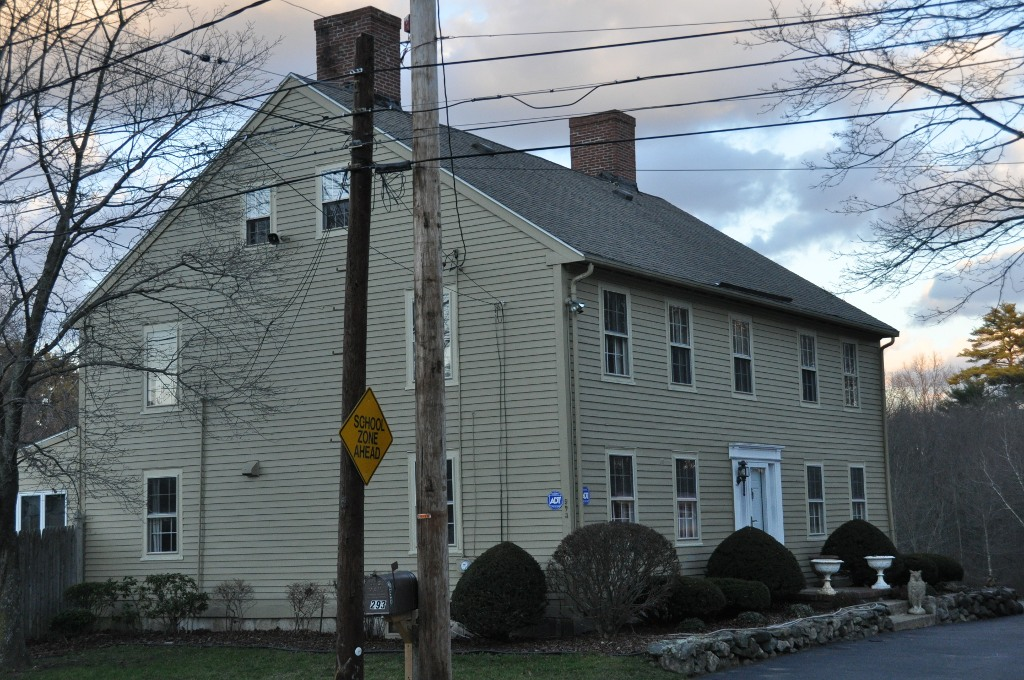

- Location within Massachusetts Location within the United States
- Location: 293 Haverhill St., Reading, Massachusetts
- Coordinates: 42°32′21″N 71°5′18″W
- Area: 6 acres (2.4 ha)
- Built: 1806
- Architectural style: Federal
- MPS: Reading MRA
- NRHP reference No.: 84002504
- Added to NRHP: July 19, 1984

The Battell House is a historic house located at 293 Haverhill Street in Reading, Massachusetts. Built about 1806, it is a fine local example of transitional Georgian-Federal architecture. It is notable as the home of Charles Battell, a veteran of the American Civil War. It was listed on the National Register of Historic Places in 1984.

== Description and history ==
The Battell House is located in eastern Reading, on the east side of Haverhill Street a short way north of its junction with Wakefield Street. Haverhill Street is a historically old road, once the main road between Salem and Haverhill, and is now a local secondary road. The house is oriented facing south, presenting a gabled side facade to the street. It is 2 1/2 stories in height, with a gabled roof, two interior chimneys, clapboarded exterior, and stone foundation. The main facade is five bays wide, with a center entry framed by sidelight windows and pilasters, and topped by a reproduction entablature. The upper floor windows butt against the eaves, and the gable ends lack returns, both conservative Georgian features.

The house was built about 1806, in an area traditionally called "Pratt Row" for the large number of that family who settled the area. This house was built on land originally belonging to the Symonds family, which came into the Battell family by marriage. Its best-known occupant was Charles P. Battell, an American Civil War veteran who lost a leg during the Siege of Petersburg.

== See also ==
- National Register of Historic Places listings in Reading, Massachusetts
- National Register of Historic Places listings in Middlesex County, Massachusetts
