= Jerry Nichols Tavern =

- U.S. National Register of Historic Places
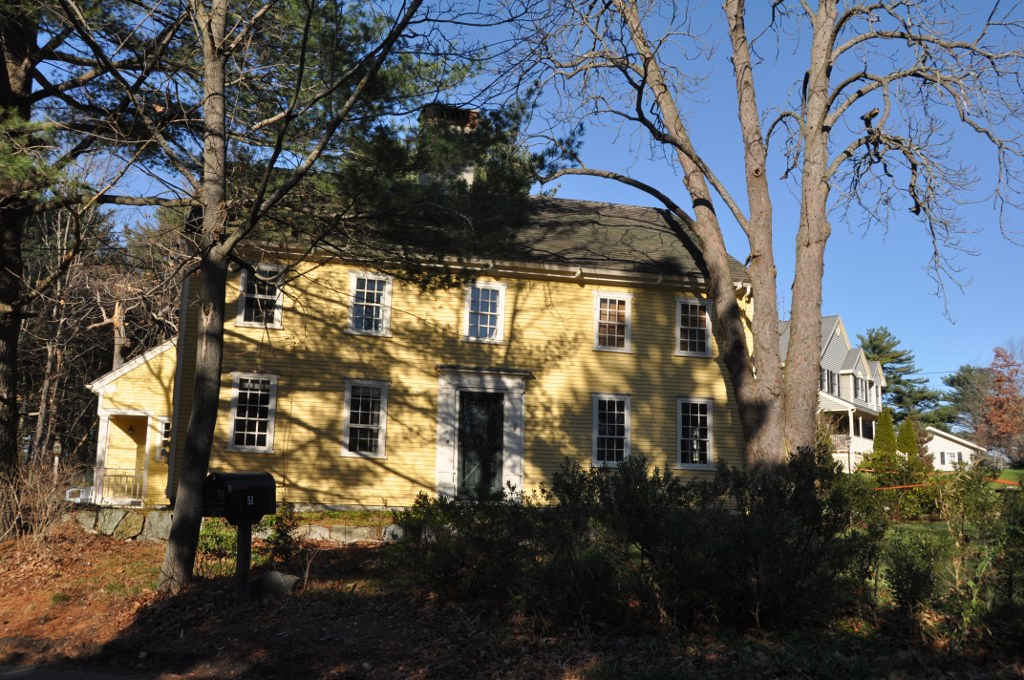

- Location within Massachusetts Location within the United States
- Location: 51 Mill Street, Reading, Massachusetts
- Coordinates: 42°33′37.09″N 71°6′28.58″W
- Built: 1785
- Architectural style: Georgian
- MPS: Reading MRA
- NRHP reference No.: 84002757
- Added to NRHP: July 19, 1984

The Jerry Nichols Tavern is a historic house in Reading, Massachusetts. It is a 2 1/2-storey wood-frame structure, five bays wide, with a side gable roof, central chimney, and clapboard siding. The main entrance is flanked by pilasters and topped by an entablature. The oldest portion of the house was built in 1785 by Jeremiah Nichols, a Revolutionary War veteran, farmer, and shoemaker. This property was where Reading's minute companies drilled prior to the American Revolutionary War, and where its powder magazine was kept. The building was expanded 1810–13, and had by 1830 been adapted as a tavern and stage coach stop. In 1824 it was bought by Rev. Peter Sanborn, in whose family it remained into the 1940s.

The house was listed on the National Register of Historic Places in 1984.

== See also ==
- National Register of Historic Places listings in Reading, Massachusetts
- National Register of Historic Places listings in Middlesex County, Massachusetts
