= Timothy Hartshorn House =

Historic house in Massachusetts, United States

- U.S. National Register of Historic Places
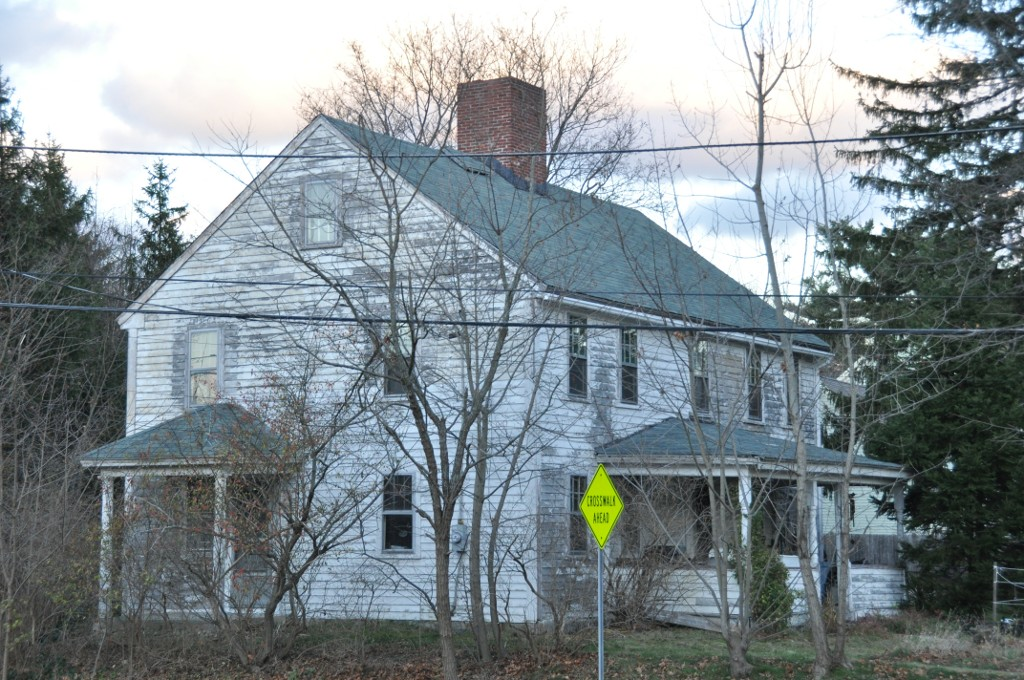

- Location within Massachusetts Location within the United States
- Location: 379 Haverhill Street, Reading, Massachusetts
- Coordinates: 42°32′35″N 71°5′22″W
- Built: 1787
- Architectural style: Federal
- MPS: Reading MRA
- NRHP reference No.: 84002633
- Added to NRHP: July 19, 1984

The Timothy Hartshorn House is a historic house in Reading, Massachusetts. This 2 1/2-story wood-frame house was built c. 1787 by Timothy Hartshorn, a farmer and shoemaker, and remained in his family for over 100 years. It is a vernacular Georgian-Federal style, with five bays and a central chimney. The main entrance is flanked by sidelight windows and fluted pilasters, supporting an entablature with high capitals, but is somewhat obscured by the 19th century porch.

The house was listed on the National Register of Historic Places in 1984.

== See also ==
- National Register of Historic Places listings in Reading, Massachusetts
- National Register of Historic Places listings in Middlesex County, Massachusetts
