= Stillman Pratt House =

Historic house in Massachusetts, United States

- U.S. National Register of Historic Places
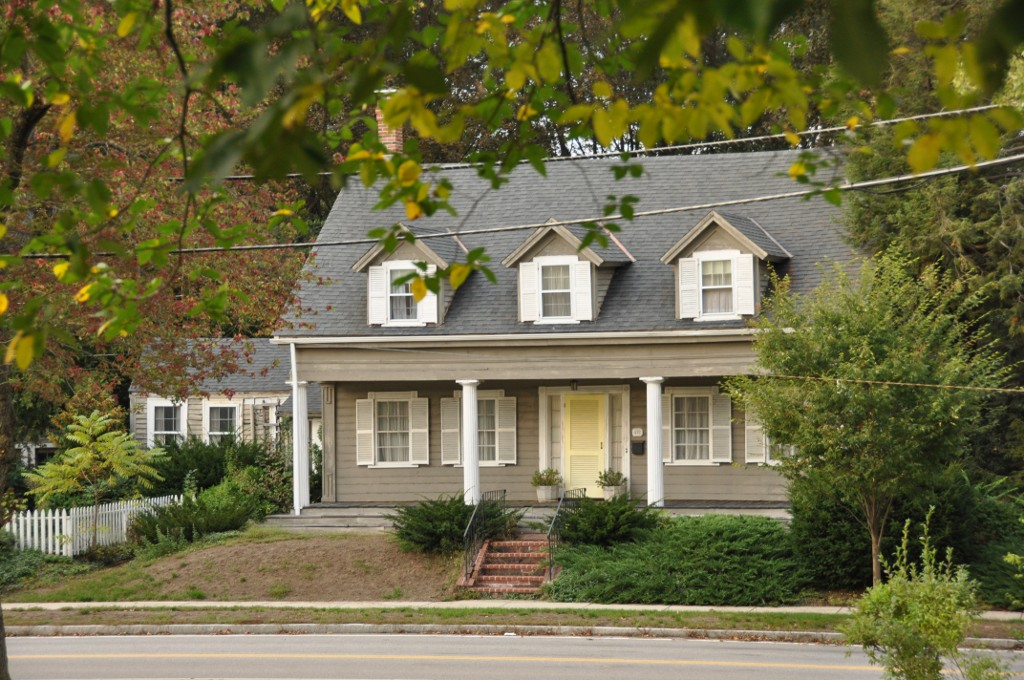

- Location within Massachusetts Location within the United States
- Location: Reading, Massachusetts
- Coordinates: 42°30′40″N 71°6′22″W
- Built: 1840
- Architectural style: Greek Revival
- MPS: Reading MRA
- NRHP reference No.: 84002799
- Added to NRHP: July 19, 1984

The Stillman Pratt House is a historic house at 472 Summer Avenue in Reading, Massachusetts. The 1 1/2-story wood-frame house, probably built in the late 1840s, is a rare local variant of a combined Federal-Greek Revival style house. It follows the Federal style of placing the roof gables at the sides, but its roof extends over the front porch, which is supported by four fluted Doric columns. The house's corner pilasters are decorated with the Greek key motif, and its windows and doors have architrave surrounds with corner blocks.

The house was listed on the National Register of Historic Places in 1984.

== See also ==
- National Register of Historic Places listings in Reading, Massachusetts
- National Register of Historic Places listings in Middlesex County, Massachusetts
