= House at 322 Haven Street =

Historic house in Massachusetts, United States

- U.S. National Register of Historic Places
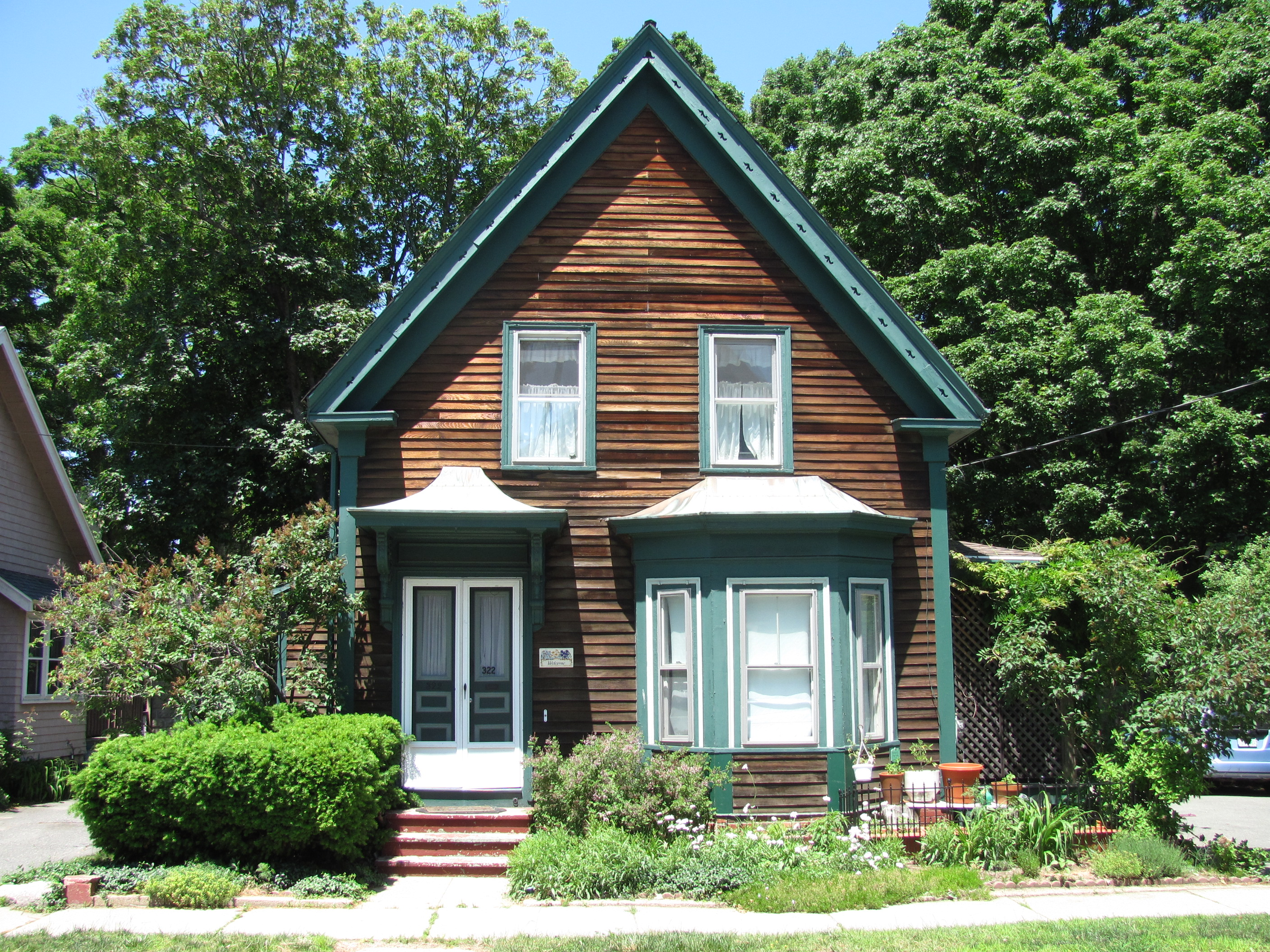
- House at 322 Haven Street

- Location within Massachusetts Location within the United States
- Location: 322 Haven St., Reading, Massachusetts
- Coordinates: 42°31′24″N 71°6′5″W
- Area: less than one acre
- Built: 1876
- Architectural style: Italianate, Gothic Revival
- MPS: Reading MRA
- NRHP reference No.: 84002686
- Added to NRHP: July 19, 1984

322 Haven Street in Reading, Massachusetts is well preserved cottage with Gothic and Italianate features. Built sometime before 1889, its use of even modest Gothic features is unusual in Reading, where the Gothic Revival was not particularly popular. The house was listed on the National Register of Historic Places in 1984.

== Description and history ==
The house at 322 Haven Street is located in a residential area just east of downtown Reading, on the north side of Haven Street between Elliott and Village Streets. It is a small 1 1/2-story wood-frame structure, with a front-facing gabled roof, clapboarded exterior, and brick foundation. It has cornices and pilasters that are reminiscent of Greek Revival styling, but the door hood is distinctly Italianate in style, and there is Gothic bargeboard decoration in the front gable. To the right of the entrance is a polygonal bay window topped by a flared hip roof, similar to the one on the small porch sheltering the entrance.

The house was built sometime between 1876 and 1889, based on analysis of maps of the area from that time. It is unusual in the town for exhibiting any Gothic features at all, because the Gothic Revival was not very popular in Reading; this is one of the town's few surviving examples. At the time of its construction, Haven Street was a private way passing through a lumber yard. It was accepted as a town road by 1912.

== See also ==
- National Register of Historic Places listings in Reading, Massachusetts
- National Register of Historic Places listings in Middlesex County, Massachusetts
