= Harnden–Browne House =

Historic house in Massachusetts, United States

- U.S. National Register of Historic Places
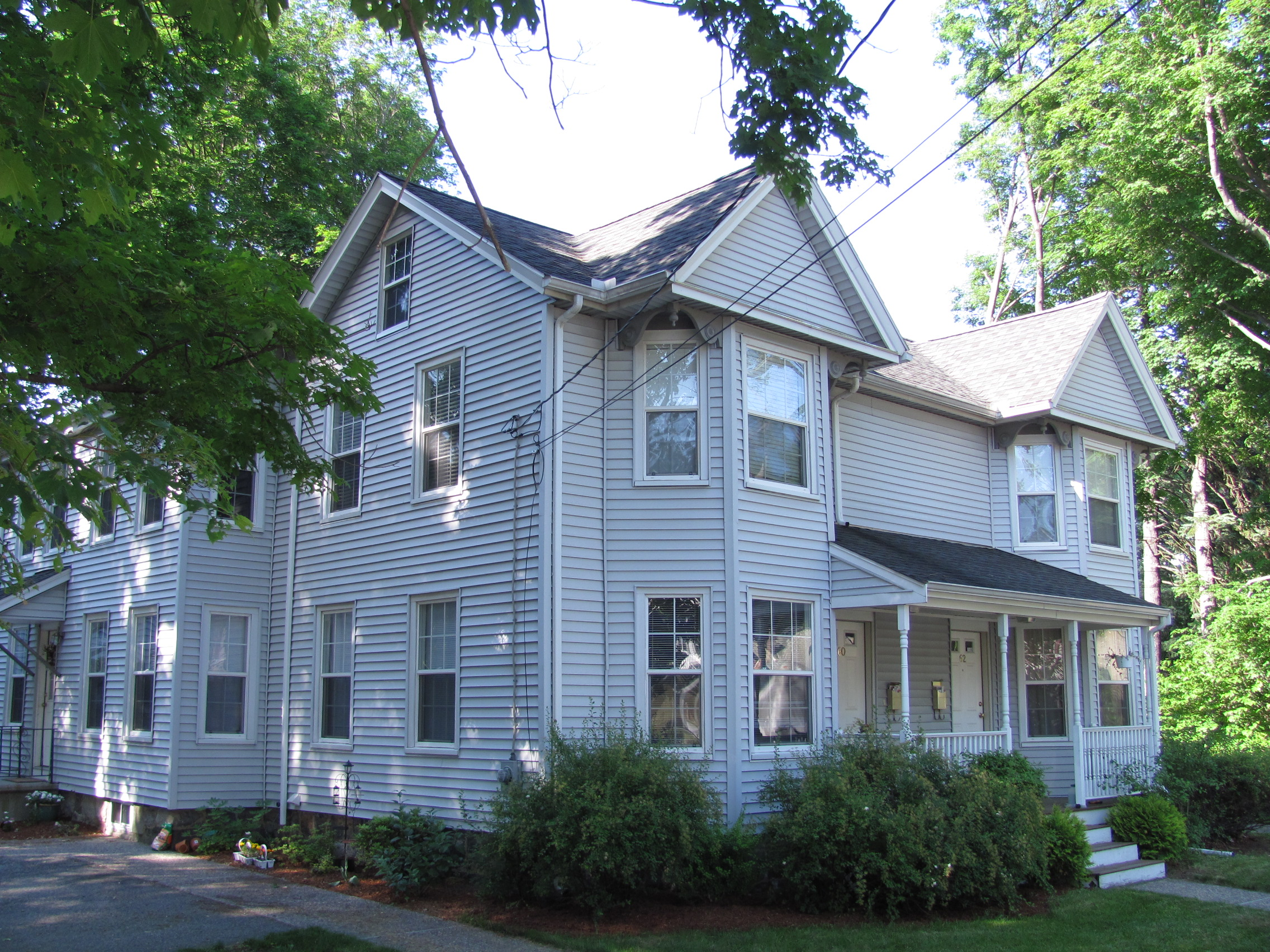
- Harnden–Browne House

- Location within Massachusetts Location within the United States
- Location: Reading, Massachusetts
- Coordinates: 42°31′35.64″N 71°5′58.69″W
- Built: 1831
- MPS: Reading MRA
- NRHP reference No.: 85000498
- Added to NRHP: February 1, 1985

The Harnden–Browne House is a historic house at 60-62 Salem Street in Reading, Massachusetts, exemplifying the adaptation of older buildings to new architectural styles. The 2 1/2-story wood-frame house was built in 1831 by Sylvester Harnden, likely in a Georgian-Federal vernacular style. Later in the 19th century it was restyled with some Queen Anne details, and converted to a boarding house. In 1928 it was owned by Thomas Browne, an Irish immigrant who first roomed in the house.

The house was listed on the National Register of Historic Places in 1985.

== See also ==
- National Register of Historic Places listings in Reading, Massachusetts
- National Register of Historic Places listings in Middlesex County, Massachusetts
