= Benjamin Beard House =

Historic house in Massachusetts, United States

- U.S. National Register of Historic Places
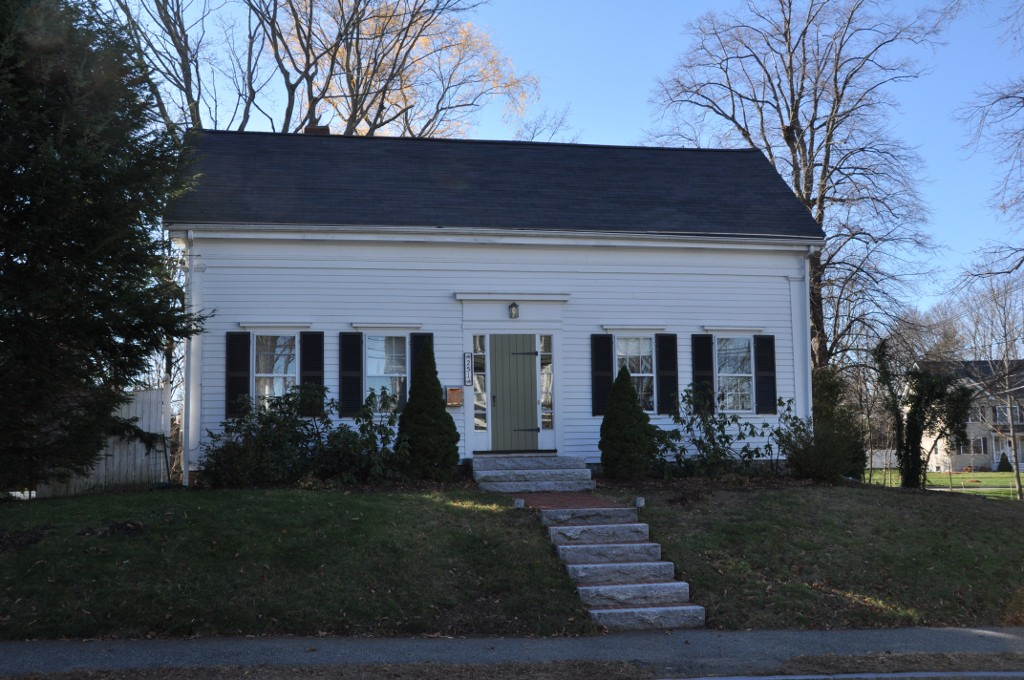

- Location within Massachusetts Location within the United States
- Location: 251 Ash St., Reading, Massachusetts
- Coordinates: 42°31′0.4″N 71°6′3.01″W
- Built: 1854
- Architectural style: Greek Revival
- MPS: Reading MRA
- NRHP reference No.: 84002505
- Added to NRHP: July 19, 1984

The Benjamin Beard House is a historic house in Reading, Massachusetts. Built in the early 1850s, it is a well-preserved example of a distinctive local variant of Greek Revival architecture. It was listed on the National Register of Historic Places in 1984.

== Description and history ==
The Benjamin Beard House stands south of downtown Reading, at the southwest corner of Ash Street and Avon Street. The house is a 1 1/2-story wood-frame structure, with a side-gable roof, single off-center interior chimney, and clapboarded exterior. It is laid out in what was a fairly common local variant, with the long spine of the house parallel to the street, and set on a slightly raised mound. There are pilasters on the corners, and the front entry has a somewhat tall Federal style high entablature, with sidelight windows and plain side molding supporting a corniced entablature. A single-story ell extends to the rear of the main block.

The house was probably built in the early 1850s. Benjamin Beard, its first owner, was the town's first jeweler, opening a store in 1847 after having previously worked for a local clock- and watchmaker. Beard's son William also continued the profession.

== See also ==
- National Register of Historic Places listings in Reading, Massachusetts
- National Register of Historic Places listings in Middlesex County, Massachusetts
