= Roberts House (Reading, Massachusetts) =

Historic house in Massachusetts, United States

- U.S. National Register of Historic Places
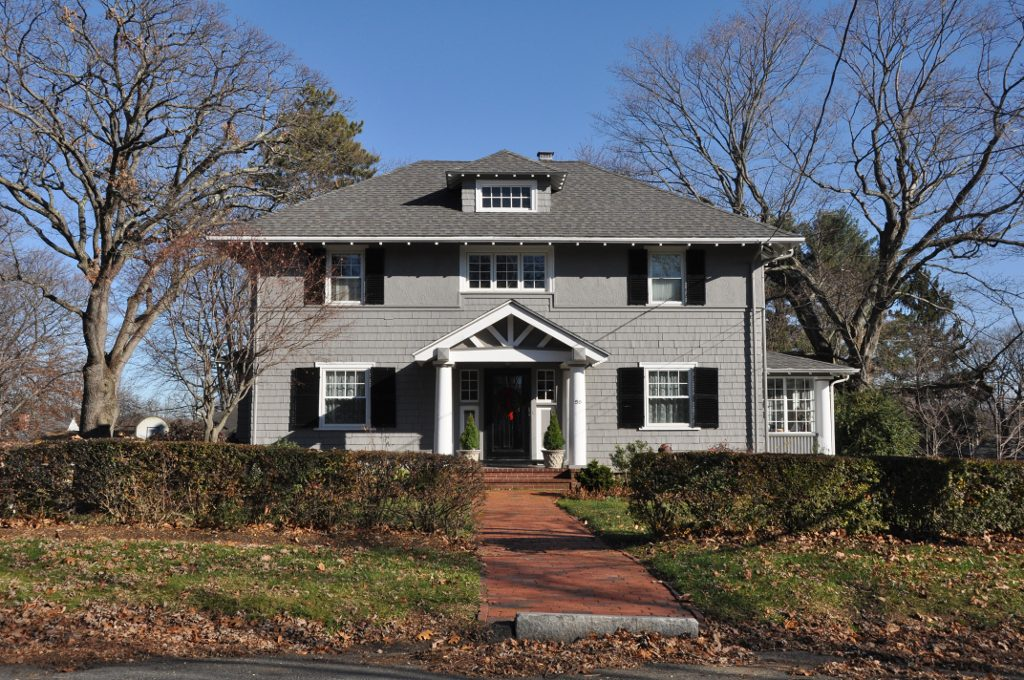

- Location within Massachusetts Location within the United States
- Location: Reading, Massachusetts
- Coordinates: 42°31′20.44″N 71°7′7.9″W
- Built: 1911
- Architectural style: Colonial Revival, Bungalow/Craftsman
- MPS: Reading MRA
- NRHP reference No.: 84002815
- Added to NRHP: July 19, 1984

The Roberts House is a historic house at 59 Prospect Street in Reading, Massachusetts. The two-story house is basically Colonial Revival in character, but also exhibits Craftsman style features, including extended eaves with exposed rafter ends, stucco walls, and a chunky entrance portico. The window above the entrance is a Shingle style band of three casement windows, and there is a hip-roof dormer in the roof above. The house is one of Reading's better examples of Craftsman architecture, and was built in 1911, during a building boom on the town's west side.

The house was listed on the National Register of Historic Places in 1984.

== See also ==
- National Register of Historic Places listings in Reading, Massachusetts
- National Register of Historic Places listings in Middlesex County, Massachusetts
