= Wendell Bancroft House =

Historic house in Massachusetts, United States

- U.S. National Register of Historic Places
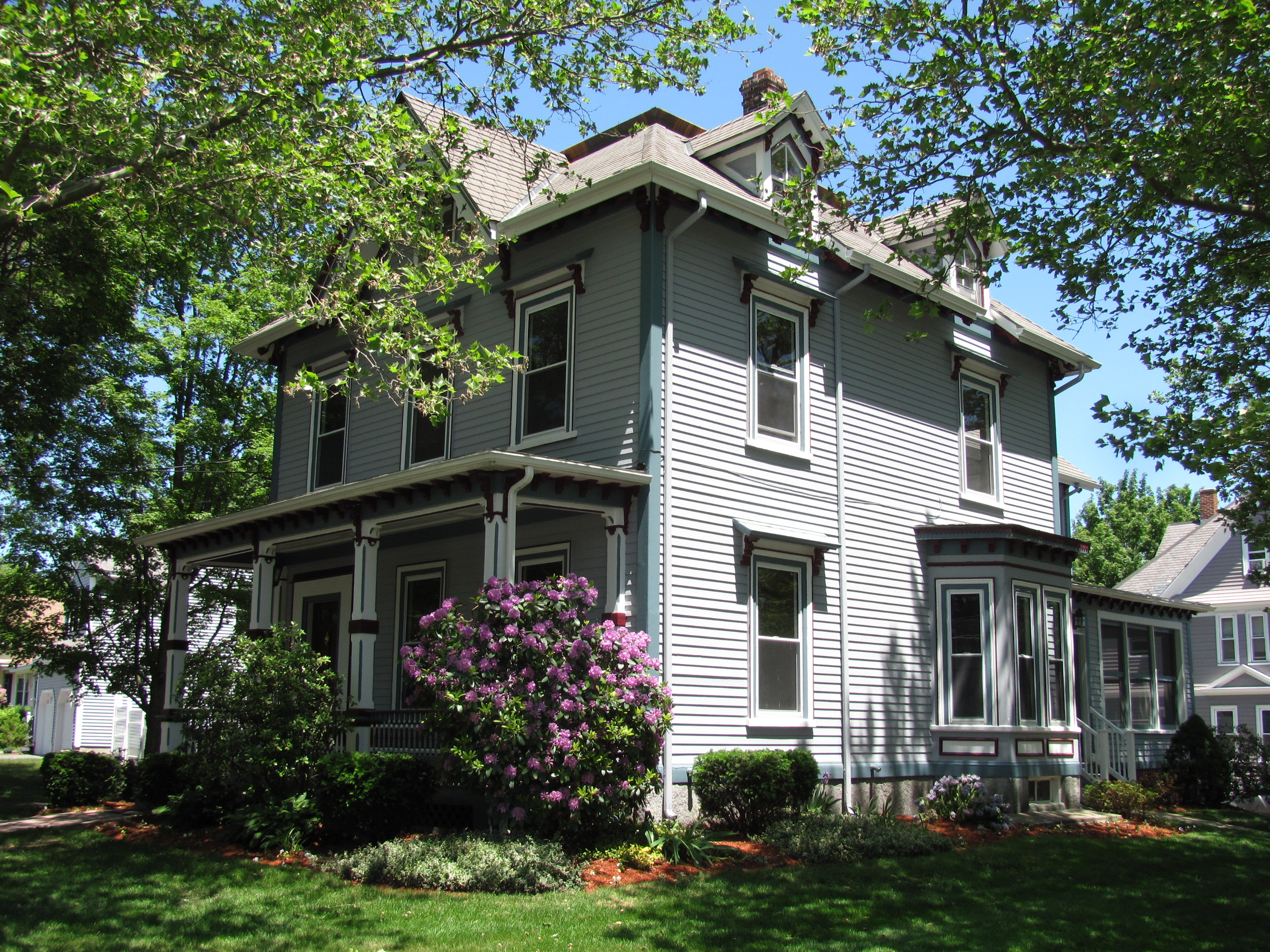
- Wendell Bancroft House

- Location within Massachusetts Location within the United States
- Location: 20 Washington St., Reading, Massachusetts
- Coordinates: 42°31′20″N 71°6′39″W
- Built: 1867
- Architectural style: Gothic Revival
- MPS: Reading MRA
- NRHP reference No.: 84002477
- Added to NRHP: July 19, 1984

The Wendell Bancroft House is a historic house in Reading, Massachusetts. Built in the late 1860s, it is one of the town's few surviving examples of residential Gothic Revival architecture, built for one of its leading businessmen of the period. The house was listed on the National Register of Historic Places in 1984.

== Description and history ==
The Wendell Bancroft House stands in a suburban residential neighborhood west of central Reading, at the northeastern corner of Washington and Woburn Streets. It is a 2 1/2-story wood-frame house, with a hip roof and clapboarded exterior. The roof has cross-gable dormers with steeply pitched roofs and decorative bargeboard trim, and the south facade has Gothic lancet windows. Windows are topped by small shedroof hoods supported by decorative brackets; the latter also appear on the main roof eave, the porch roof eave, and the eave of a bay window on the south side. The front porch has a hip roof supported by chamfered posts, and a turned spindle balustrade.

The house was built in the late 1860s, and is one of the few Gothic Revival houses in the town. It was built by Wendell Bancroft, a prominent local businessman and banker. He owned a coal and lumber yard, was a founding president of the First National Bank of Reading and Reading Co-operative Bank, and a founding officer of Mechanics Savings Bank.

== See also ==
- National Register of Historic Places listings in Reading, Massachusetts
- National Register of Historic Places listings in Middlesex County, Massachusetts
