= Edwin Bassett House =

Historic house in Massachusetts, United States

- U.S. National Register of Historic Places
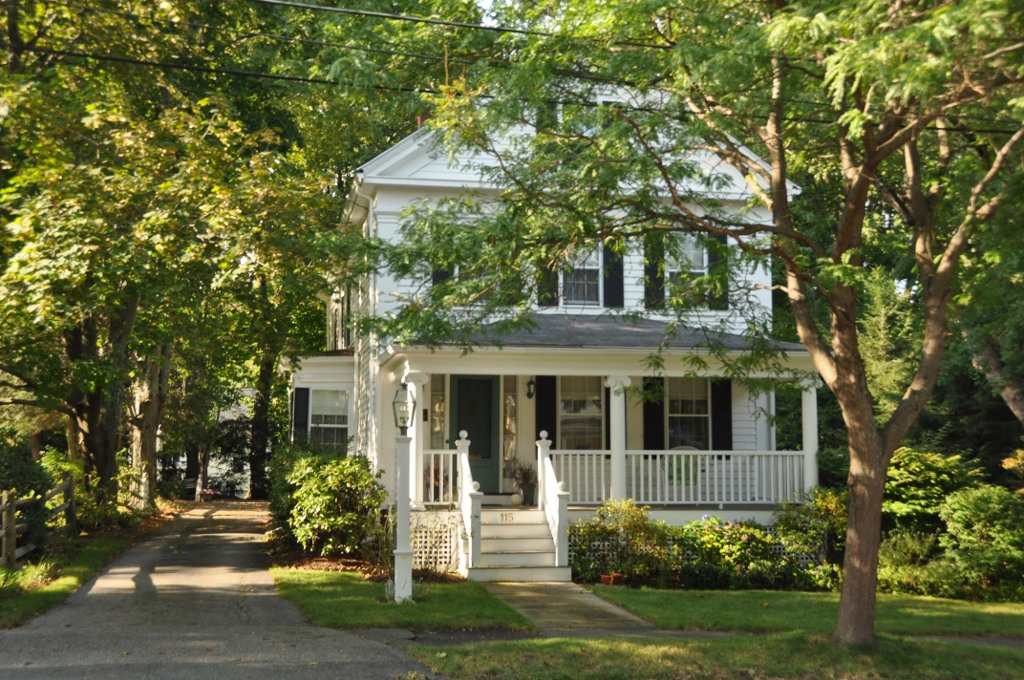

- Location within Massachusetts Location within the United States
- Location: 115 Prescott Street, Reading, Massachusetts
- Coordinates: 42°31′7.57″N 71°6′51.83″W
- Built: 1850
- Architectural style: Greek Revival
- MPS: Reading MRA
- NRHP reference No.: 84002482
- Added to NRHP: July 19, 1984

The Edwin Bassett House is a historic house in Reading, Massachusetts. It is a well-preserved Greek Revival house, built in 1850 by Edwin Bassett, the first Reading shoemaker to install a McKay stitching machine, a device that revolutionized and led to the industrialization of what was before that a cottage industry. The house was listed on the National Register of Historic Places in 1984.

== Description and history ==
The Bassett House is set on the north side of Prescott Street, a residential through street to the west of Reading's central business district. Facing south, it is a 2 1/2-story wood-frame structure, three bays wide, with a front-gable roof and clapboard siding. Its Greek Revival features include corner pilasters and a wide frieze that encircles the house, and a fully pedimented gable, which is not usually found on period houses in Reading. A single-story hip-roofed porch extends across the front facade, supported by Doric columns. The house follows a typical side hall plan; its entry is flanked by flat pilasters.

Prescott Street was laid out in 1845 on what had previously been farmland. This house was built in 1850 by Edwin Bassett, a maker of shoes for children and infants, a common product for local shoemakers in what was then a cottage industry. Bassett was the first in Reading to install a McKay stitching machine, significantly improving the process by which shoes were made. The machine had a revolutionizing effect in Reading, where the process of shoemaking would become increasingly industrialized.

== See also ==
- National Register of Historic Places listings in Reading, Massachusetts
- National Register of Historic Places listings in Middlesex County, Massachusetts
