= Jacob Manning House =

Historic house in Massachusetts, United States

- U.S. National Register of Historic Places
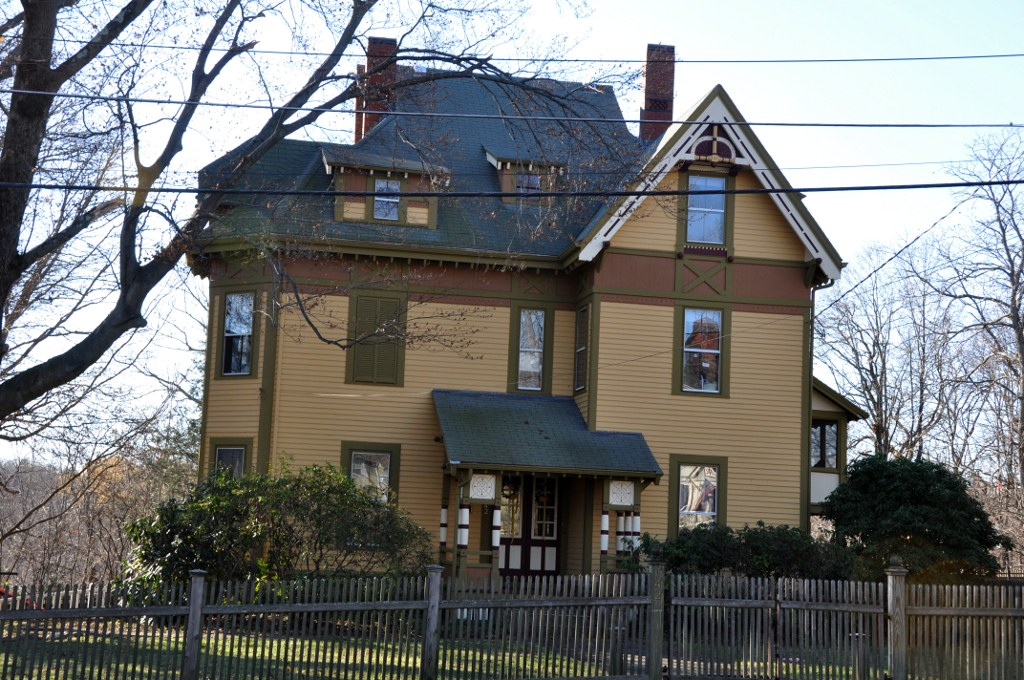

- Location within Massachusetts Location within the United States
- Location: 140 High Street, Reading, Massachusetts
- Coordinates: 42°31′29.66″N 71°6′44.26″W
- Built: 1877
- Architectural style: Stick/Eastlake
- MPS: Reading MRA
- NRHP reference No.: 84002745
- Added to NRHP: July 19, 1984

The Jacob Manning House is a historic house in Reading, Massachusetts. Built in 1877 for garden nursery owner Jacob Manning, this 2 1/2-story wood-frame house is an excellent local example of Stick style architecture. It has a steeply pitched roof, multiple gables, tall thin windows, and decorative half-timber woodwork. The owner, Jacob Manning, owned one of the largest nurseries in the area, and was responsible for the landscaping of the Massachusetts pavilion at the 1893 Chicago World Fair.

The house was listed on the National Register of Historic Places in 1984.

== See also ==
- National Register of Historic Places listings in Reading, Massachusetts
- National Register of Historic Places listings in Middlesex County, Massachusetts
