= House at 26 Center Avenue =

Historic house in Massachusetts, United States

- U.S. National Register of Historic Places
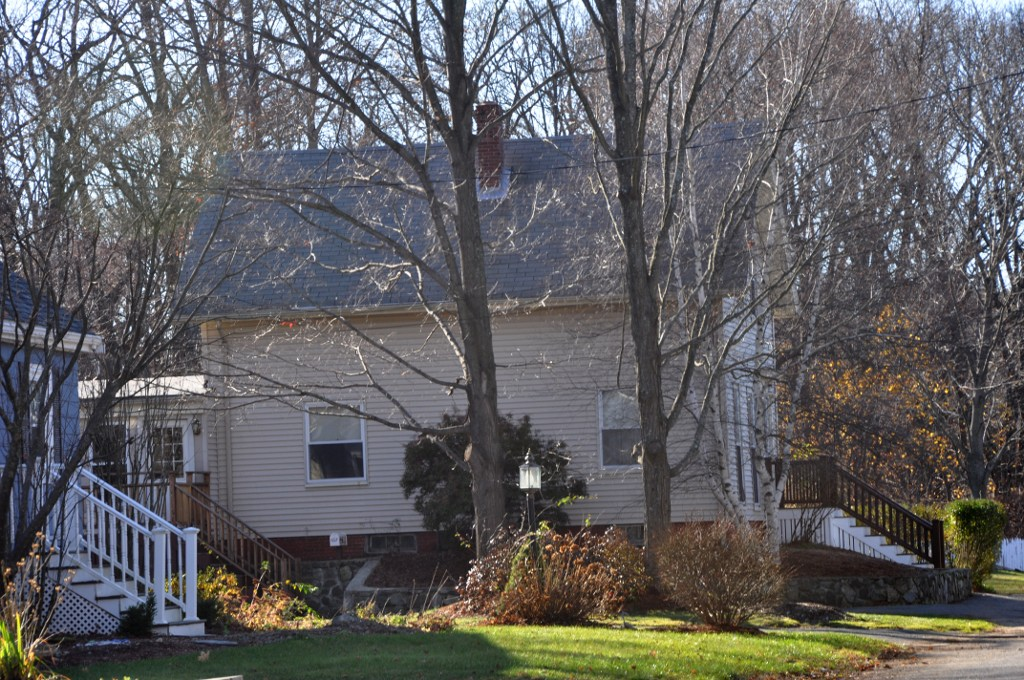

- Location within Massachusetts Location within the United States
- Location: 26 Center Ave., Reading, Massachusetts
- Coordinates: 42°31′5″N 71°6′25″W
- Area: less than one acre
- Built: 1870
- Architectural style: Italianate, Gothic Revival
- MPS: Reading MRA
- NRHP reference No.: 84002679
- Added to NRHP: July 19, 1984

26 Center Avenue in Reading, Massachusetts is an architecturally eclectic cottage, with a mix of Greek Revival, Gothic Revival, and Italianate features. Built c. 1854–1875, it is a rare surviving remnant of a residential subdivision once dubbed "Mudville" for the condition of its unpaved roads. The house was listed on the National Register of Historic Places in 1984.

== Description and history ==
The house at 26 Center Avenue is located in a residential area southwest of downtown Reading, on the south side of Center Street near its junction with Maple Avenue. It is 1 1/2 stories in height, of wood-frame construction, and resting on a brick foundation set on an artificially raised mound. This latter feature was one commonly used during Reading's real estate development during the Greek Revival period. Its front facade is three bays wide, with the main entrance in the rightmost bay, framed by sidelight windows, pilasters, and a corniced entablature. Survey photos of the building in 1980 show jigsawn vergeboard on the front gable and side eaves, a Gothic feature, and bracketed and corniced surrounds on the front windows; these features have either been removed or covered over.

Based on stylistic analysis, the house was built sometime between about 1854 and 1875 as worker housing. It was part of a residential subdivision created by developer Amos Cummings in 1854. Cummings loaned workers money with which they could build houses, and then collected rent or other payments to recoup his investment. The scheme failed in the Panic of 1857, leaving a network of unpaved roads that became muddy when rains flooded the area. This gave rise to the name "Mudville", which was applied to the area for many years. Residents were eventually able to improve the neighborhood, and it is no longer known by that name.

== See also ==
- National Register of Historic Places listings in Reading, Massachusetts
- National Register of Historic Places listings in Middlesex County, Massachusetts
