= Gilman Coggin House =

Historic house in Massachusetts, United States

- U.S. National Register of Historic Places
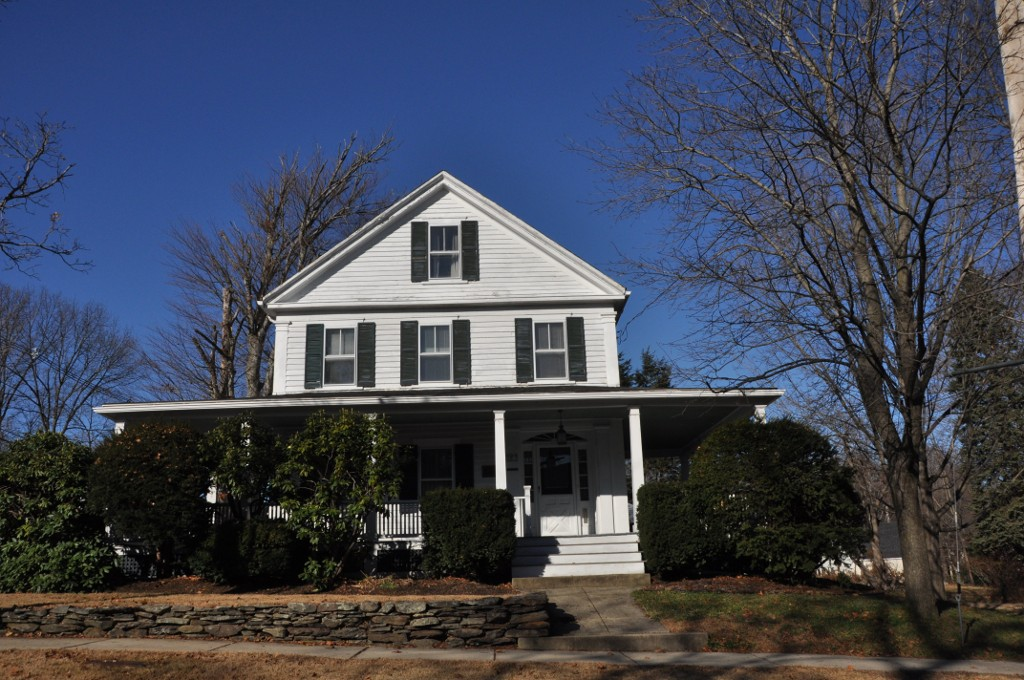

- Location within Massachusetts Location within the United States
- Location: 123 Prescott Street, Reading, Massachusetts
- Coordinates: 42°31′6.72″N 71°6′53.15″W
- Built: 1847
- Architectural style: Greek Revival
- MPS: Reading MRA
- NRHP reference No.: 84002551
- Added to NRHP: July 19, 1984

The Gilman Coggin House is a historic house in Reading, Massachusetts. The 2 1/2-story wood-frame house is a fine well preserved local example of Greek Revival architecture. It was built in 1847 by Gilman Coggin, owner of a local shoe-manufacturing business. The house's front gable is fully pedimented, supported by wide corner pilasters. A single-story wraparound porch has square Ionic columns, and the front door surround is flanked by half-length sidelight windows and topped by a fanlight transom.

The house was listed on the National Register of Historic Places in 1984.

== See also ==
- National Register of Historic Places listings in Reading, Massachusetts
- National Register of Historic Places listings in Middlesex County, Massachusetts
