= House at 77 Howard Street =

Historic house in Massachusetts, United States

- U.S. National Register of Historic Places
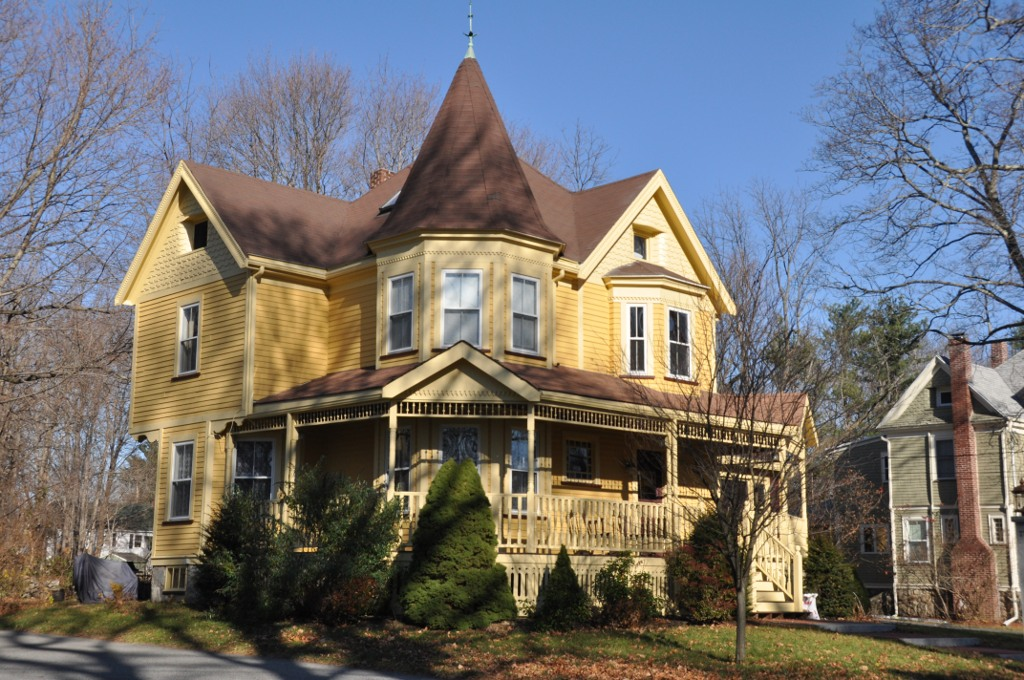

- Location within Massachusetts Location within the United States
- Location: 77 Howard Ave., Reading, Massachusetts
- Coordinates: 42°30′56.47″N 71°7′7.51″W
- Built: 1895
- Architectural style: Queen Anne
- MPS: Reading MRA
- NRHP reference No.: 84002675
- Added to NRHP: July 19, 1984

77 Howard Street in Reading, Massachusetts is an excellent example of a well preserved Queen Anne Victorian house. It was built in the 1890s, during the town's growth as a railroad suburb of Boston. It was listed on the National Register of Historic Places in 1984.

== Description and history ==
77 Howard Street is located in southwestern Reading, on the north side of Howard Street between West Street and Sigbee Avenue. The neighborhood in which it stands was, at the time of its construction, called "Scotland Hill" after a group of Scottish immigrants who lived and socialized nearby. The house is a 2 1/2-story wood-frame structure; although it has a basically rectangular massing, it has a complex appearance, with a turret on the left, bay windows on the front facade, and a large front gable on the right side of the hipped roof. The gable is decorated with scalloped shingles and has a small recessed window above a projecting oriel window. The front porch has bracketed turned columns and delicate balusters, and a spindled valance.

The house was built in the 1890s, as part of a building boom in which Reading was transformed into a railroad suburb of Boston. The area was previously farmland, on which paper streets had been platted sometime before 1893. It was developed to appeal to middle-class workers commuting to Boston.

== See also ==
- National Register of Historic Places listings in Reading, Massachusetts
- National Register of Historic Places listings in Middlesex County, Massachusetts
