= Joseph Damon House =

Historic house in Massachusetts, United States

- U.S. National Register of Historic Places
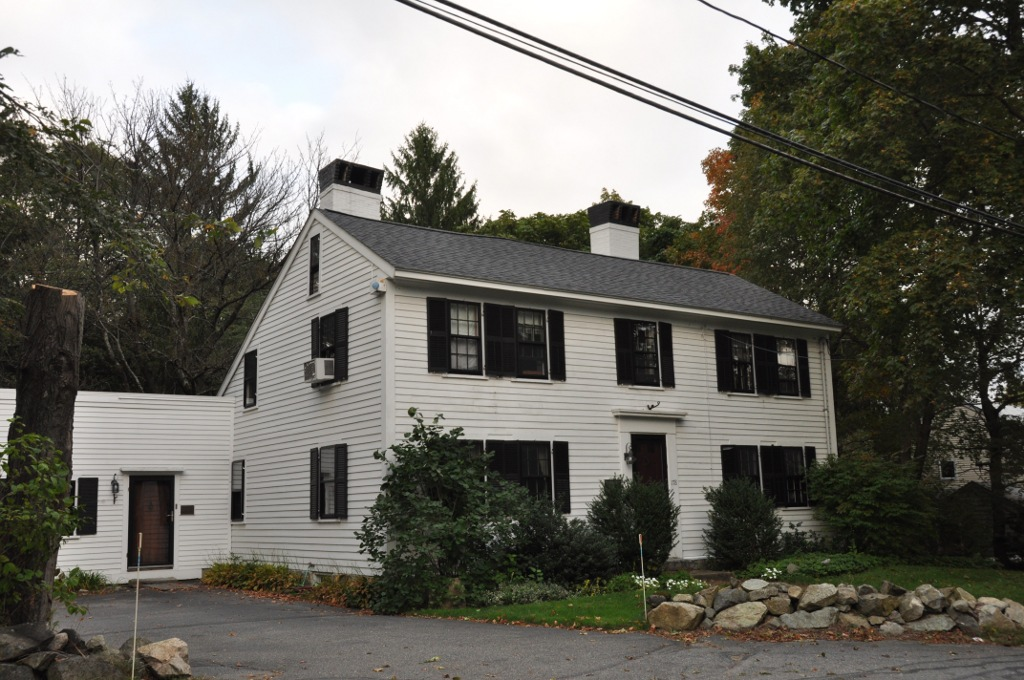

- Location within Massachusetts Location within the United States
- Location: 178 South Street, Reading, Massachusetts
- Coordinates: 42°30′18″N 71°6′59″W
- Built: 1754
- Architectural style: Federal
- MPS: Reading MRA
- NRHP reference No.: 84002559
- Added to NRHP: July 19, 1984

The Joseph Damon House is a historic house in Reading, Massachusetts. Built about 1754, this 2 1/2-story wood-frame house is good local example of a Georgian colonial house with later Federal period alterations. It also demonstrates a typical pattern of shared ownership by multiple descendants of one of its owners. The house was listed on the National Register of Historic Places in 1984.

== Description and history ==
The Damon house is set on the north side of South Street in a residential area of southwestern Reading. Facing south, it is a 2 1/2-story wood-frame structure, five bays wide, with a side-gable roof, clapboard siding, granite foundation, and twin interior chimneys. An integral leanto extends the building the south, extending west beyond the edge of the main block. An ell extends further to the rear, resting on a rubblestone foundation. The main facade has a central entry with flanking pilasters and an entablature. Windows are arranged symmetrically, but not evenly spaced.

The house was built sometime before 1754 by Joseph Damon, and a portion was inherited by his son Jabez. The house was to remain in divided ownership by members of the Damon family for more than 100 years, the various shares being finally united in 1870 by Rufus Damon. This method of dividing and sharing houses was not particularly unusual in rural settings where buildings were expensive to build. The saltbox form, while typical in New England, was unusual in Reading, where framed extensions are more often found in houses of this period.

== See also ==
- National Register of Historic Places listings in Reading, Massachusetts
- National Register of Historic Places listings in Middlesex County, Massachusetts
