= Rev. Peter Sanborn House =

Historic house in Massachusetts, United States

- U.S. National Register of Historic Places
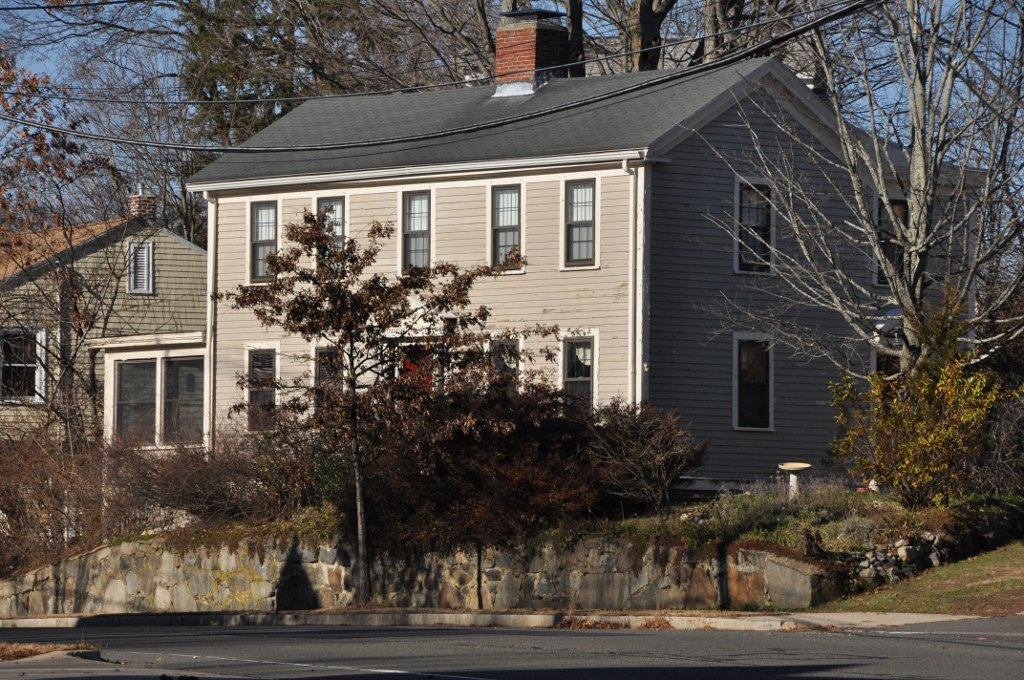

- Location within Massachusetts Location within the United States
- Location: Reading, Massachusetts
- Coordinates: 42°31′37″N 71°6′23″W
- Built: 1812
- MPS: Reading MRA
- NRHP reference No.: 84002819
- Added to NRHP: July 19, 1984

The Rev. Peter Sanborn House is a historic house at 55 Lowell Street in Reading, Massachusetts. The 2 1/2-story Federal style wood-frame house was built c. 1812 by Reverent Peter Sanborn, minister of the Third Parish Church and a significant community leader. It was purchased from Sanborn's estate in 1860 by Benjamin Boyce, a clockmaker and son-in-law of Daniel Pratt, a significant local businessman. It was modified by subsequent owners to add Victorian styling, but most of these changes were removed as part of restoration efforts in the late 20th century. The house has simple vernacular Federal styling.

The house was added to the National Register of Historic Places in 1984.

== See also ==
- National Register of Historic Places listings in Reading, Massachusetts
- National Register of Historic Places listings in Middlesex County, Massachusetts
