= Charles Manning House =

Historic house in Massachusetts, United States

- U.S. National Register of Historic Places
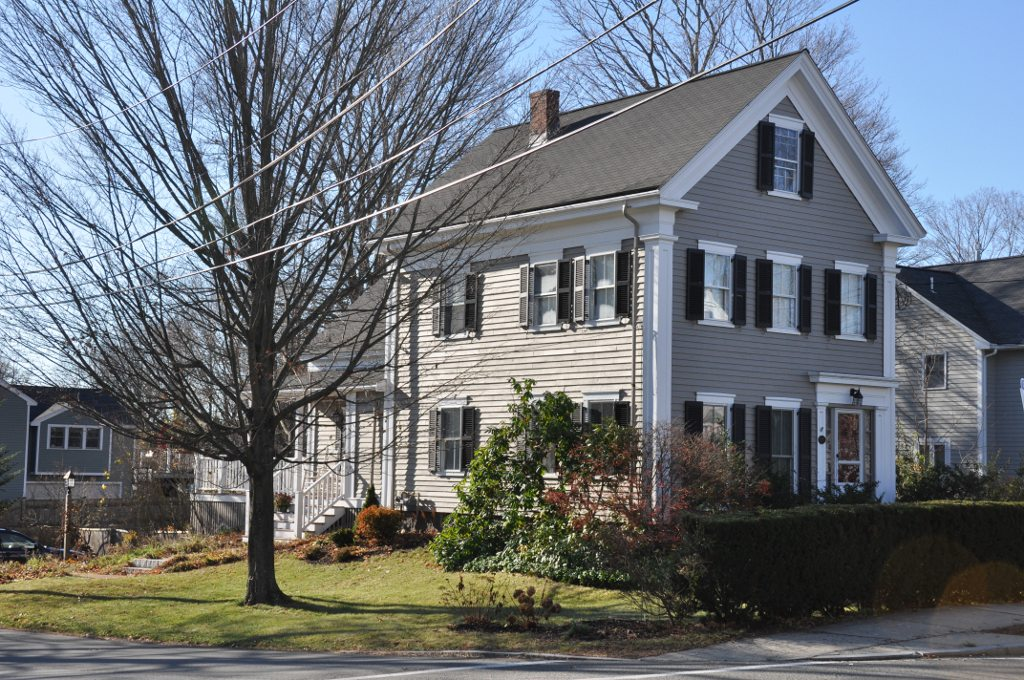

- Location within Massachusetts Location within the United States
- Location: 145 Salem Street, Reading, Massachusetts
- Coordinates: 42°31′36″N 71°5′42″W
- Built: 1850
- Architectural style: Greek Revival
- MPS: Reading MRA
- NRHP reference No.: 84002744
- Added to NRHP: July 19, 1984

The Charles Manning House is a historic house in Reading, Massachusetts. It is a 2 1/2-story wood-frame house, three bays wide, with a front-facing gable roof, clapboard siding, and a granite foundation. Built c. 1850, it has well-preserved Greek Revival details. It has a typical three-bay side-hall plan, with corner pilasters and a main entry surround consisting of long sidelight windows framed by pilasters and topped by an entablature. The windows are topped by shallow pedimented lintels. Charles Manning was a longtime Reading resident and part of its woodworking community, building parlor desks. Reading's Manning Street is named for him.

The house was added to the National Register of Historic Places in 1984.

== See also ==
- National Register of Historic Places listings in Reading, Massachusetts
- National Register of Historic Places listings in Middlesex County, Massachusetts
