= Damon =

Damon may refer to:

== Places in the United States ==
- Damon, Illinois, an unincorporated community
- Damon, Missouri, a ghost town
- Damon, Texas, a census-designated place
- Damon, Virginia, an unincorporated community
- Lake Damon, Florida
- Damon Marsh, Oakland, California
- Potsdam Municipal Airport, Potsdam, New York, also known as Damon Field

== People and fictional characters ==
- Damon (given name), a list of people and fictional characters
- Damon (surname)

== Other uses ==
- Damon (TV series), a sitcom starring Damon Wayans
- Damon Records, a record label
- Damon (arachnid), a genus of whip spiders
- Damon Prison, an Israeli prison near Haifa

== See also ==
- Damon House (disambiguation)
