= Damon House =

Damon House may refer to:

- Damon House (Arlington, Massachusetts)
- Isaac Damon House, part of the Parsons, Shepherd, and Damon Houses Historic District, Northampton, Massachusetts
- Joseph Damon House, Reading, Massachusetts
- Washington Damon House, Reading, Massachusetts
- George Damon House, Madison, Ohio, listed on the National Register of Historic Places
- Lowell Damon House, Wauwatosa, Wisconsin
