= Fairchilds, Texas =

- Village
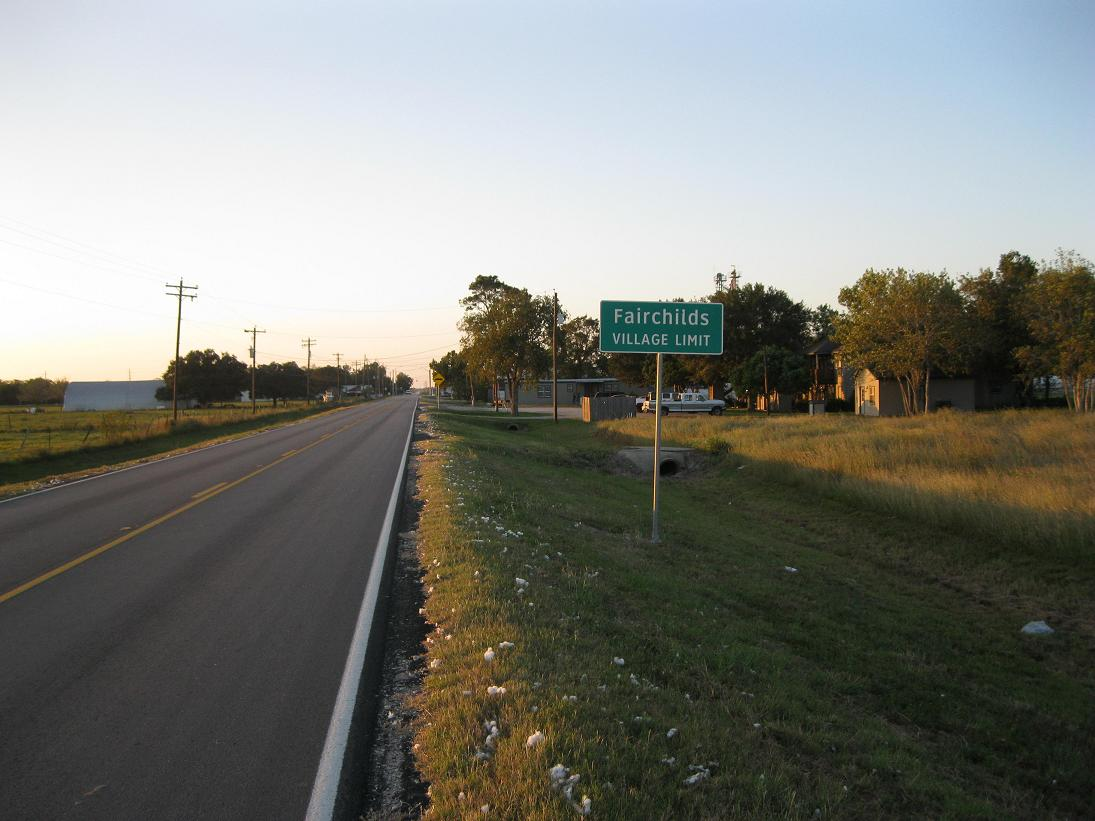
- A Fairchilds sign on FM 361 looking northwest. Bits of cotton from the 2012 harvest lie along the roadside.

- Location of Fairchilds, Texas
- Coordinates: 29°26′47″N 95°46′45″W
- Country: United States
- State: Texas
- County: Fort Bend

Area
  - Total: 2.15 sq mi (5.57 km^{2})
  - Land: 2.14 sq mi (5.55 km^{2})
  - Water: 0.0077 sq mi (0.02 km^{2})
- Elevation: 79 ft (24 m)

Population (2020)
  - Total: 864
  - Density: 403/sq mi (156/km^{2})
- Time zone: UTC-6 (Central (CST))
  - Summer (DST): UTC-5 (CDT)
- ZIP code: 77461
- Area code: 979
- FIPS code: 48-25068
- GNIS feature ID: 1378280
- Website: fairchildstx.gov

Fairchilds is a village in Fort Bend County, Texas, United States, within the Houston–Pasadena–The Woodlands metropolitan area. The population was 864 at the 2020 census.

The center of Fairchilds is located 4 miles (6 km) northeast of Needville at the intersection of Farm to Market Road 361 (Fairchilds-Long Point Road) and Needville-Fairchilds Road. The Fairchild Farmer Co-op Gin and a few other businesses can be found near the intersection. Established in 1890 by three men of German descent, the community is named after a man who settled there around 1840.

== Geography ==
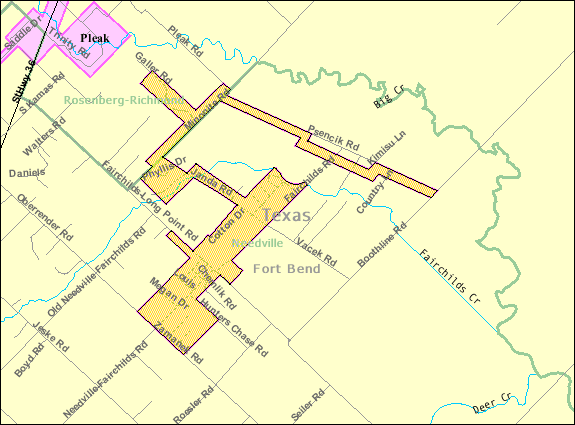
Map of Fairchilds

Fairchilds is located in south-central Fort Bend County at 29°26′47″N 95°46′45″W (29.446300, –95.779208). According to the United States Census Bureau, the village has a total area of 2.0 square miles (5.2 km^{2}), of which 0.01 square miles (0.02 km^{2}), or 0.31%, is water.

FM 361 starts at Farm to Market Road 1994 in Long Point to the southeast of Fairchilds. It runs in a nearly straight line through the center of the village and continues to the northwest where it feeds into Texas State Highway 36 south of Pleak. The Needville-Fairchilds Road goes southwest from the center of Fairchilds toward Needville while the Fairchilds Road heads to the northeast. Most area roads conform to the diagonal road net. The Janda Country Estates and Fairchild Manor subdivisions are located to the northeast. Many local roads bear German names like Hein, Kneitz, Beyer, Roesler and Oberrender, or Czech names such as Chmelik, Janda, Zamanek, Psencik and Vacek.

Big Creek, a tributary of the Brazos River, flows through the area from Pleak to the southeast, passing along the northeast edge of Fairchilds. Nearer to the village is Fairchilds Creek which flows northeast, then southeast and joins Big Creek to the southeast.

== History ==
The village is named after Philo Fairchilds, who settled there circa 1840. He built a house approximately one mile south of the present-day community. Theo Aderholz, August Bede and Charles Blohm founded the original settlement in 1890. A group of Mennonites from the north established a colony in 1896 by buying property on Big Creek. Approximately fifty families were soon working the land. They built roads, businesses, and schools, including separate ones for white and black children. After a malaria epidemic swept the area, the Galveston Hurricane of 1900 wrecked most of the town. Most of the Mennonites abandoned the site; only a few stayed. A post office served the village from 1912 to 1918, when it closed. In 1912, Louis Kneitz sold two acres to the city to serve as a dance hall; it was called Fairchild Hall and in 1999 the city tore it down, only leaving a cupola near the site. In 1914, the community had one general store. By 1936, there were four businesses and about 25 people living in Fairchilds. Between 1940 and 1953, the village's population grew from 75 to 125. In the 1960s, there were 110 people in the community. In 1990, Fairchilds had 150 inhabitants, with a cafe and three stores selling tires, feed and general goods.

== Demographics ==
Historical population
Census	Pop.	Note	%±
2000	678		—
2010	763		12.5%
2020	864		13.2%
U.S. Decennial Census; 2020 Census

=== 2020 census ===
Fairchilds village, Texas – Racial and ethnic composition Note: the US Census treats Hispanic/Latino as an ethnic category. This table excludes Latinos from the racial categories and assigns them to a separate category. Hispanics/Latinos may be of any race.
Race / Ethnicity (NH = Non-Hispanic)	Pop 2000	Pop 2010	Pop 2020	% 2000	% 2010	% 2020
White alone (NH)	526	491	485	77.58%	64.35%	56.13%
Black or African American alone (NH)	15	18	5	2.21%	2.36%	0.58%
Native American or Alaska Native alone (NH)	1	0	1	0.15%	0.00%	0.12%
Asian alone (NH)	2	2	12	0.29%	0.26%	1.39%
Native Hawaiian or Pacific Islander alone (NH)	0	0	0	0.00%	0.00%	0.00%
Other race alone (NH)	0	4	12	0.00%	0.52%	1.39%
Mixed race or Multiracial (NH)	4	4	21	0.59%	0.52%	2.43%
Hispanic or Latino (any race)	130	244	328	19.17%	31.98%	37.96%
Total	678	763	864	100.00%	100.00%	100.00%

As of the census of 2000, there were 678 people, 211 households, and 181 families residing in the village. The population density was 306.1 inhabitants per square mile (118.2/km^{2}). There were 226 housing units at an average density of 102.0 per square mile (39.4/km^{2}). The racial makeup of the village was 89.97% White, 2.21% African American, 0.15% Native American, 0.29% Asian, 6.05% from other races, and 1.33% from two or more races. Hispanic or Latino of any race were 19.17% of the population.

There were 211 households, out of which 49.3% had children under the age of 18 living with them, 76.3% were married couples living together, 7.1% had a female householder with no husband present, and 14.2% were non-families. 11.4% of all households were made up of individuals, and 3.3% had someone living alone who was 65 years of age or older. The average household size was 3.21 and the average family size was 3.52.

In the village, the population was spread out, with 32.3% under the age of 18, 6.9% from 18 to 24, 31.1% from 25 to 44, 22.1% from 45 to 64, and 7.5% who were 65 years of age or older. The median age was 33 years. For every 100 females, there were 98.8 males. For every 100 females age 18 and over, there were 94.5 males.

The median income for a household in the village was $52,500, and the median income for a family was $58,942. Males had a median income of $34,773 versus $26,010 for females. The per capita income for the village was $16,653. About 1.6% of families and 4.4% of the population were below the poverty line, including 7.7% of those under age 18 and none of those age 65 or over.

== Education ==
Fairchilds residents are zoned to schools in the Needville Independent School District. Needville High School serves the community. The Lamar Consolidated Independent School District serves a small portion of the community.

== Gallery ==
Cotton is processed at the Farmers Co-op Gin.	The view northwest from the Farmers Co-op Gin is of a few local businesses.	There are semi-truck-sized bales of cotton stored on this lot along Fairchilds Road.	The view southeast shows open fields along FM 361.	
Fairchild Farmers Co-op Gin on FM 361	View of Stavinoha Tire on FM 361	Cotton bales at sunset on Fairchilds Road	Looking southeast on FM 361	The fame d Fairchild Hall (1912-1999)
