= Long Point, Texas =

- Ghost town
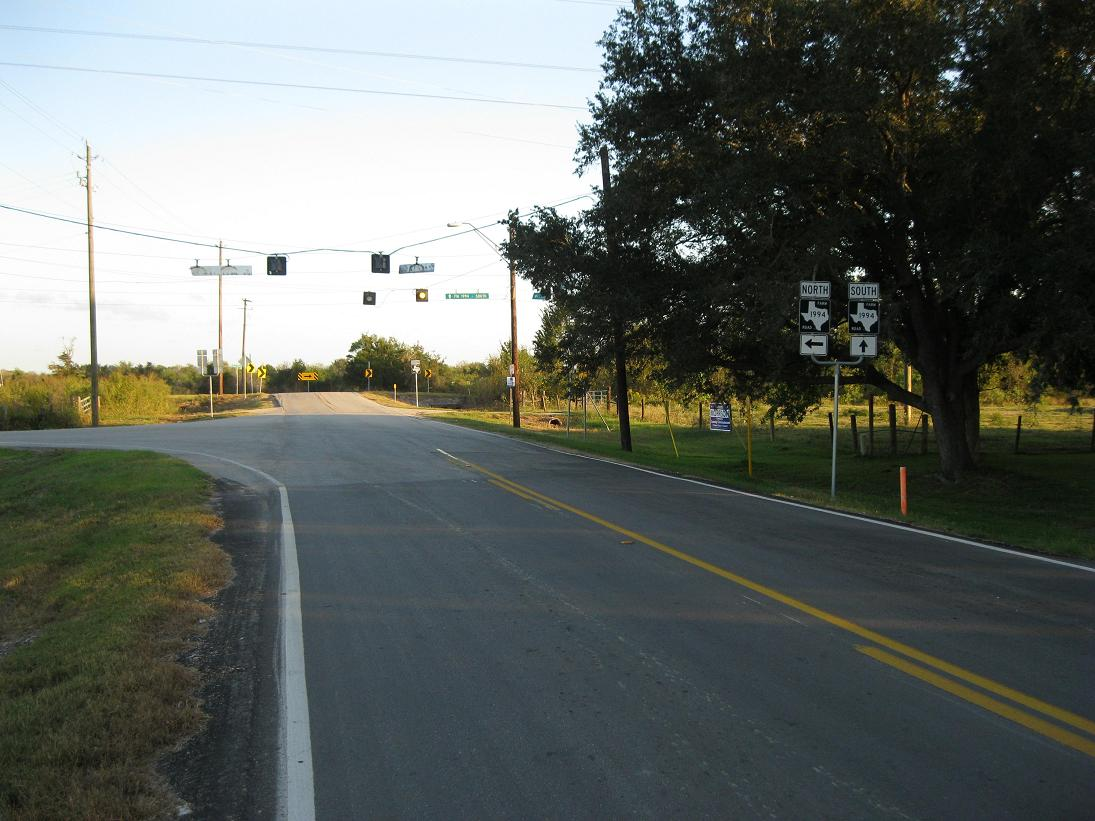
- Looking southeast on FM 361 at its intersection with FM 1994

- Location within Texas Location within the United States
- Coordinates: 29°23′27″N 95°43′59″W
- Country: United States
- State: Texas
- County: Fort Bend
- Elevation: 75 ft (23 m)
- Time zone: UTC-6 (Central (CST))
  - Summer (DST): UTC-5 (CDT)
- ZIP code: 77461
- Area code: 979

Long Point is a ghost town in Fort Bend County, Texas, United States. It is located 24 miles (39 km) southeast of Richmond at the intersection of Farm to Market Road 1994 (FM 1994) and FM 361. There is no road sign identifying the community, though the nearby roads carry its name. Petroleum and sulphur were extracted near the community in the 1930s. Electric transmission towers pass through the site and a county landfill is located to the northeast.

== History ==
According to local lore, Long Point was named for a point of timber that jutted into the prairie near the site. In 1936, the community was served by a metal-surfaced road, the Gulf, Colorado and Santa Fe Railway, a sulfur mine, and a row of homes. Since there was never a post office in the village, mail was delivered through Needville in 1947. In operation since 1936 and still operational in 1987 is the Long Point oilfield to the community's east. Even though Long Point appeared on county maps in 1987, no population statistics for any point in the community's history are known.

== Geography ==
Though Long Point is not marked on road signs, it is preserved in the naming convention of the roads that intersect there. FM 361, which goes northwest from Long Point toward Fairchilds, is also named Fairchilds-Long Point Road. FM 1994, which runs from northeast to southwest, is also called Whaley-Long Point Road to the northeast and Guy-Long Point Road as it runs southwest toward Guy. A county landfill forms a prominent hill 0.8 miles (1.3 km) to the northeast of the intersection of the two farm-to-market roads. Electric transmission towers pass overhead within a few feet of the road intersection. The towers originate at the W. A. Parish power plant in Thompsons and go to the southwest. An abandoned railway right-of-way parallels the transmission towers. FM 1994 is nearly parallel to the transmission towers and passes under them exactly at the intersection with FM 361.

== Gallery ==
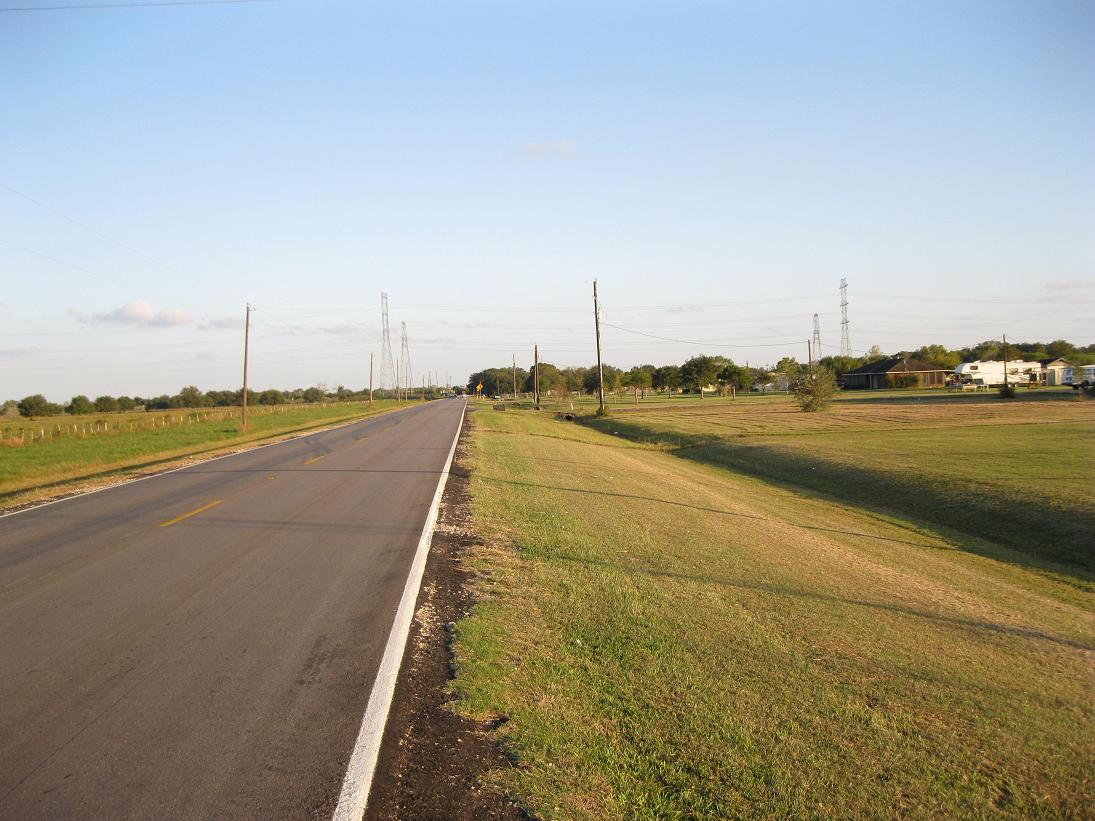
View is southeast on FM 361 toward Long Point.

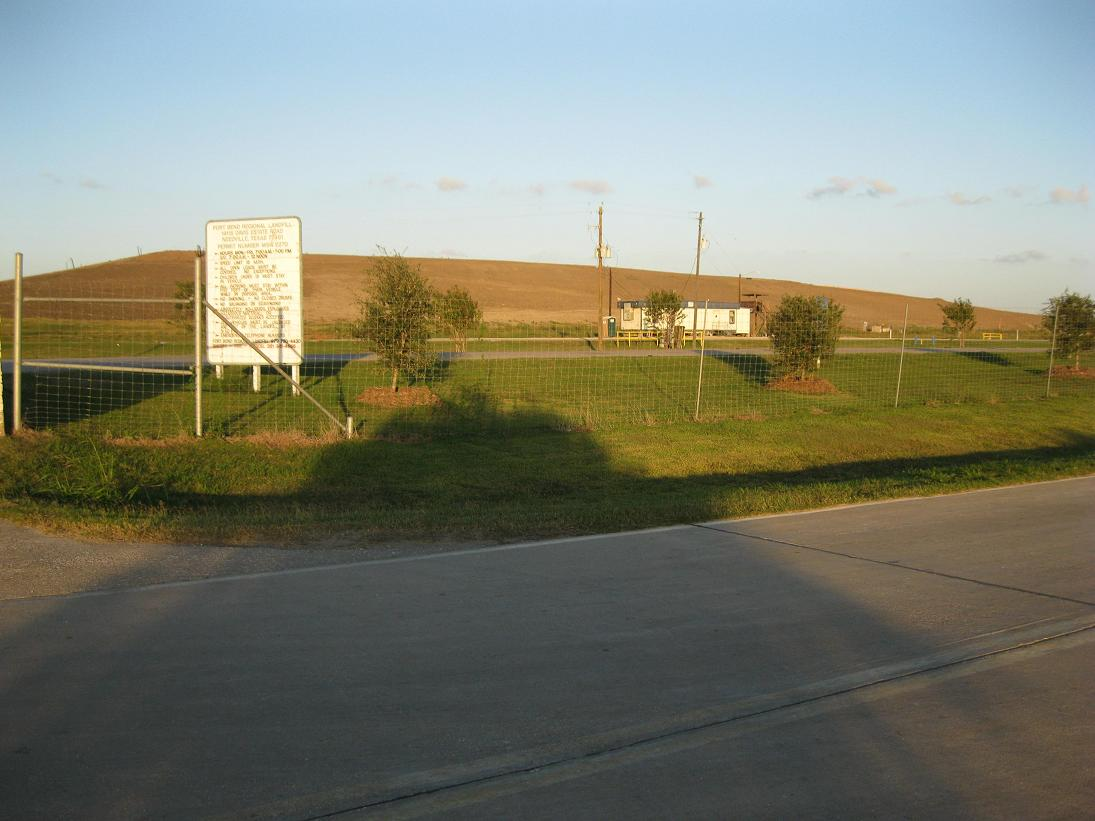
A county landfill is a short distance from Long Point.

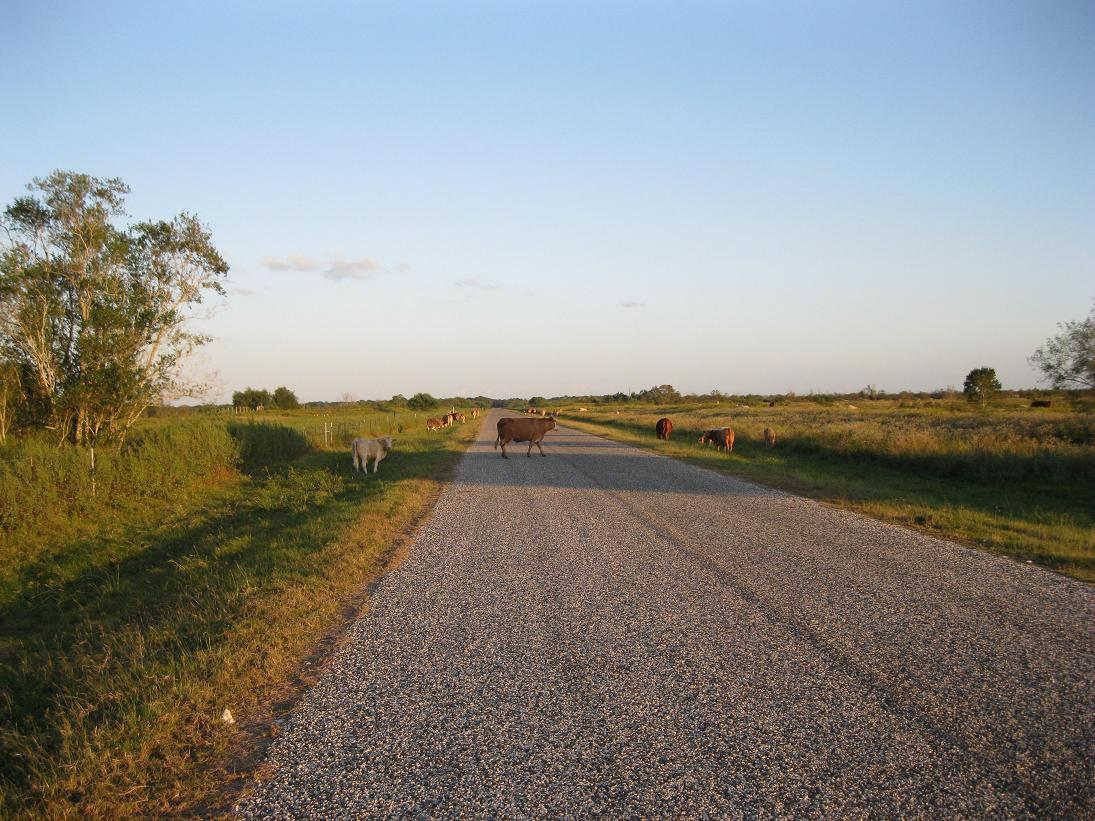
Cattle graze on Davis Estate Road looking southeast.

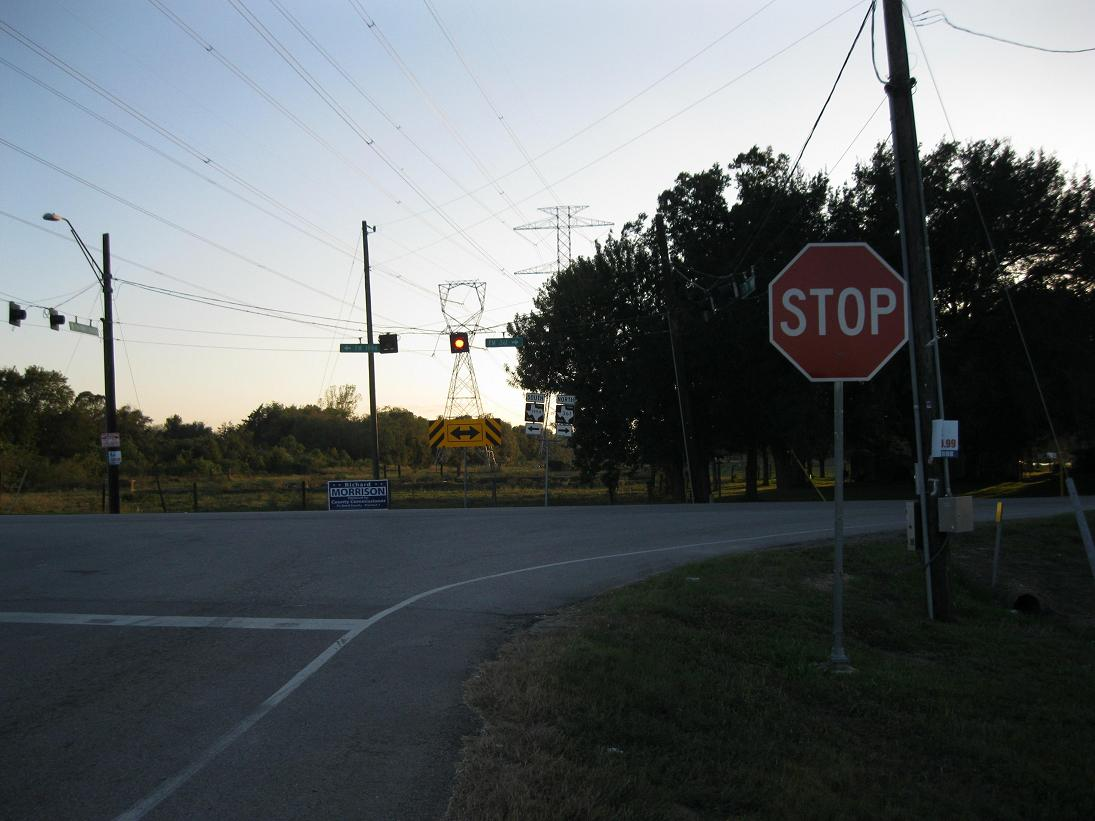
Power lines pass over the intersection of FMs 1994 and 361.

== Education ==
The first school in Long Point was established in 1936. Long Point is located in the Needville Independent School District. Needville High School serves the community.
