= House at 42 Salem Street =

Historic house in Massachusetts, United States

- U.S. National Register of Historic Places
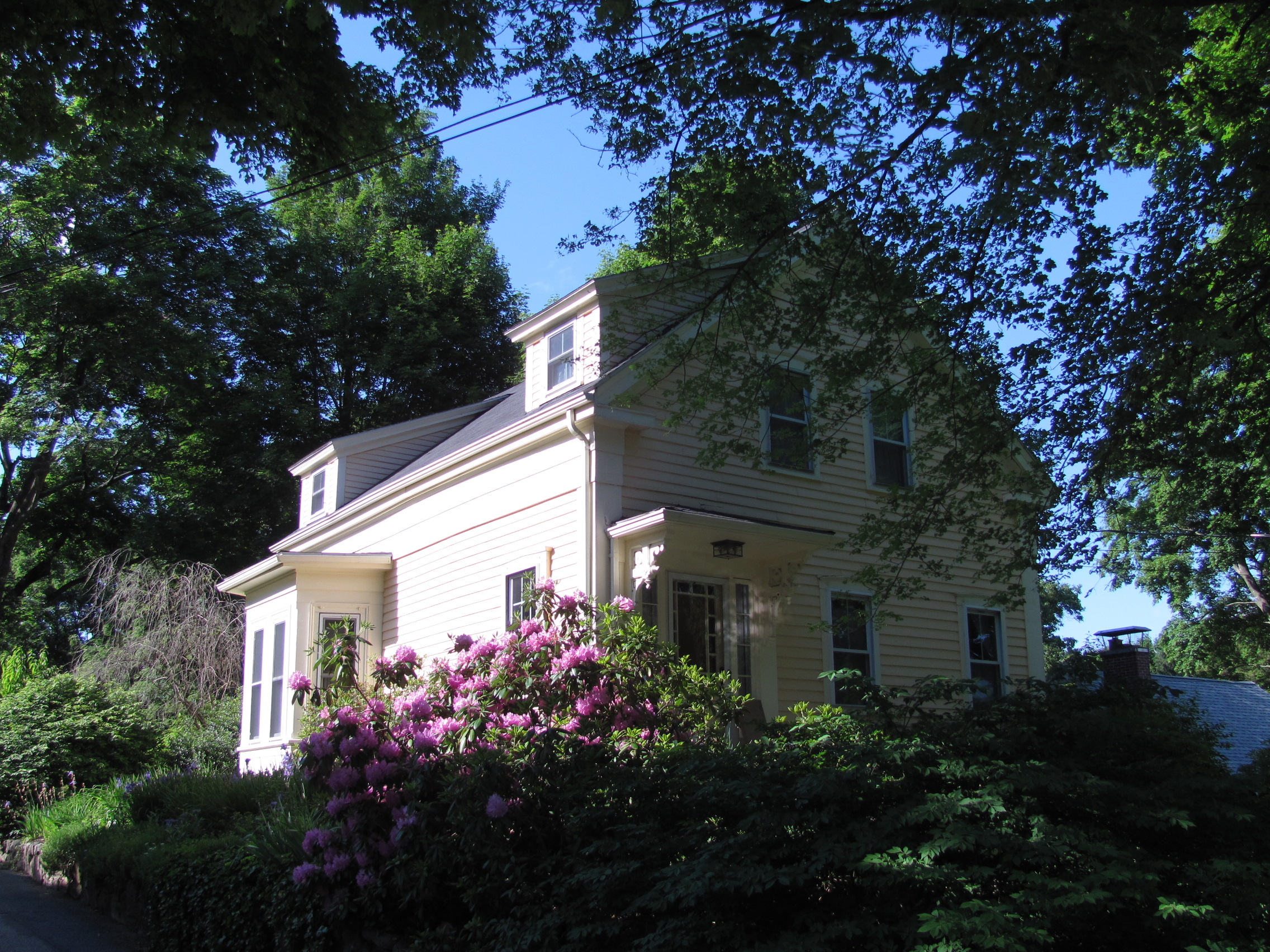

- Location within Massachusetts Location within the United States
- Location: 42 Salem St., Reading, Massachusetts
- Coordinates: 42°31′35.18″N 71°6′2.08″W
- Built: 1845
- Architectural style: Greek Revival, Italianate
- MPS: Reading MRA
- NRHP reference No.: 84002649
- Added to NRHP: July 19, 1984

The House at 42 Salem Street in Reading, Massachusetts is a transitional Greek Revival-Italianate house. Built sometime before 1854, its gable end faces the street, with the door on the left bay of three, a typical Greek Revival side hall layout. The doorway is topped by a heavy Italianate hood. The windows have shallow pedimented lintels, and the left facade has a projecting square bay. The house was occupied for many years by S. H. Dinsmore, a cabinetmaker who originally worked from a shop in the rear of the property and later moved to a larger space (since demolished) a short way down Salem Street. The house is typical of small industry that developed along Salem Street in the second half of the 19th century. It is next door to the Washington Damon House.

The house was listed on the National Register of Historic Places in 1984.

== See also ==
- National Register of Historic Places listings in Reading, Massachusetts
- National Register of Historic Places listings in Middlesex County, Massachusetts
