= Damon, Texas =

- Census-designated place
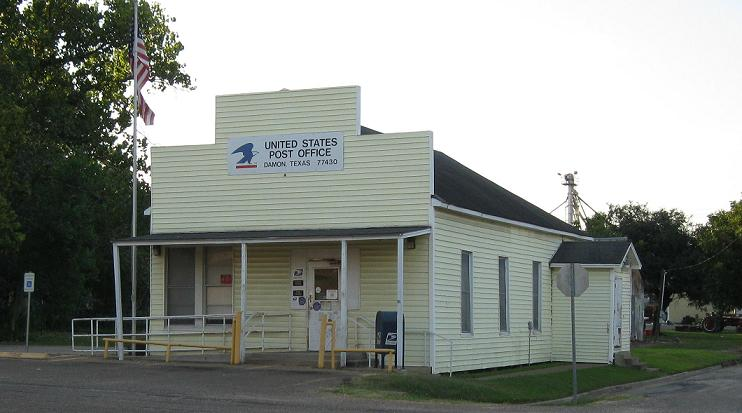
- US Post Office in Damon, Texas

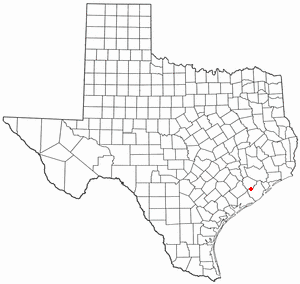
- Location of Damon, Texas.

- Coordinates: 29°17′22″N 95°44′13″W
- Country: United States
- State: Texas
- County: Brazoria

Area
  - Total: 1.4 sq mi (3.6 km^{2})
  - Land: 1.4 sq mi (3.6 km^{2})
  - Water: 0 sq mi (0.0 km^{2})
- Elevation: 79 ft (24 m)

Population (2020)
  - Total: 436
  - Density: 396/sq mi (152.9/km^{2})
- Time zone: UTC-6 (Central (CST))
  - Summer (DST): UTC-5 (CDT)
- ZIP code: 77430
- Area code: 979
- FIPS code: 48-19108
- GNIS feature ID: 1355614

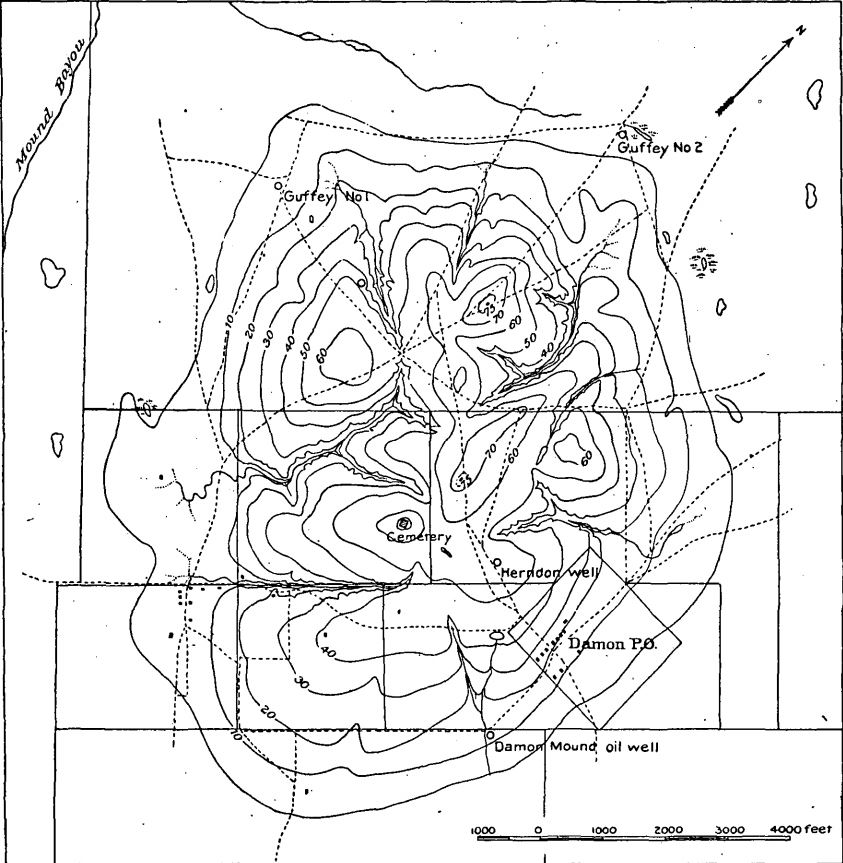
Damon Mound contour map

Damon is a census-designated place (CDP) in Brazoria County, Texas, United States. The population was 436 at the 2020 census. The town is located about 20 miles (32 km) south of Rosenberg on Texas State Highway 36. Damon sits partly atop a salt dome which was exploited for petroleum, sulphur, and limestone.

== Geography ==
Damon is located in northwestern Brazoria County at 29°17′22″N 95°44′13″W (29.289519, -95.737038). According to the United States Census Bureau, the CDP has a total area of 1.394 square miles (3.61 km^{2}), all land.

Damon is 2 miles (3.2 km) from the San Bernard River and 8 miles (13 km) from the Brazos River. The community is between Needville in Fort Bend County and West Columbia in Brazoria County.

Damon is home to the highest point in Brazoria County, Damon Mound, rising 144 feet (43.9 m) above sea level.

The west part of the town sits atop Damon Mound, the surface expression of a salt diapir or dome. The plug of salt rises through geological formations of Tertiary geologic age. The top of the salt mass is about 500 feet (152 m) below the surface and above it are limestone, gypsum, and anhydrite. Petroleum was trapped around the salt dome in sandstone and limestone layers. Five million barrels of crude oil were extracted from 85 wells in the years up to 1924. In the year 1930 alone the mound yielded 224,000 barrels of oil.

== History ==
The Karankawa people lived on Damon Mound before the arrival of Europeans. Arrowheads, burial grounds, broken pottery, and stone tools found in the area are evidence of their habitation. In ancient times, the mound's sour earth was regarded by the local native peoples as having medicinal properties. This feature was caused by the presence of sulphur and other minerals near the surface.

The area was first settled by Europeans in 1831 when Samuel Damon arrived from the United States. Damon married Lorena Darst and built a home on the south side of the mound. The settlement grew until it counted 100 inhabitants in 1890 when it was called Damon Mound. At that time cattle ranching was an important business. In 1895, the post office reopened after having been closed for three years. The town was renamed Damon around that time. A Baptist church opened in 1896. In 1918 a railroad line was built from Rosenberg to Damon in order to haul away the limestone and sulphur that were quarried from the mound.

In 1925, the town had 300 residents and a Catholic church was founded. The population dipped to 260 in 1931 at which time the town had its own school district. In 1944 the railroad line was discontinued beyond Guy to the north. Nevertheless, Damon's population reached nearly 400 from the 1940s to the 1980s. In 1989 there were 375 residents, a feed store, cotton gin, quarry and other businesses. The 2000 census reported 535 persons and Baptist, Catholic, Church of Christ, and Lutheran places of worship.

== Public services ==
Damon is served by the Damon Volunteer Fire Department.

== Demographics ==
Historical population
Census	Pop.	Note	%±
2000	535		—
2010	552		3.2%
2020	436		−21.0%
U.S. Decennial Census; 1850–1900 1910; 1920 1930 1940; 1950 1960 1970; 1980 1990 2000; 2010 2020

Damon was first listed as a census designated place in the 2000 U.S. census.

=== 2020 census ===
Damon CDP, Texas – Racial and ethnic composition Note: the US Census treats Hispanic/Latino as an ethnic category. This table excludes Latinos from the racial categories and assigns them to a separate category. Hispanics/Latinos may be of any race.
Race / Ethnicity (NH = Non-Hispanic)	Pop 2000	Pop 2010	Pop 2020	% 2000	% 2010	% 2020
White alone (NH)	377	368	261	70.47%	66.67%	59.86%
Black or African American alone (NH)	0	1	0	0.00%	0.18%	0.00%
Native American or Alaska Native alone (NH)	6	2	11	1.12%	0.36%	2.52%
Asian alone (NH)	1	1	0	0.19%	0.18%	0.00%
Native Hawaiian or Pacific Islander alone (NH)	0	0	0	0.00%	0.00%	0.00%
Other race alone (NH)	5	0	1	0.93%	0.00%	0.23%
Mixed race or Multiracial (NH)	1	9	14	0.19%	1.63%	3.21%
Hispanic or Latino (any race)	145	171	149	27.10%	30.98%	34.17%
Total	535	552	436	100.00%	100.00%	100.00%

=== 2000 census ===
As of the census of 2000, there were 535 people, 207 households, and 149 families residing in the CDP. The population density was 385.7 inhabitants per square mile (148.9/km^{2}). There were 231 housing units at an average density of 166.5 per square mile (64.3/km^{2}). The racial makeup of the CDP was 77.01% White, 1.31% Native American, 0.19% Asian, 21.12% from other races, and 0.37% from two or more races. Hispanic or Latino of any race were 27.10% of the population.

There were 207 households, out of which 30.4% had children under the age of 18 living with them, 59.4% were married couples living together, 7.2% had a female householder with no husband present, and 28.0% were non-families. 23.2% of all households were made up of individuals, and 9.2% had someone living alone who was 65 years of age or older. The average household size was 2.58 and the average family size was 3.07.

The median income for a household in the CDP was $31,111, and the median income for a family was $37,250. Males had a median income of $36,875 versus $23,750 for females. The per capita income for the CDP was $15,950. About 14.2% of families and 20.8% of the population were below the poverty line, including 29.7% of those under age 18 and 16.9% of those age 65 or over.

According to the 2010 census, the total population was 552, with 280 males and 272 females. Of this population 25.9% was under the age of 18 and 12.9% was 65 years or older. The median age was 38.3 years. 83.7% of individuals identified themselves as White, 11.6% claimed "Some Other Race", 3.6% identified two or more races, while the remainder were American Indian, Black or Asian. Persons who claimed to be Hispanic were 31.0% of the population.

== "Damon City Limit" ==
Damon is unincorporated, but has one "Damon City Limit" sign heading south on State Highway 36 from FM 1462, which usually only incorporated communities have.

== Education ==
Damon residents are served by the Damon Independent School District (K-8).

High school student attend Needville High School, which is part of the Needville Independent School District. Damon ISD signed a contract with Needville ISD in 1949 so Damon ISD residents could go to school at Needville High.

The designated community college for Damon ISD is Brazosport College.

== Gallery ==
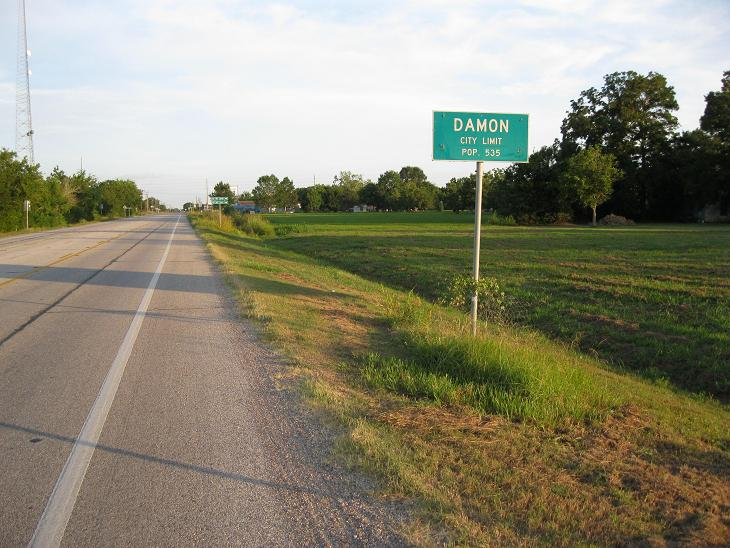
Looking southeast on State Hwy. 36

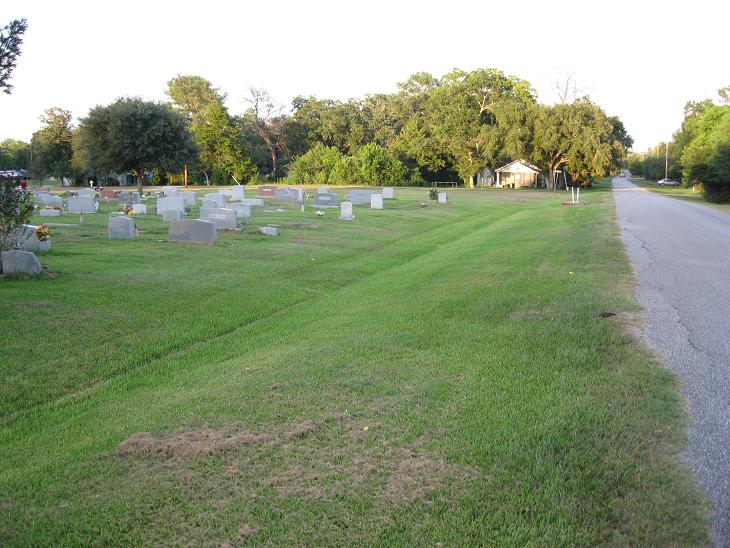
Damon Catholic cemetery

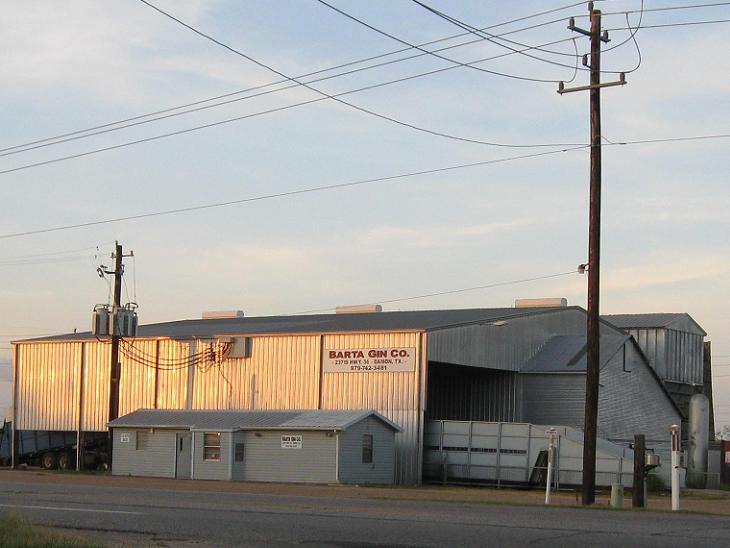
Barta Gin Company on State Hwy. 36

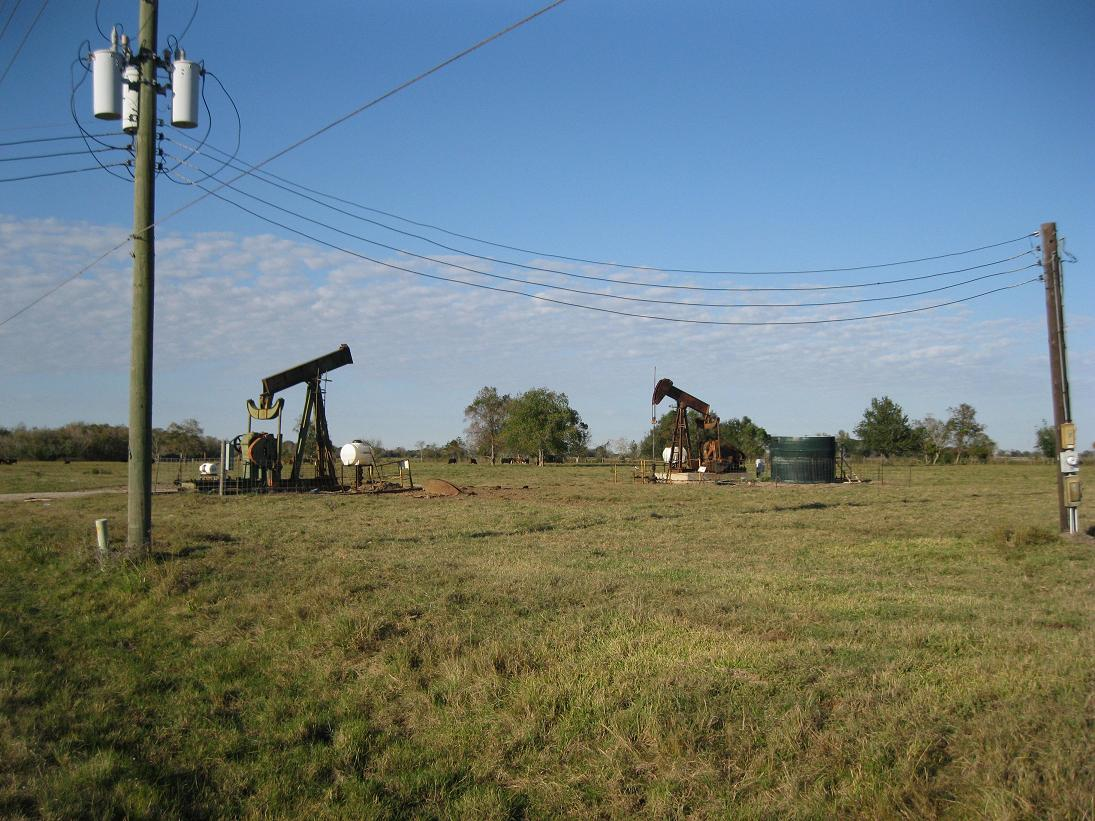
Oil pump jacks along Old Guy Road

== See also ==
- List of census-designated places in Texas
