= Needville Independent School District =

School district in Texas, United States

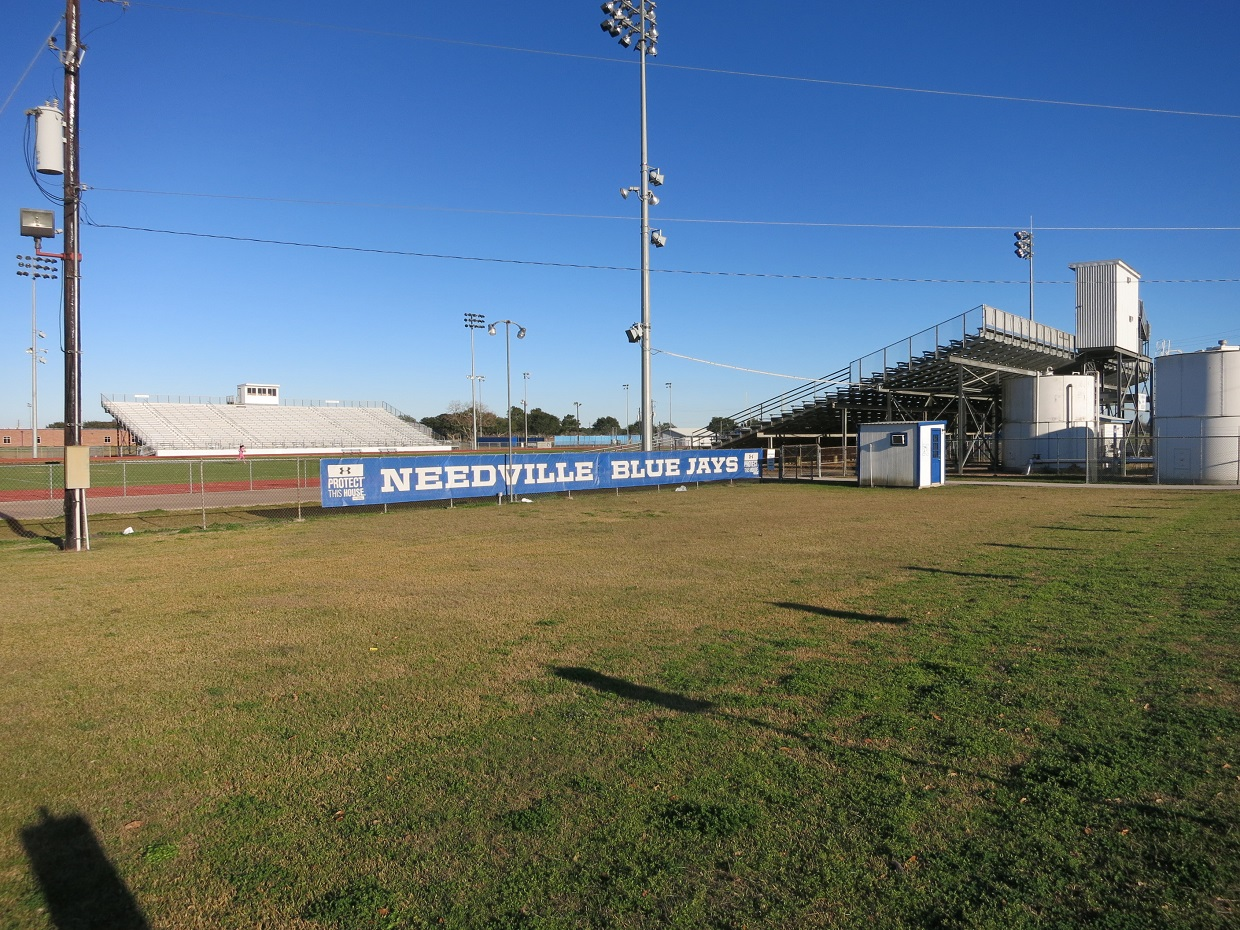
- Bluejay Stadium

Address
- 16319 Highway 36 Needville, Texas, 77461; United States
- Coordinates: 29°22′18.26499″N 95°48′14.7392″W

District information
- Grades: PK–12
- Established: December 17, 1947
- Schools: 4
- NCES District ID: 4832310

Students and staff
- Students: 3,598 (2023–2024)
- Teachers: 249.60 (on an FTE basis) (2023–2024)
- Staff: 211.24 (on an FTE basis) (2023–2024)
- Student–teacher ratio: 14.42 (2023–2024)
- District mascot: Bluejay

Other information
- Website: www.needvilleisd.com

Needville Independent School District is a public school district based in unincorporated Fort Bend County, Texas (USA) (with a Needville postal address).

The district has an area of 200 square miles (520 km^{2}). In addition to Needville, the district also serves the town of Fairchilds, a portion of Pleak, and the unincorporated communities of Guy and Long Point.

== History ==
Students from the community of Damon attend Needville High since Damon Independent School District did not have a high school. Damon ISD signed a contract with Needville ISD in 1949 so Damon ISD residents could go to school at Needville High.

In 2009, the school district was rated "recognized" by the Texas Education Agency.

In 2014, the school suspended a high school student for refusing to stand for the pledge of allegiance. After media attention, the suspension was eventually lifted due to unconstitutionality.

In 2018 the school threatened to suspend students for participating in protests or demonstrations against gun violence in schools, leading constitutional law experts to call the policy a violation of students' First Amendment rights.

== Schools ==
- Needville High School (Grades 9-12)
- Needville Junior High School (Grades 7-8)
- Needville Middle School (Grades 5-6)
- Needville Elementary School (Grades PK-4)
- Before 2007, high school students in Needville attended the old high school across the street. After the original 1947 building burned down due to arson in 2007, the school was put out of use and is only used for certain occasions such as U.I.L. Academic events.
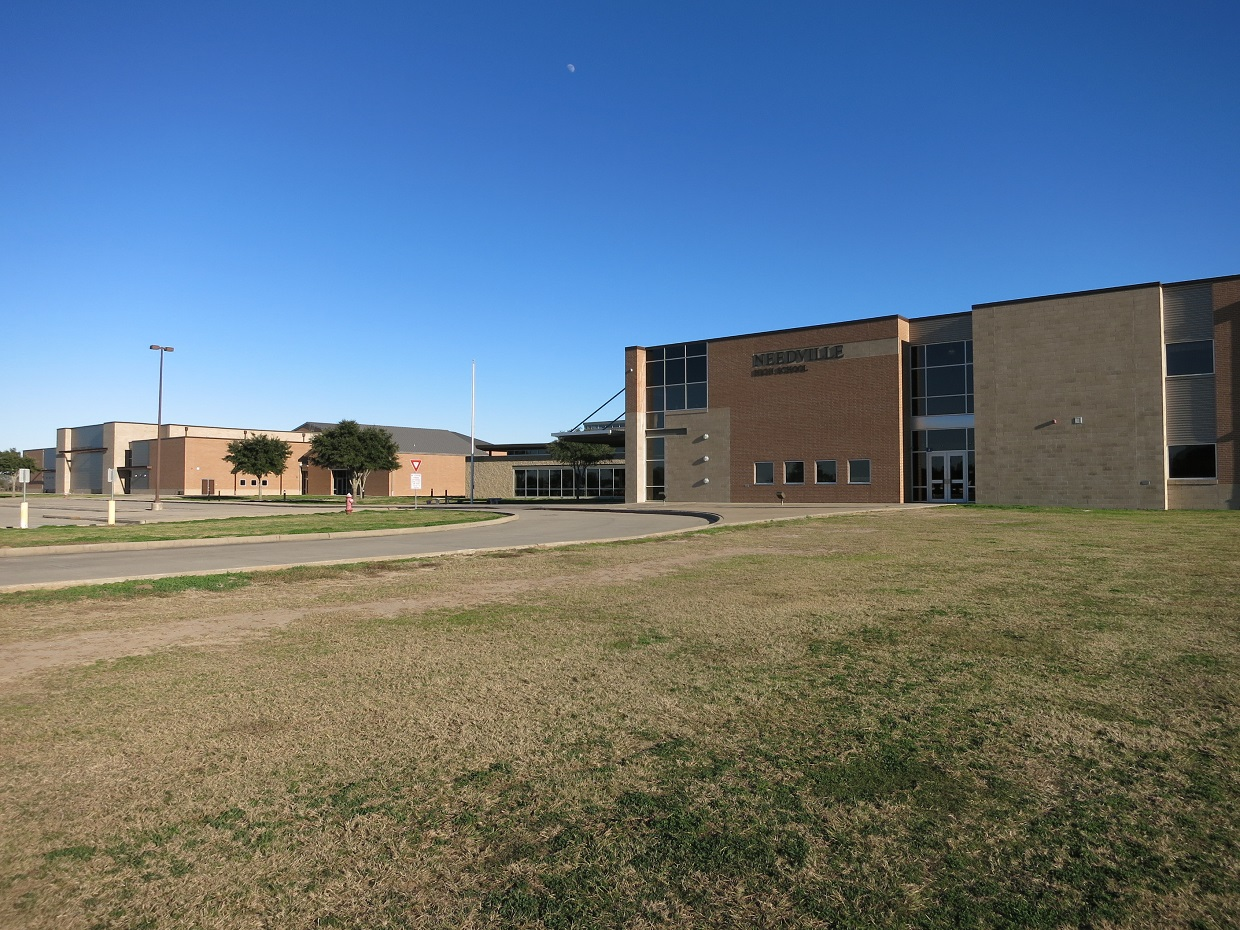
Needville High School

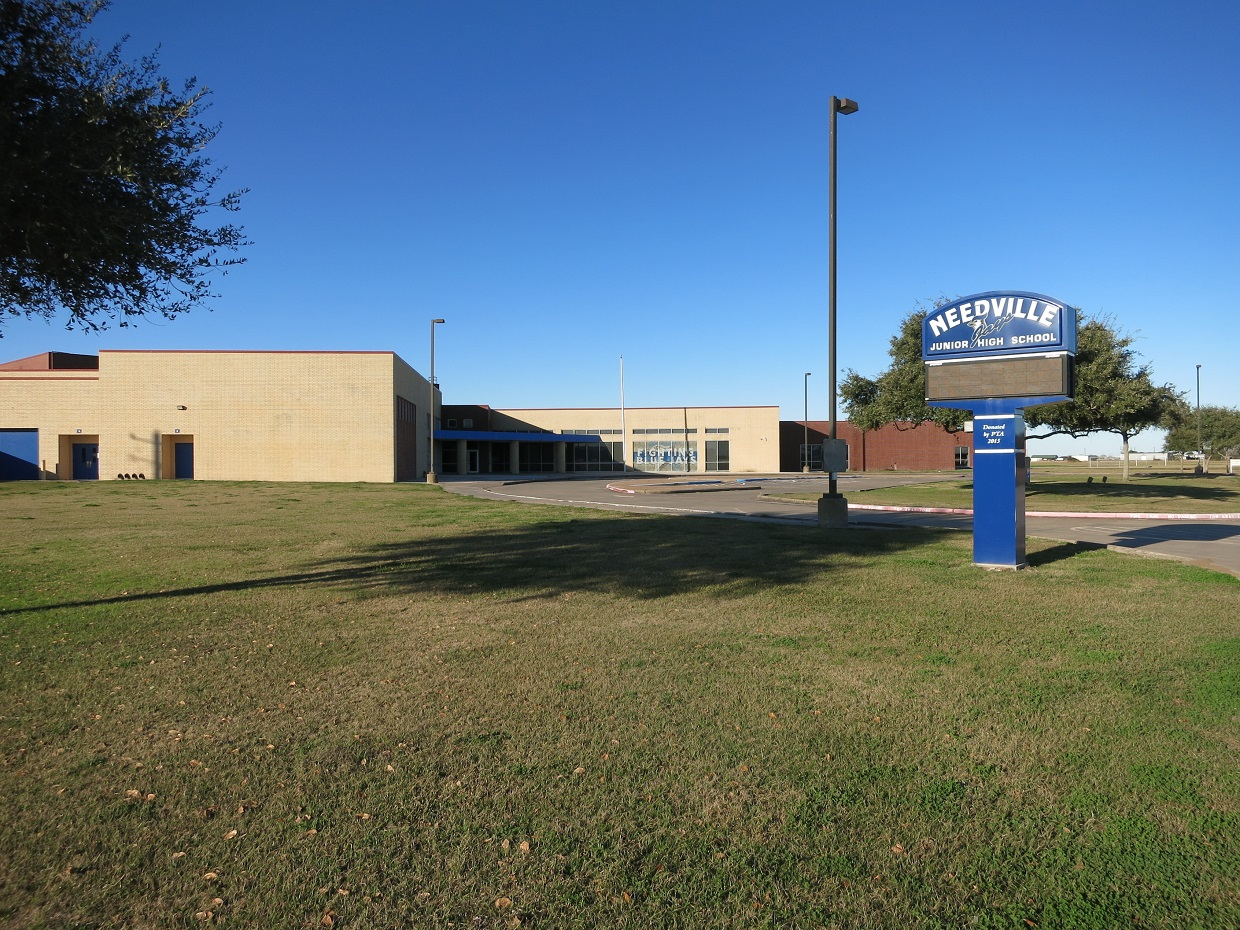
Needville Junior High School

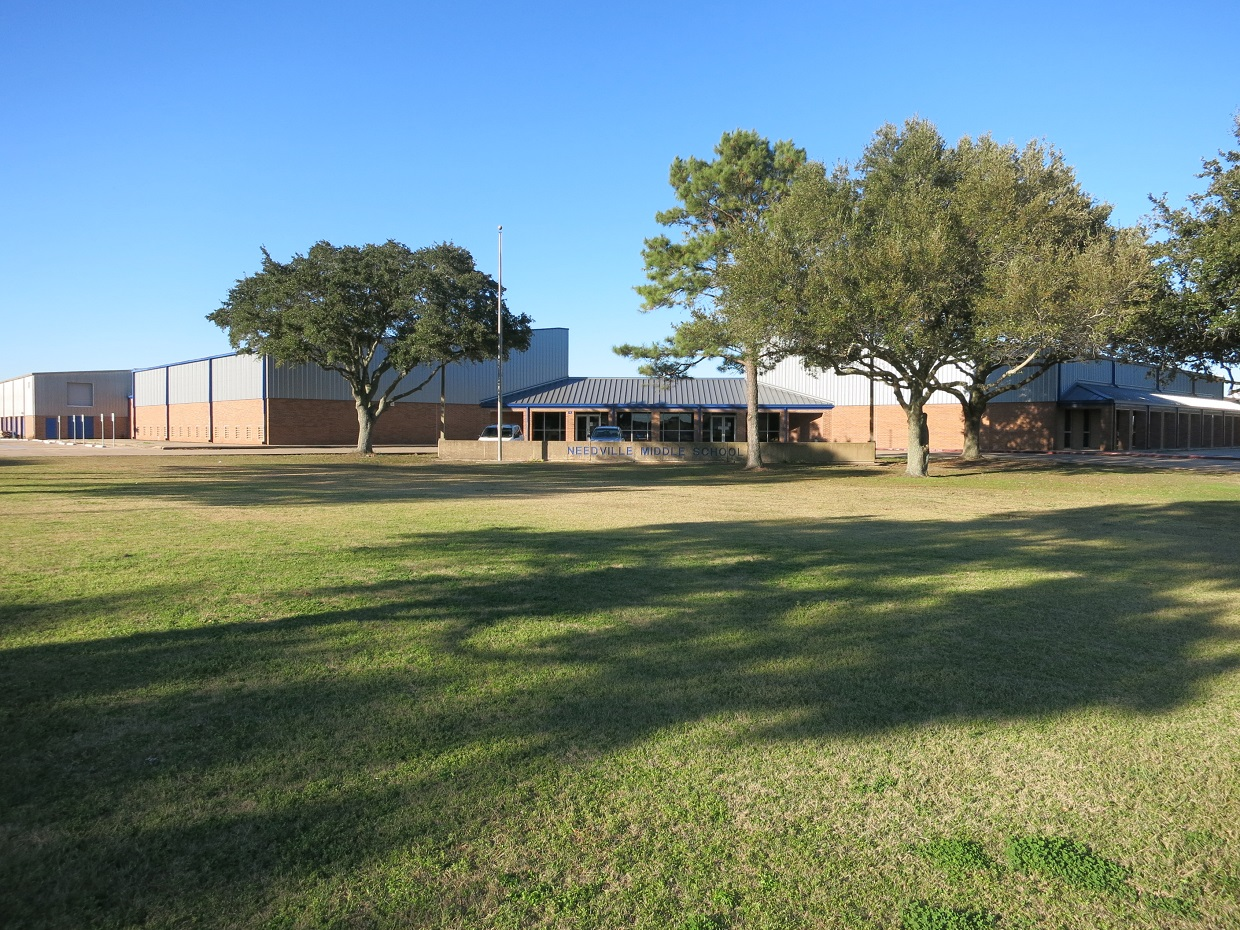
Needville Middle School

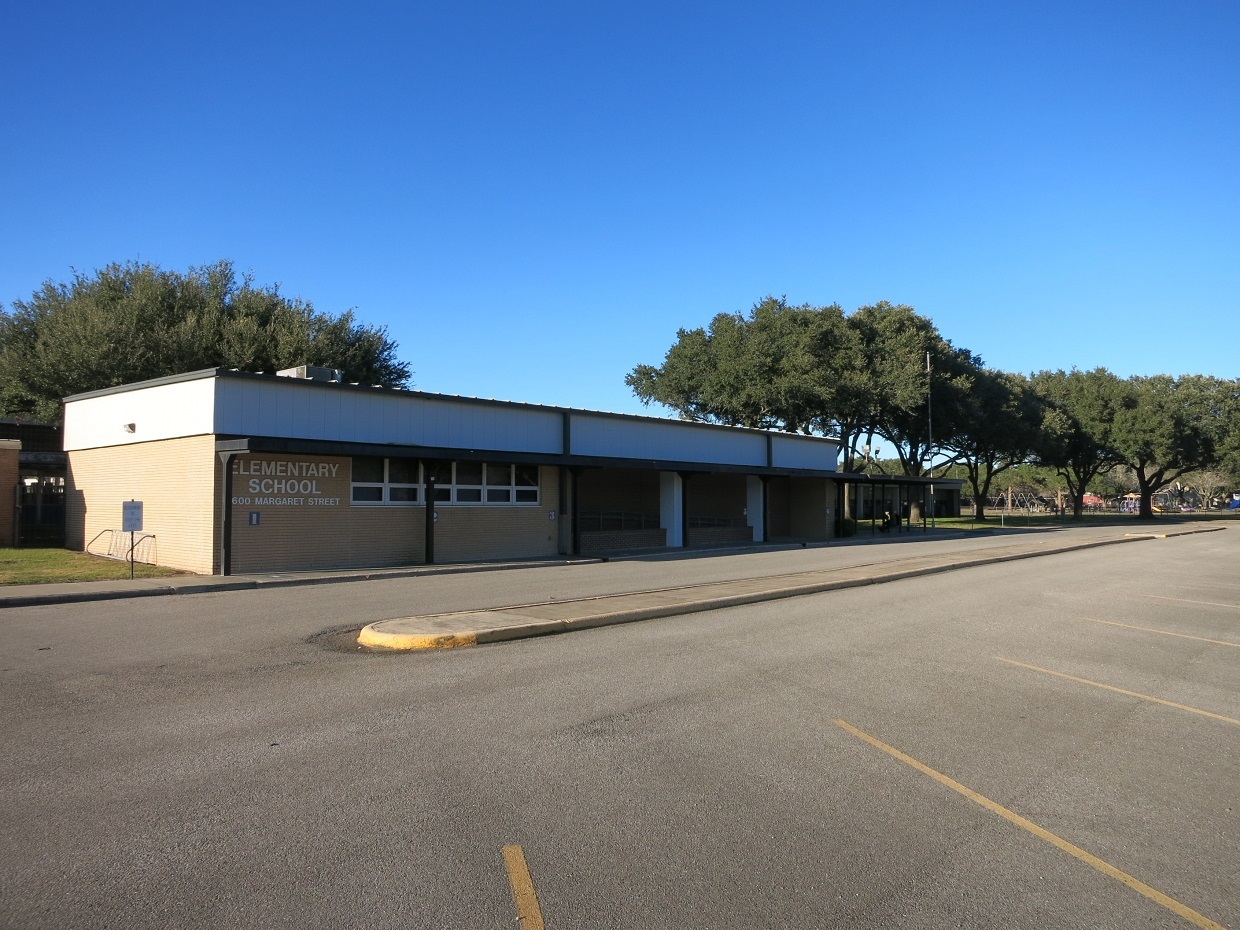
Needville Elementary School
