= Pioneer Lake =

Lake in the state of Florida, United States

- Location within Florida Location within the United States
- Location: Highlands County, Florida
- Coordinates: 27°37′21″N 81°29′40″W
- Type: lake
- Surface elevation: 98 feet (30 m)

Pioneer Lake is a round natural freshwater lake in northern Highlands County, Florida. Just to the south is Lake Viola (see Lake Viola (Florida) and to the north is Lake Pythias. Pioneer Lake has a surface area of 93 acres (0.38 km^{2}) and a maximum depth of 30 feet (9.1 m). It is found at an elevation of 98 feet (30 m).

A public boat ramp is located on the north side of the lake. There is no other public access to Pioneer Lake. Fishing can be done from the boat ramp area or from boats. There is no public swimming beach. Until a few years ago Oak Park Avenue, on the west side of the lake, allowed for additional access. However, this public road, paved with asphalt, was closed and is used by private landowners now. There was public disagreement over this decision.
