= Damon Independent School District =

School district in Texas, United States

Address
- 1211 Mulcahy Street CR 264 Damon, Texas, 77430; United States

District information
- Grades: PK–8
- Schools: 1
- NCES District ID: 4816260

Students and staff
- Students: 102 (2023–2024)
- Teachers: 16.01 (on an FTE basis)
- Student–teacher ratio: 6.37:1

Other information
- Website: www.damonisd.net

Damon Independent School District is a public school district based in Damon, Texas (USA).

The district covers grades Pre-Kindergarten through 8, making its school a K-8 school.

== History ==
The date of establishment of the first school, located near an oil field, was not recorded; the 1900 Galveston hurricane destroyed this school. A replacement building opened shortly afterwards, and in 1921 a two-story building located between the current townsite and the former townsite opened. Damon High School opened in 1924.

In 1947, Damon High School was closed. Damon ISD signed a contract with Needville ISD in 1949 so Damon ISD residents could go to school at Needville High School. Since 1947 students attended either Needville High or Columbia High School in West Columbia, Texas.

A second building and a walkway to the first building opened in 1949. Additional classrooms, a cafeteria, and a gymnasium opened in 1955, and a science building opened in 1975.

In 2016, the school district was rated "Meets Expectations with distinction by the Texas Education Agency.

== Information ==
Damon I.S.D. County District Number 020-910

Damon ISD (grades pre-K to 12th) contains just fewer than 200 students and approximately 40 staff members.

Damon ISD has a large variety of extra-curricular activities. There are many different kind of sports for the students to participate in. There is a football team, a volleyball team, a basketball team, a cross country team, soccer, and track and field competitors. There are also other ways to show your bobcat pride, including cheerleading, and a mascot.

Damon has recently added a jazz band, for a total of three bands. All bands participate in spring and winter concerts. Our band also boasts a first division rating in UIL solo and ensemble competition.

There is a student council group made up of ten students. There is also an Honor Society group made up of 12 students.

There are classes that are advanced such as pre-algebra and algebra for 7th and 8th graders. There is a three-year-old class and pre-kindergarten class for four-year-olds. Each of these early childhood classes are all day classes.

At the end of the year there is an annual banquet held for students who participate in extra curricular activities. There is a Pre-K and Kindergarten graduation along with an 8th grade graduation.

The budget for Damon I.S.D. will be between $2.8 million.

== See also ==
- Non-high school district (regarding the period when Damon ISD had no high school)
