= Randle High School =

Public school in Texas, United States

Dr. Thomas E. Randle High School
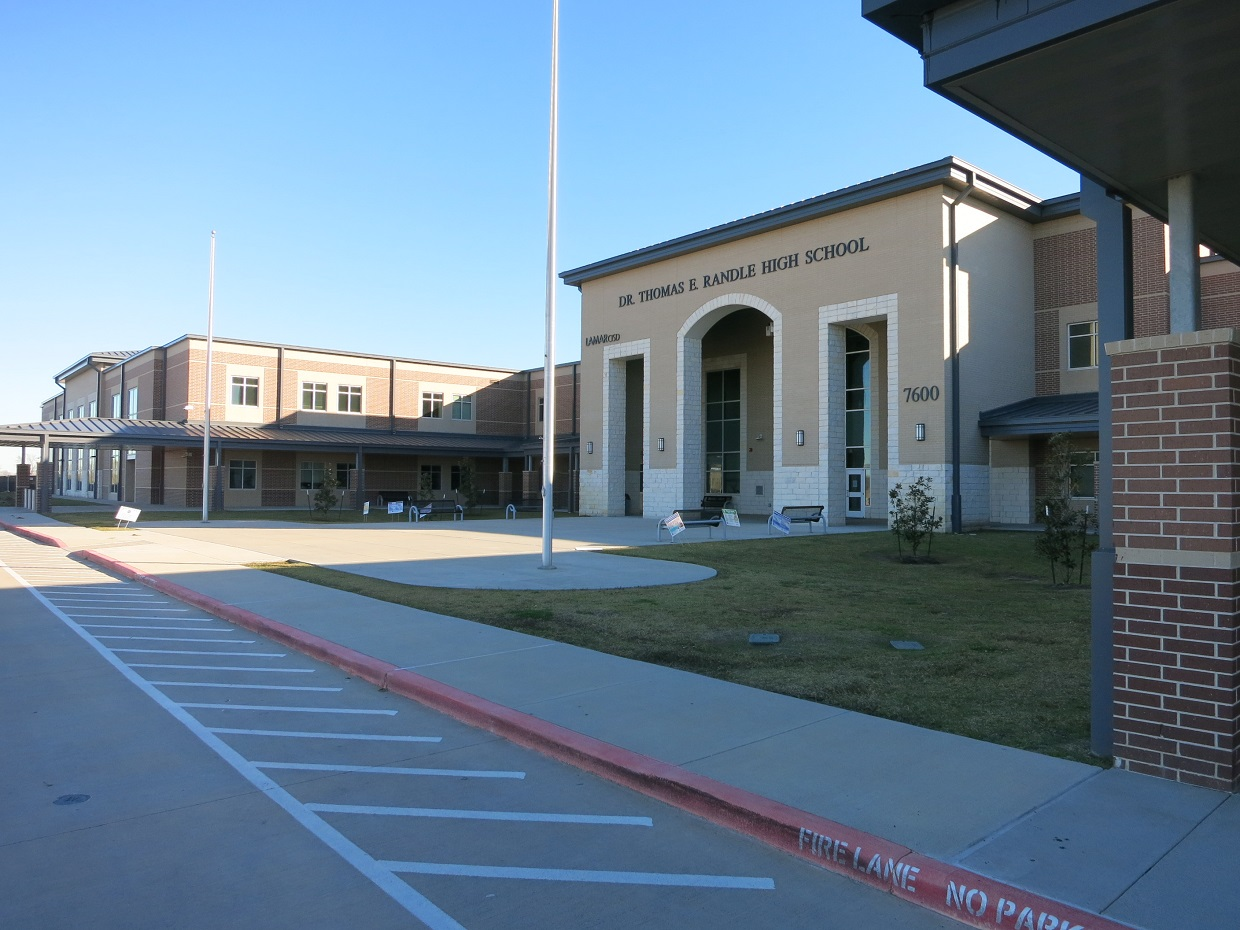

Location
- 7600 Koeblen Rd; Richmond address, Texas 77469; United States; 29.49810594640828°N 95.75511676444879°W

Information
- School type: Public, high school
- Established: August 2021
- School district: Lamar Consolidated Independent School District
- Teaching staff: 82.39 (FTE)
- Grades: 9–12
- Enrollment: 1,783 (2023–2024)
- Student to teacher ratio: 21.64
- Campus type: Rural fringe
- Colors: Black, gray, and white
- Nickname: Lions
- Website: randlehs.lcisd.org

Dr. Thomas E. Randle High School is a public high school in unincorporated Fort Bend County, Texas, United States, with a Richmond postal address. It is a part of the Lamar Consolidated Independent School District (LCISD).

Its boundary includes portions of Rosenberg and most of Pleak. It formerly served Kendleton and the unincorporated area of Powell Point.

Randle High School has multiple sports including American football, volleyball, swimming, and track.

== History ==
The school is named after a former superintendent. It opened in August 2021 as the school district's sixth high school, and was formally dedicated the following month.

The school colors and mascot were chosen by a 2020 survey of area middle and high school students. The mascot chosen was the lion, and the school colors were black and silver.

It opened with grades 9 and 10, and was to expand to other grades later.

== Feeder schools ==
Lamar CISD calls this feeder system the "Silver Track." Feeder junior high and middle schools share the RHS colors and mascot.

=== Junior high school ===
- Harry Wright Junior High School

=== Middle school ===
- James E. Steenburgen Middle School

=== Elementary schools ===
- Arredondo Elementary School
- Gray Elementary School
- Meyer Elementary School
- Thomas Elementary School

== Athletics ==
In 2024, Jon Poorman of the Houston Chronicle wrote that a "family culture" developed in the American football team; the head coach is the son of the school's namesake. That year, Poorman described the team as a "a state football championship contender". In 2024 said American football team won the Texas state championship.

In 2024 the Randle High School football team led by 4 star running back hosting over 50 offers, Landen Callis, 4 star Defensive Lineman Texas A&M commit Chase Sims, and Blake Thompson who had multiple offers at DB among others beat Iowa Colony at NRG Stadium in regionals in a 21-14 OT win, and later a 38-35 win over South Oak Cliff, winning their first state championship under Head Coach Brian Randle, whose father is school’s namesake, being the only Houston area team to win state that year with a 16-0 undefeated record.
