= Lake Pythias =

Lake in the state of Florida, United States

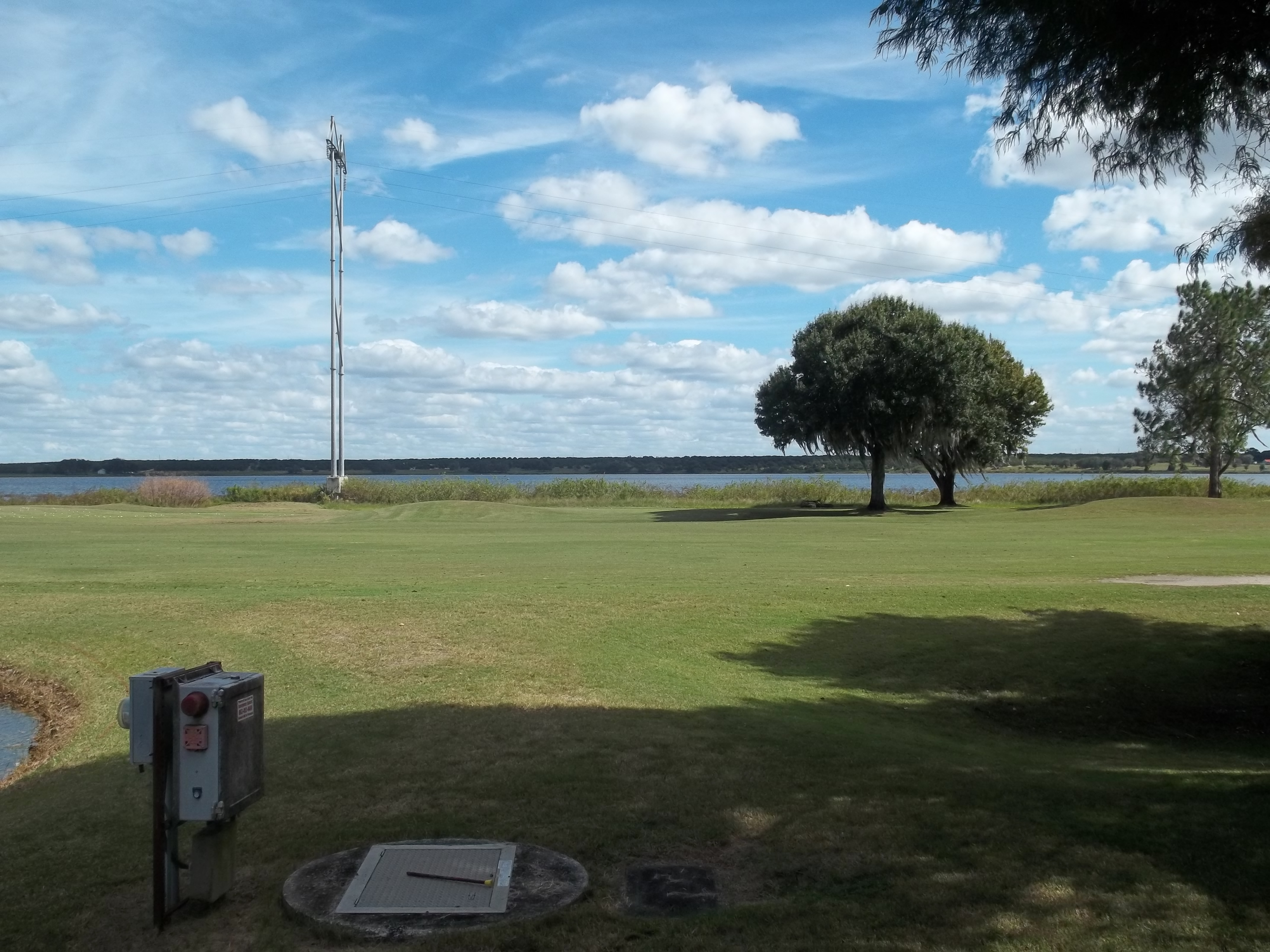

- Location within Florida Location within the United States
- Location: Highlands County, Florida
- Coordinates: 27°38′08″N 81°29′48″W
- Type: natural freshwater lake
- Basin countries: United States
- Surface area: 270.45 acres (109 ha)
- Surface elevation: 95 ft (29 m)

Lake Pythias is a circular freshwater lake in northern Highlands County, Florida. It is north of Pioneer Lake and just east of Lake Damon. Lake Pythias has a surface area of 270.45 acres.

Rivers Greens Golf Course is just beyond the west shore of this lake. However, there is no public access to this lake.
