= Pleak, Texas =

- Village
- Motto: "A small village with big expectations"
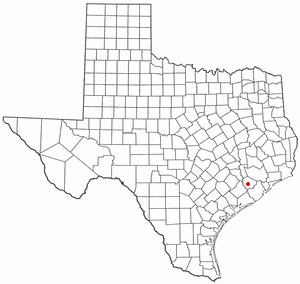
- Location of Pleak, Texas

- Coordinates: 29°29′3″N 95°48′36″W
- Country: United States
- State: Texas
- County: Fort Bend

Area
  - Total: 1.85 sq mi (4.79 km^{2})
  - Land: 1.83 sq mi (4.73 km^{2})
  - Water: 0.027 sq mi (0.07 km^{2})
- Elevation: 85 ft (26 m)

Population (2020)
  - Total: 971
  - Density: 532.1/sq mi (205.43/km^{2})
- Time zone: UTC-6 (Central (CST))
  - Summer (DST): UTC-5 (CDT)
- ZIP code: 77469
- Area code: 281
- FIPS code: 48-58088
- GNIS feature ID: 1378879
- Website: villageofpleak.com

Pleak is a village in Fort Bend County, Texas, United States, within the Houston–Pasadena–The Woodlands metropolitan area. It is on Texas State Highway 36, south of Rosenberg. Its population was 971 at the 2020 census.

== Geography ==
Pleak is south of the center of Fort Bend County, at 29°29'3" North, 95°48'36" West (29.484144, –95.810087). From Pleak, Texas Highway 36 leads 4.5 miles (7.2 km) north to the center of Rosenberg and 8 miles (13 km) south to Needville.

According to the United States Census Bureau, Pleak has a total area of 1.9 square miles (4.8 km^{2}), of which 0.03 square miles (0.07 km^{2}), or 1.40%, is water.

== Demographics ==
Historical population
Census	Pop.	Note	%±
1980	619		—
1990	746		20.5%
2000	947		26.9%
2010	1,044		10.2%
2020	971		−7.0%
U.S. Decennial Census

=== 2020 census ===
Pleak village, Texas – Racial and ethnic composition Note: the US Census treats Hispanic/Latino as an ethnic category. This table excludes Latinos from the racial categories and assigns them to a separate category. Hispanics/Latinos may be of any race.
Race / Ethnicity (NH = Non-Hispanic)	Pop 2000	Pop 2010	Pop 2020	% 2000	% 2010	% 2020
White alone (NH)	619	462	392	65.36%	44.25%	40.37%
Black or African American alone (NH)	39	23	21	4.12%	2.20%	2.16%
Native American or Alaska Native alone (NH)	2	3	5	0.21%	0.29%	0.51%
Asian alone (NH)	3	8	15	0.32%	0.77%	1.54%
Native Hawaiian or Pacific Islander alone (NH)	0	0	0	0.00%	0.00%	0.00%
Other race alone (NH)	0	1	6	0.00%	0.10%	0.62%
Mixed race or Multiracial (NH)	7	7	34	0.74%	0.67%	3.50%
Hispanic or Latino (any race)	277	540	498	29.25%	51.72%	51.29%
Total	947	1,044	971	100.00%	100.00%	100.00%

=== 2000 census ===
As of the 2000 census, 947 people, 318 households and 269 families resided in the village. The population density was 473.8 inhabitants per square mile (182.9/km^{2}). There were 325 housing units at an average density of 162.6 per square mile (62.8/km^{2}). The racial makeup of the village was 80.04% White, 4.33% African American, 0.32% Native American, 0.32% Asian, 0.00% Pacific Islander, 13.94% from other races, and 1.06% from two or more races. 29.25% of the population were Hispanic or Latino of any race.

There were 318 households, out of which 38.4% had children under the age of 18 living with them, 71.1% were married couples living together, 8.5% had a female householder with no husband present, and 15.1% were non-families. 12.6% of all households were made up of individuals, and 4.1% had someone living alone who was 65 years of age or older. The average household size was 2.98 and the average family size was 3.22.

In the village, the population was spread out, with 27.1% under the age of 18, 8.3% from 18 to 24, 27.9% from 25 to 44, 28.2% from 45 to 64, and 8.4% who were 65 years of age or older. The median age was 38 years. For every 100 females, there were 98.1 males. For every 100 females age 18 and over, there were 100.0 males.

The median income for a household in the village was $52,188, and the median income for a family was $56,364. Males had a median income of $35,313 versus $25,625 for females. The per capita income for the village was $20,773. 4.5% of the population and 3.4% of families were below the poverty line. 6.0% of those under the age of 18 and 0.0% of those 65 and older were living below the poverty line.

== Government and infrastructure ==
Fort Bend County does not have a hospital district. OakBend Medical Center serves as the county's charity hospital which the county contracts with.

== Education ==
Most of Pleak is a part of the Lamar Consolidated Independent School District while a small portion is in the Needville Independent School District.

The LCISD portion is zoned to Wright Junior High School (grades 6–8), and Randle High School. The LCISD portion was zoned to Meyer Elementary, Navarro Middle School, George Junior High, and B.F. Terry High School. Wright and Randle opened in 2021.

The Needville portion is zoned to Needville High School.

== Gallery ==
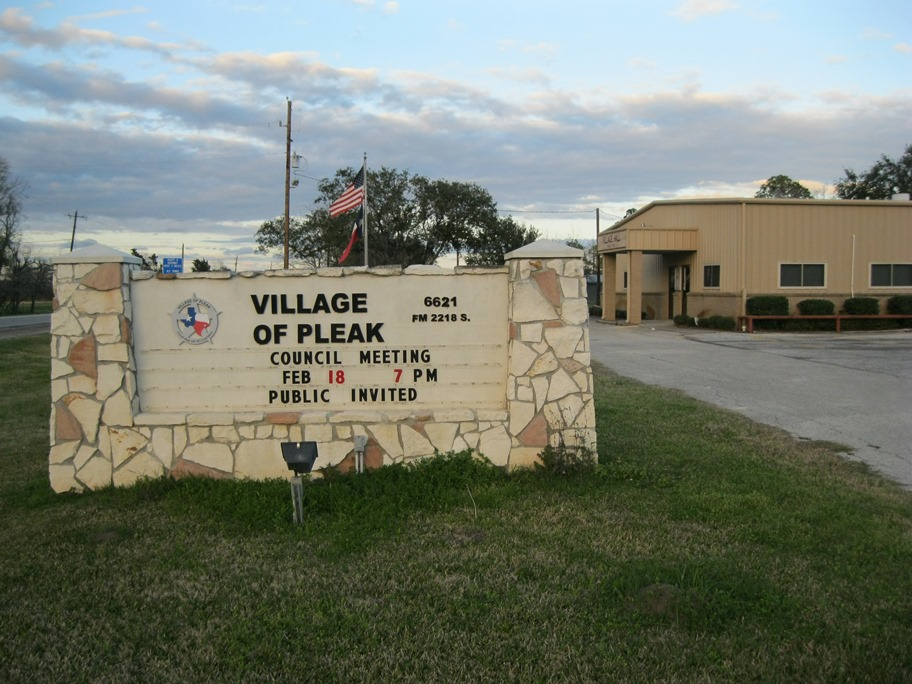
Marquee in front of Pleak City Hall

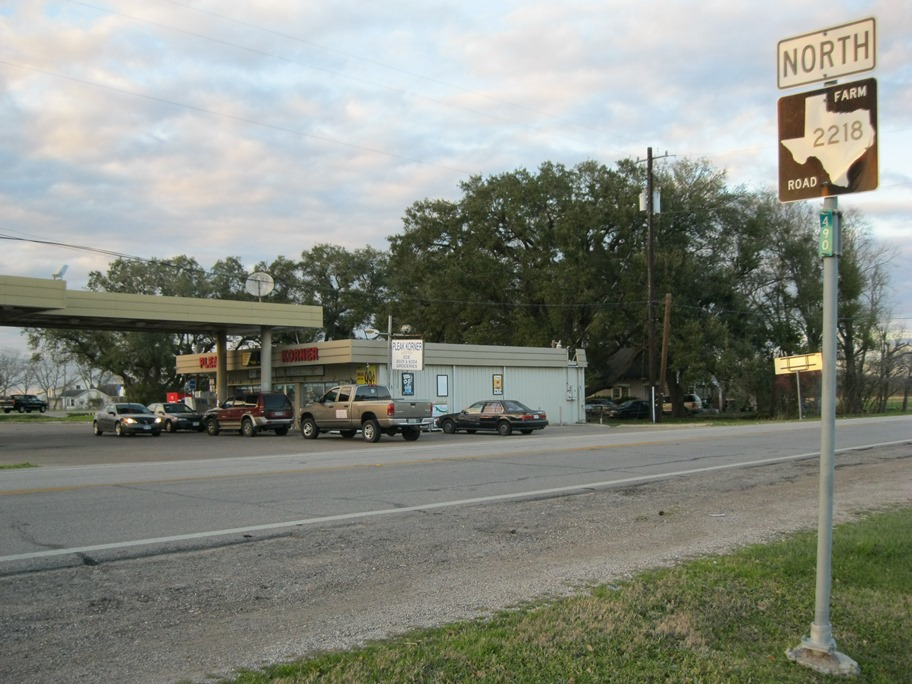
Pleak Korner business across from City Hall

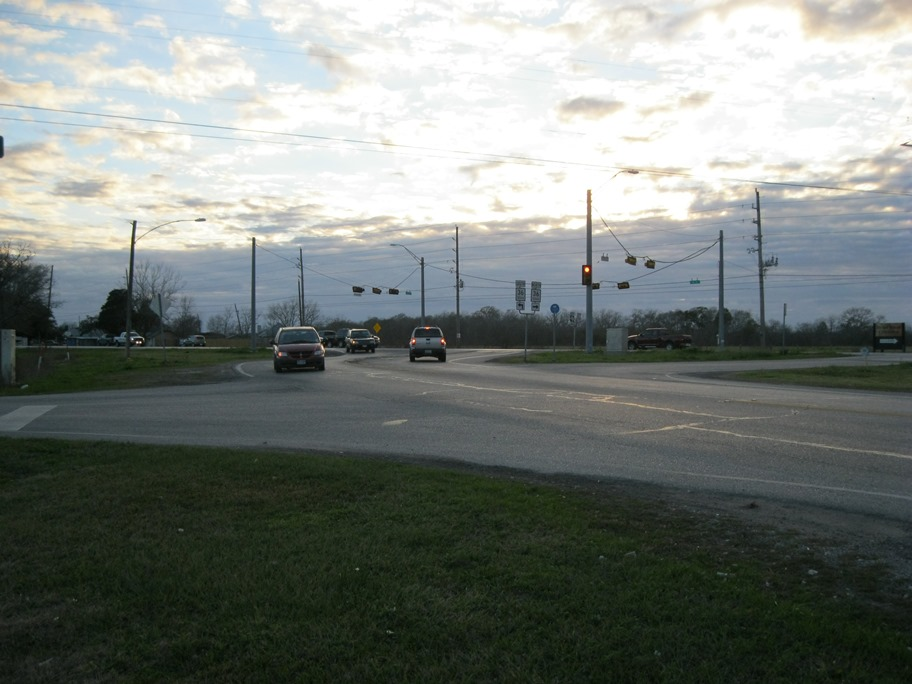
Highway 36 and FM 2218 intersection in Pleak
