= Needville High School =

Public school in Texas, United States

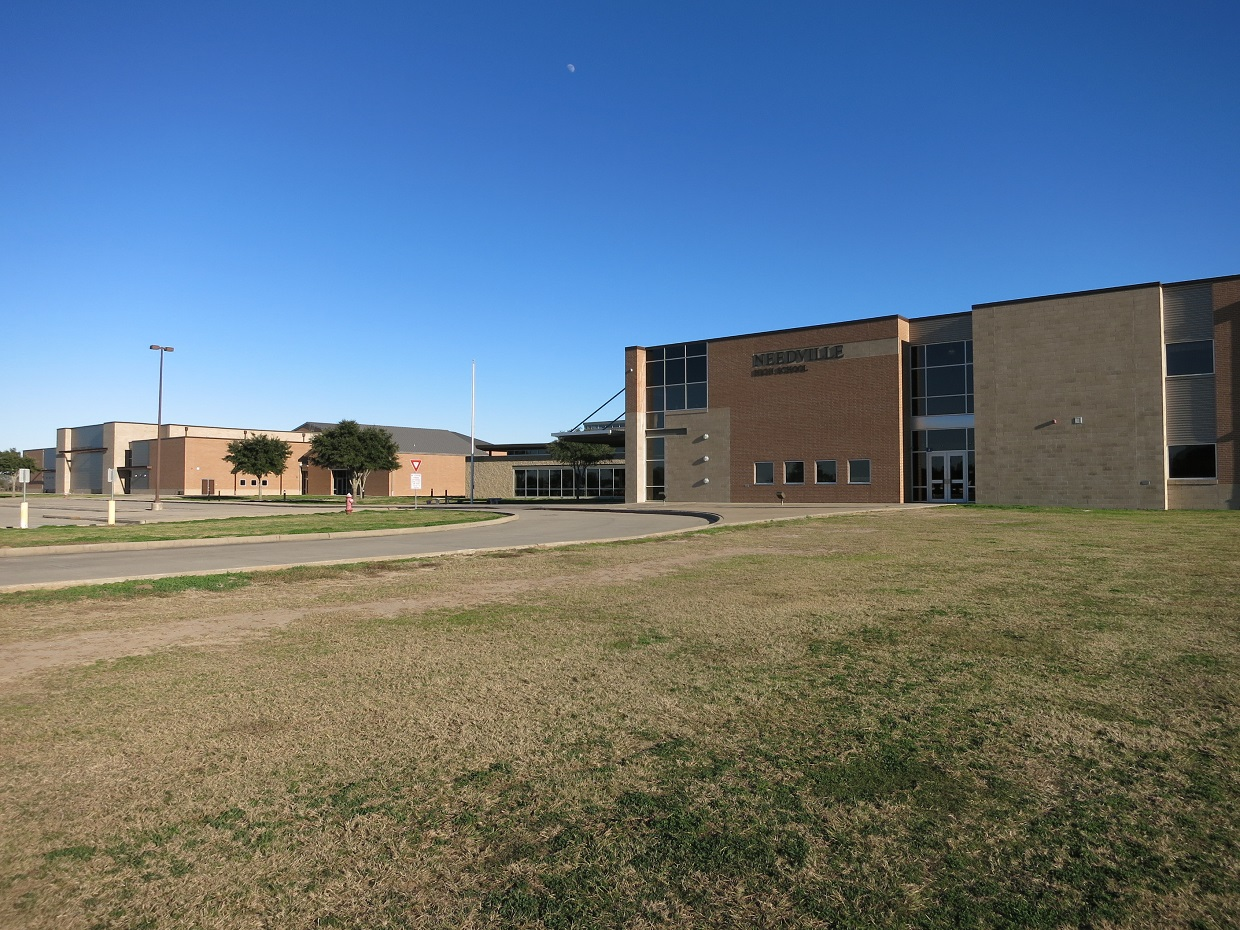

Location
- 16319 Highway 36 South; Fort Bend County 77461; United States; 29°22′15″N 95°48′09″W

Information
- School type: Public high school
- Motto: Committed to Educational Excellence
- Established: 1948
- School district: Needville Independent School District
- NCES District ID: 4832310
- Superintendent: Paul Drake
- CEEB code: 445030
- NCES School ID: 483231003584
- Principal: Steven Janacek
- Teaching staff: 80.38 (FTE)
- Grades: 9-12 (Formerly, Grades 7-12 from 1947 until before 1980)
- Enrollment: 1,120 (2023-2024)
  - Grade 9: 317
  - Grade 10: 293
  - Grade 11: 256
  - Grade 12: 254
- Student to teacher ratio: 13.93
- Campus type: Rural
- Colors: Royal Blue & White
- Athletics conference: UIL Class AAAA
- Nickname: Bluejays/Lady Jays
- Yearbook: Bluejay
- Website: www.needvilleisd.com/o/needville-high-school

Needville High School is a public high school located in unincorporated Fort Bend County, Texas (with a Needville postal address) and a part of the Needville Independent School District. It is classified as a 4A school by the UIL. The school serves residents of Needville, Fairchilds, a portion of Pleak, and the unincorporated communities of Guy and Long Point. In 2015, the school was rated "Met Standard" by the Texas Education Agency.

Students in grades 9-12 from the neighboring Damon Independent School District also attended Needville High School prior to the opening of Damon High School. Damon ISD signed a contract with Needville ISD in 1949 so Damon ISD residents could go to school at Needville High.

== Athletics ==
The Needville Blue Jays compete in Volleyball, Cross Country, Football, Basketball, Powerlifting, Golf, Tennis, Track, Baseball & Softball, Interior Design, and Exterior Design.

=== State titles ===
- Softball
  - 2009(3A)
- Boys Track
  - 1979(2A), 1980(2A)
- Volleyball
  - 1975(2A), 1976(2A), 1977(2A), 1992(3A), 2017(4A)

== History ==
=== The Establishment of the School ===
Needville High School's origins trace back to December 17, 1946, when community leaders, including county commissioners Otto Graeber and Louis Teykl, converged to form the Needville Rural High School District. This newly established district, encompassing approximately 200 square miles, brought together students from various smaller, pre-existing schools such as Big Creek, Marlow, Guy, Brown, Forester, Seiler, Modena, Williams, Long Point, and Concord. The primary objective was to construct a central high school in Needville.

The school's foundational administrative body, a board of educators, held its inaugural meeting on January 9, 1947. They engaged Rudolph G. Schneider, an architect from Houston, to design the new facility. Funding for this ambitious project was secured through a combination of the Value Tax and the School Tax. The construction phase lasted approximately a year and a half.

The building featured a pier and beam foundation made of yellow and white pine. Its exterior walls were built with vanilla clay fiber bricks, topped with white pine crown molding engraved with Art Deco designs. Inside, the pine walls included Grade 2 wainscoting coated in pine stain and lacquer. The roof was constructed with trusses, three-and-three-quarter-inch-thick plywood, tarpaper, and plain shingles. Despite its architectural features, the building lacked air conditioning and a heating system. However, it had two 100-foot-deep water wells and an extensive electrical system with 14 gauges, two breakers (one in the gymnasium), a load center in the kitchen, a fully functional public address (P/A) system, and Romex wiring coated in wax and plastic. The school housed approximately 23 rooms, each with a specific purpose.

In 1948, a significant step in establishing the school's identity occurred when Tarver Snedecor and Principal W.R. Womack collaborated to select the Blue Jay as the school mascot and white and royal blue as its official colors.

=== Leadership ===
James L. Boone, notable for his involvement in organizing the Needville Youth Fair, presided over the Needville School District from 1948 to 1950. He was succeeded by Mr. Ludwig, who later received assistance from Mr. Harrison. Both Mr. Ludwig and Mr. Harrison remained in their leadership roles until their retirement in the 1980s.

=== Challenges and Expansion ===
A major incident occurred in the fall of 1976 when a fire, caused by an electrical short, consumed the gymnasium during a district championship game. The wooden structure of the gym contributed to the rapid spread of the fire. In the aftermath, the school undertook the construction of a new gymnasium and a new cafeteria. Over the subsequent two to three decades, the campus underwent considerable expansion, with the addition of new facilities like a science wing and a new band hall, which replaced the old two-room Brown School building.

Mr. Sage assumed the role of superintendent in 1981. His tenure saw the acquisition of a radio tower for educational programming and the creation of a school website for teachers. Mr. Gazaway served as superintendent from 2002 to 2006, followed by Mr. Rhodes. However, the school's trajectory was drastically altered by a tragic event on April 24, 2007.

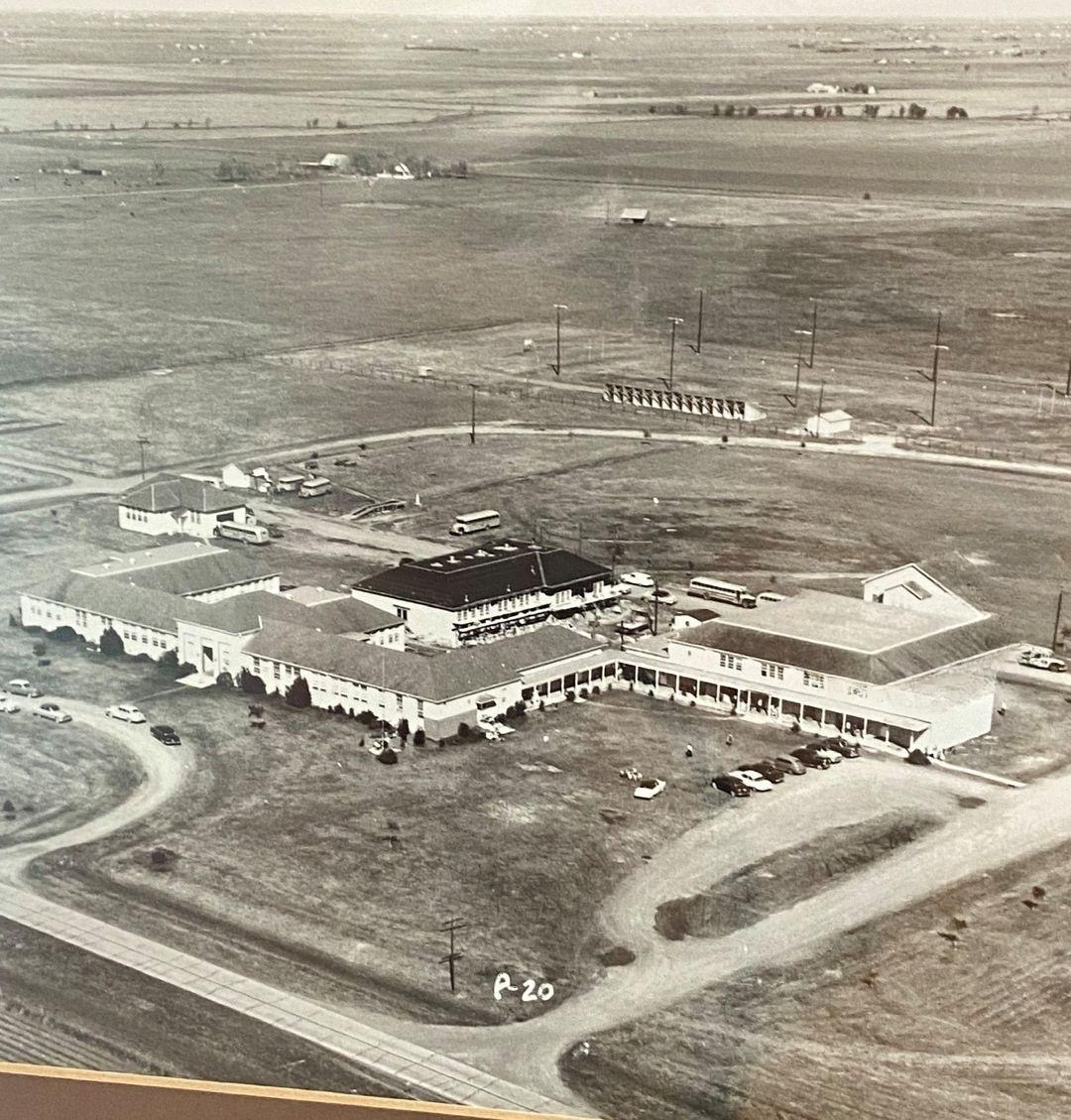
An aerial photograph of the school. Circa 1950.

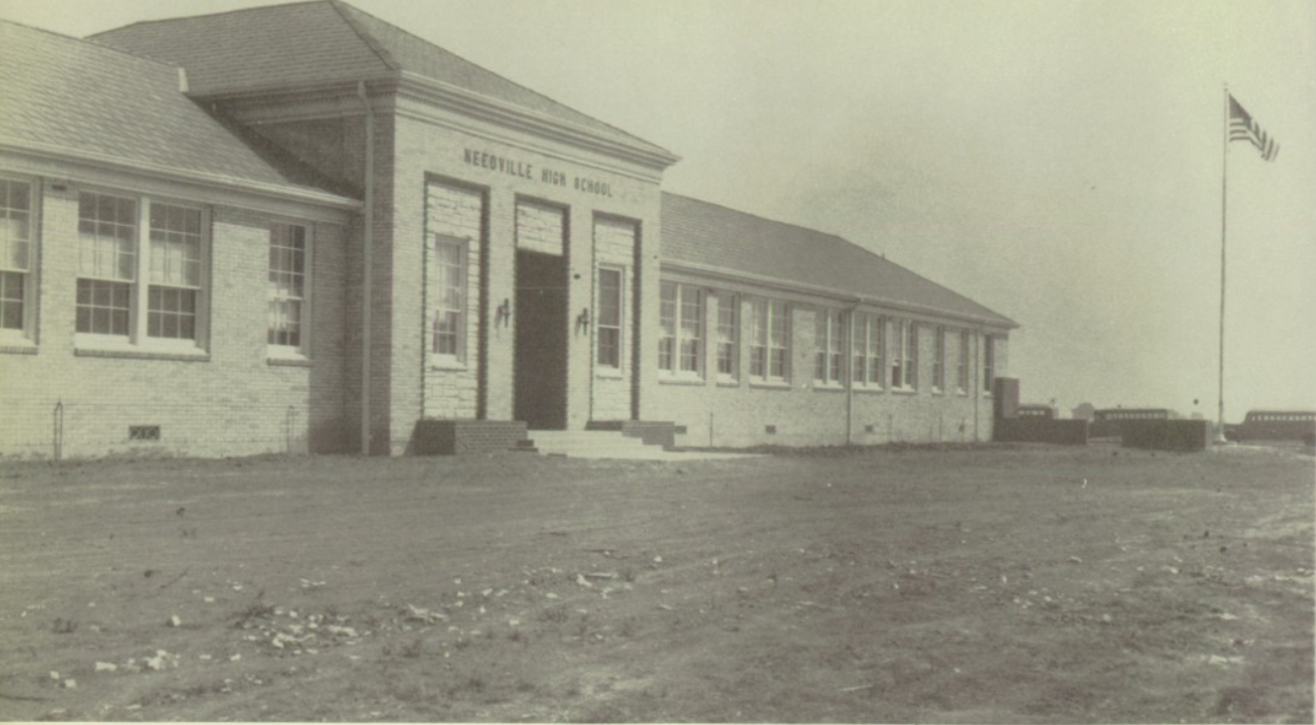
The School just after completion. The architect of the building was Rudolph Schneider. Circa 1948.

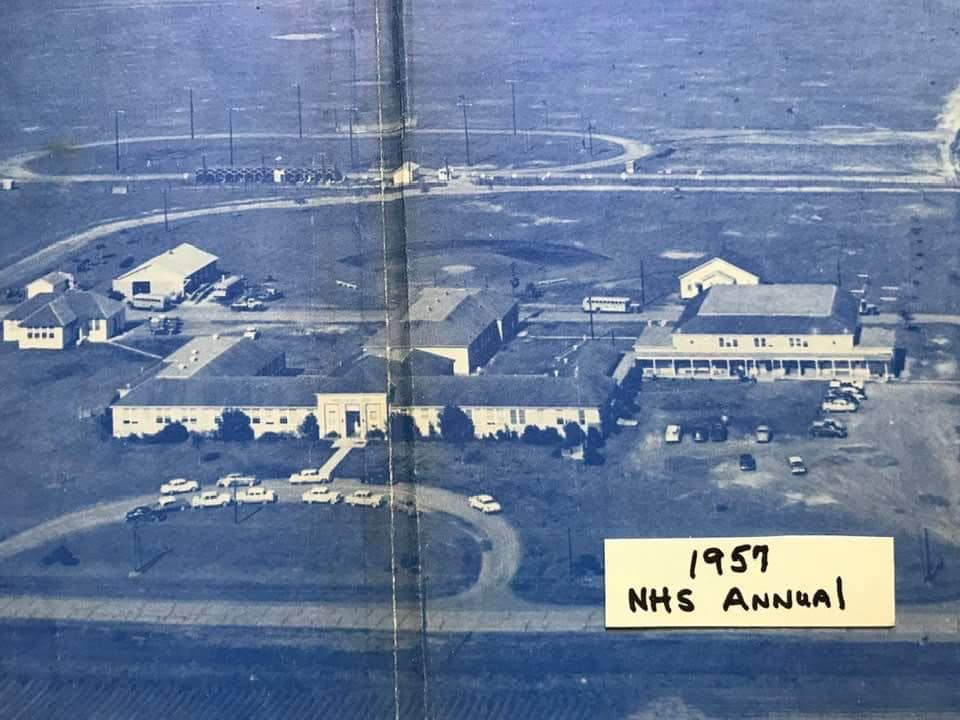
Another aerial photograph of the school. Circa 1957.

=== 2007 fire ===
The original Needville High School building was reported on fire at around 3:45 AM on April 24, 2007. 21 area fire departments responded but by 6:00 AM the building was still a fireball. As of 7:00 PM, the 1937 building was reduced to smoldering rubble with fire fighters and investigators still at the scene along with spectators. One computer lab, two mobile computer labs, three copiers, one Coke machine, and TAKS tests taken last week were lost to the fire.

The fire came in the wake of a $60 million bond issue, $49 million of which was earmarked for a new high school.

(sources:)

=== 2018 Stoneman Douglas walkout suspensions ===
In the aftermath of the Stoneman Douglas High School shooting, the school received backlash after superintendent Curtis Rhodes threatened to suspend students who participated in walk out protests. The school's Facebook page was subsequently taken down.

=== 2020 mask incident ===
After the George Floyd protests of 2020, a student was asked to remove their "BLM Mask" as it could cause conflict with fellow pupils. However, this was not enforced for students who wore masks with messages in support of Presidential Candidate Donald Trump. Eventually, the school revised this ban to apply to all political messages, with only plain masks (surgical or cloth), or masks with the US flag, Texas flag, or the Needville High School logo.

== Administration ==
- Principal: Steve Adamson
- Assistant Principals: Kristin Wyatt (9-10), Derek Maresh (11-12) & Heather Cordova (CTE Advisor)
- Librarians: Paula Vecera and Brenda Mahlmann
- FFA Advisors: Cameron Anderson, Stephanie Poe, Rebecca Raymond & Marc Hackstedt
