= Guy, Texas =

- Unincorporated community
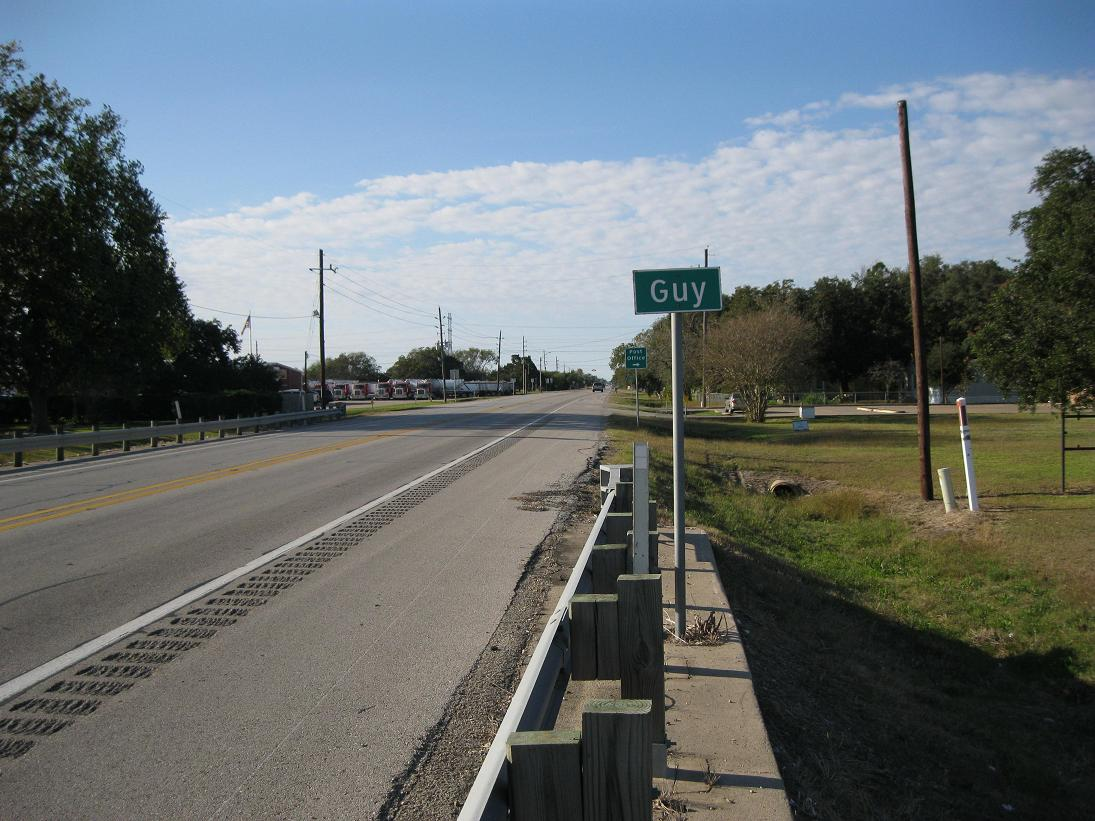
- View is northwest on Highway 36 toward the intersection with FM 1994.

- Location within Texas Location within the United States
- Coordinates: 29°20′39″N 95°46′59″W
- Country: United States
- State: Texas
- County: Fort Bend
- Elevation: 75 ft (23 m)
- Time zone: UTC-6 (Central (CST))
  - Summer (DST): UTC-5 (CDT)
- ZIP code: 77444
- Area code: 979

Guy is an unincorporated community in Fort Bend County, Texas, United States. According to the Handbook of Texas, the community had a population of 60 in 2000. It is located in the Greater Houston metropolitan area.

== History ==
The first Anglo settler in the area was Philip F. Ward, in 1890. He was followed within the next four years by S. A. Beard, R. V. Board, J. G. and Frank Goth, H. Hoelewyn, R. G. Hughes, Dr. William Lowry, Sr., and Louis Wolf. A post office was established in 1898 and named for Una Guy Rowland, the disabled daughter of the first postmaster, Orr Rowland. The 1900 Galveston Hurricane caused widespread damage. The Galveston, Harrisburg and San Antonio Railway extended a line south through Guy in 1918. The local businesses moved 2 miles (3.2 km) southwest from their former location to the railroad line. The old town site became known as Old Guy and was where a dance hall was located. In 1922, the settlement boasted a cotton gin, a garage, and a general store with a post office. In 1932, Texas State Highway 36 was built. Since the new road passed between Guy and Old Guy, the businesses and post office relocated northeast to the highway. The old dance hall was moved southwest to SH 36. At this time many residents worked in Damon to the south where oil, sulfur, and limestone were extracted from the Damon Mound salt dome, which is five miles away. In 1940, Guy's population reached 200. The community's population went into a slow decline from 150 in 1945 to 100 in 1966. By 1972, only 25 persons lived in Guy. In 1980, the dance hall was purchased by the George Foundation and moved to the George Ranch, headquartered near Richmond. The 1980s also saw the discontinuation of rail service. In the 1990s, the local population stabilized at approximately 60. Guy had 13 businesses in 2000, including a trucking firm, a convenience store, a new post office building, and a tavern/cafe. Its population was estimated at 239 in 2014.

== Geography ==
Guy is located at the intersection of Texas State Highway 36 and Farm to Market Road 1994, 18 mi (29 km) south of Richmond, 16 mi (26 km) south of Rosenberg, and 2 mi (3.2 km) southeast of Needville in Fort Bend County.

== Politics ==
According to unofficial returns, Precinct 1068 located in Guy had the distinction of having the highest percentage (90.5%) of votes for Mitt Romney of any Fort Bend County precinct in the 2012 election. Romney captured 238 votes for president while 25 residents voted for Barack Obama.

== Education ==
A large influx of farmers into the area caused the first local school to be opened in 1897. It then moved closer to the railroad. By 1922, there were 82 white and four black children in two segregated schools. In 1946, the Guy School consolidated with the Needville Independent School District and by 1949 the Guy School closed.

Guy is located in the Needville Independent School District. Needville High School serves the community.

== Notable person ==
- Dakota Palmer, left-hand pitcher for the 2021 Sam Houston State Bearkats baseball team.

== Gallery ==
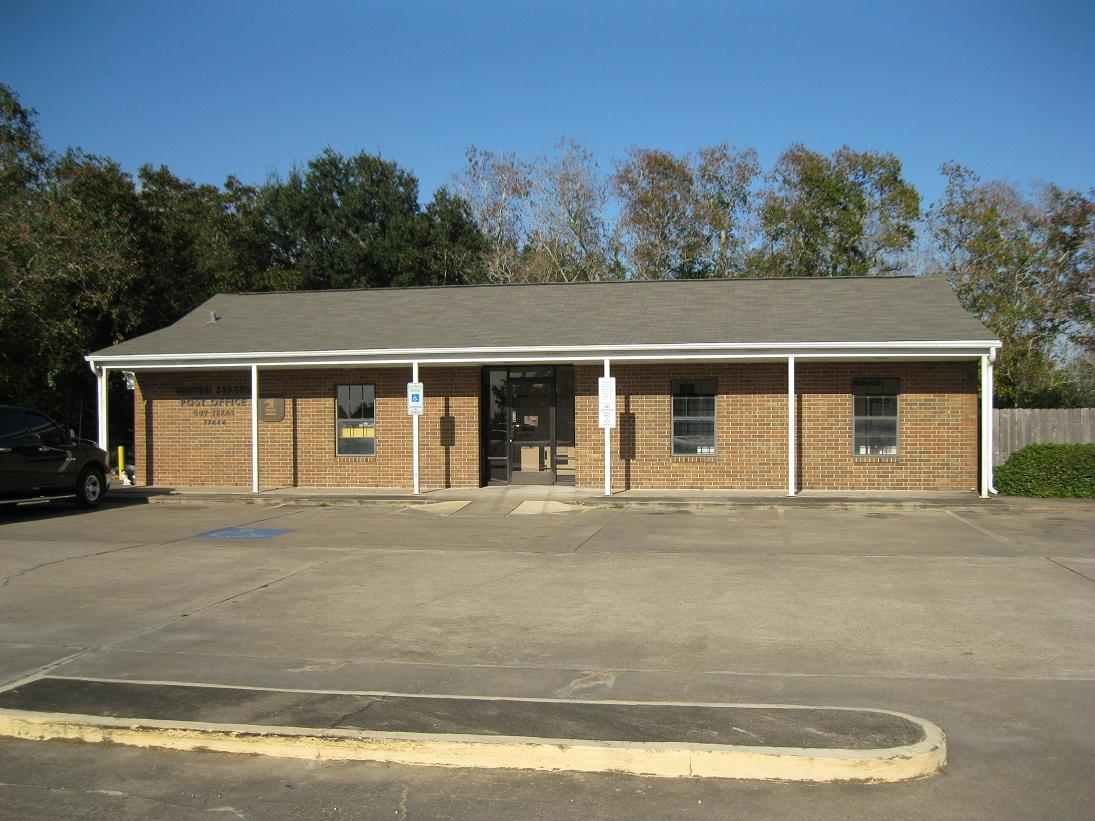
US Post Office on Highway 36

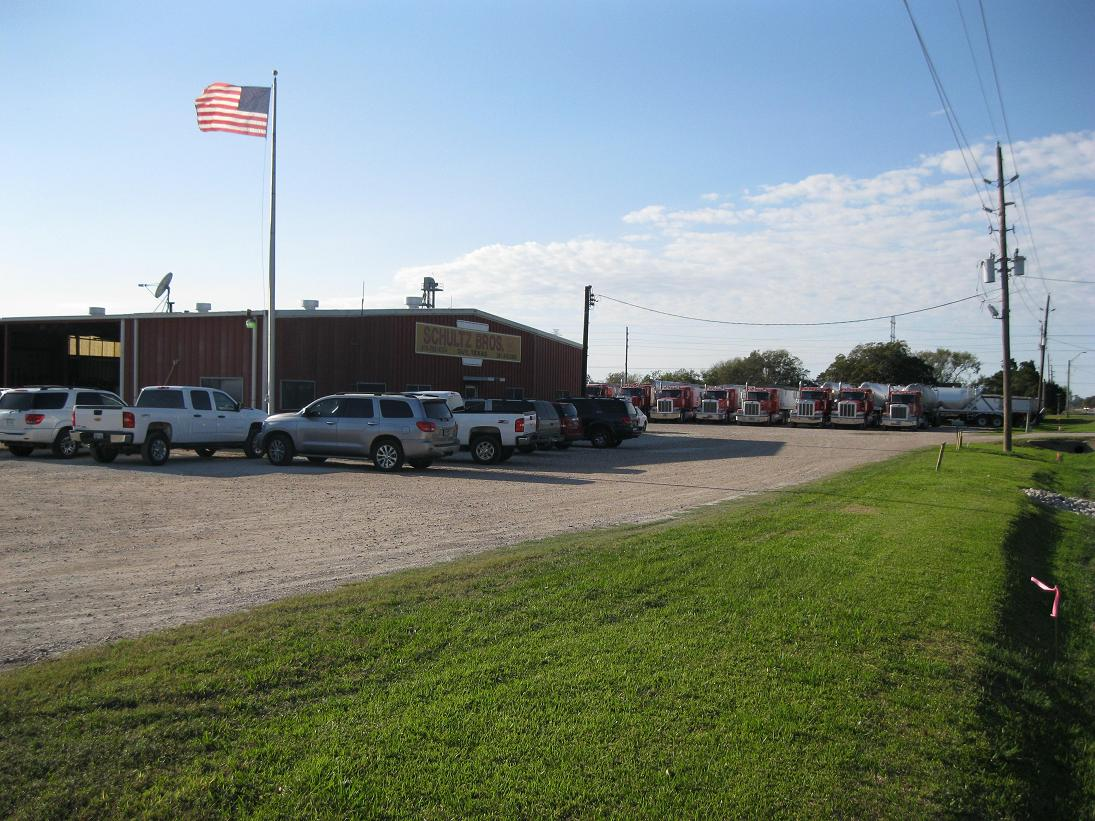
Schultz Bros. Trucking company at Hwy 36 and FM 1994

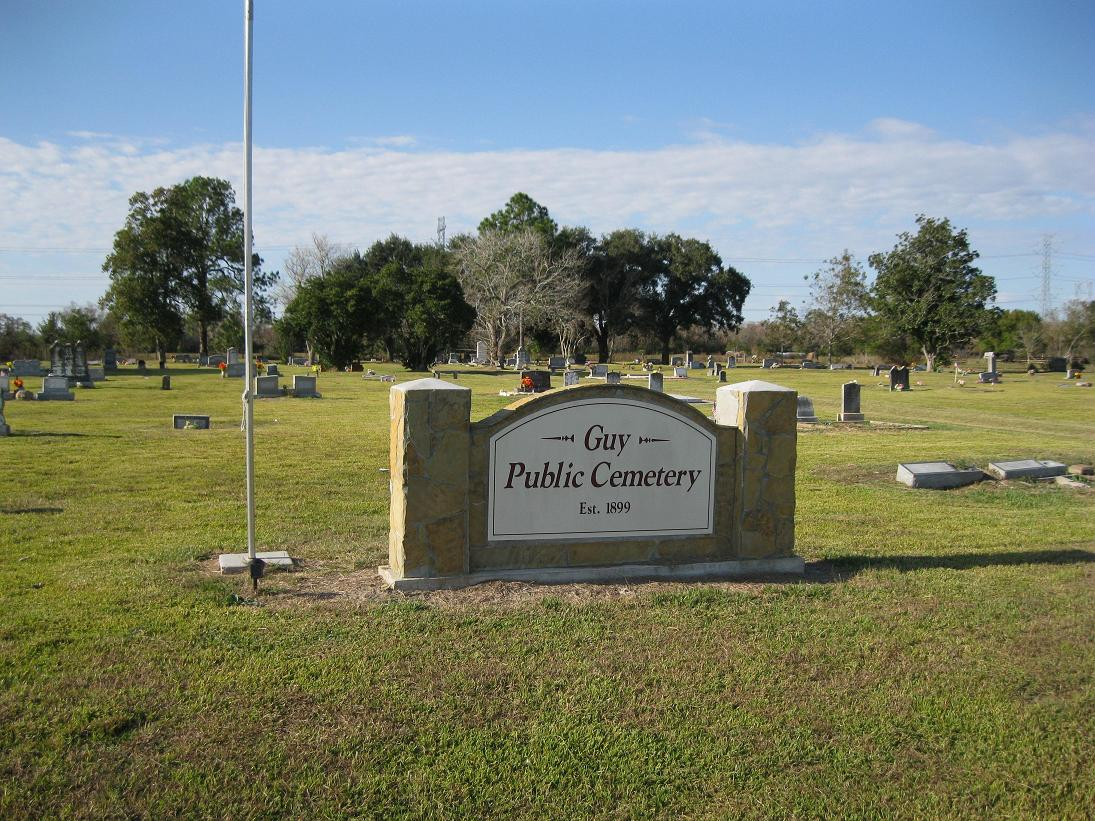
Guy Public Cemetery on FM 1994
