= Lowell Damon House =

Historic house in Wisconsin, United States

- U.S. National Register of Historic Places
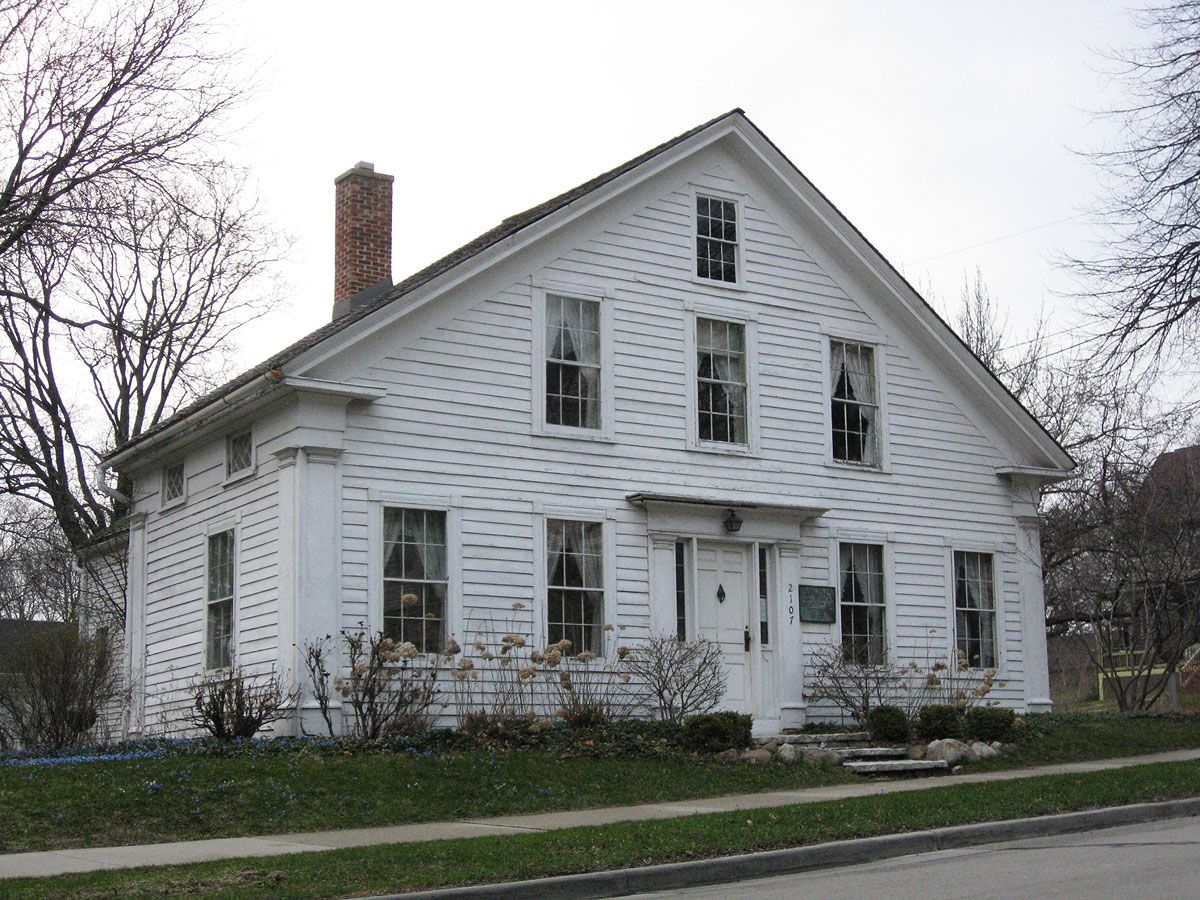

- Location within Wisconsin Location within the United States
- Interactive map showing the location of Lowell Damon House
- Location: 2107 Wauwatosa Ave. Wauwatosa, Wisconsin
- Coordinates: 43°3′26″N 88°0′27″W
- Built: 1844, 1846
- Architectural style: Colonial, Greek Revival
- NRHP reference No.: 72000061
- Added to NRHP: February 23, 1972

The Lowell Damon House is a historic house located at 2107 Wauwatosa Avenue in Wauwatosa, Wisconsin built from 1844 to 1846, displaying a design unusual for Wisconsin. It was added to the National Register of Historic Places on February 23, 1972.

== Description and history ==
Oliver Damon was a carpenter and wheelwright who came to Wauwatosa from Fitzwilliam, New Hampshire in 1844. In that year he built the simple ell wing in the back of the house, using wood from the nearby forest. The 1935 HABS survey describes: "Some of the young saplings were simply squared on one side and used as rafters and joists. Others were hewn and squared with an adze, and the tool marks are still to be seen on many a piece of timber in the old house. Much of this timbering is of oak and black walnut." This start date makes it the oldest surviving home in Wauwatosa.

With Oliver were his son-in-law, Jonathon Warren and other family. By 1846, Oliver and/or his son Lowell had added the stylish 1.5-story front section. The broad front and 1-room depth are unusual for Wisconsin - perhaps a form the Damons knew from New England. The shape of the building could be considered Colonial style, along with the front door with its symmetry and sidelights. Greek Revival style could provide the pilasters on the front corners, the cornice returns, and the frieze boards. The diamond-paned frieze windows on the side walls are an uncommon touch.

By 1935, the fine house had fallen into disrepair. The HABS surveyor mourned, "...because it is a derelict of the past, a tumble-down structure in need of paint, because the brass knocker that once graced the front door is but a memory and its sill is worn by the tread of countless feet, it is neglected by the passer-by. The average citizen of Wauwatosa is not alive to the fact that here is an example of the purest type of architecture extant. Today (1935) the house is hardly habitable. It has outlived its usefulness as a human habitation. It is almost ready for the hand of the wrecker."

Instead of succumbing to the wrecker, the house was given to the Milwaukee County Historical Society by the sons of Alexander Rogers, a later owner. The historical society restored it, and today operates it as a museum.

In 2020 due to the costs of upkeep the Milwaukee County Historical Society sold the property to private owners. It is no longer a museum. https://www.milwaukeemag.com/oldest-home-wauwatosa-now-new-owners/
