= Damon (surname) =

Damon is a surname. Notable people with the surname include:

- Cathryn Damon (1930–1987), American television, film and stage actress
- Fannie B. Damon (1857–1939), American writer, magazine editor
- Gabriel Damon (born 1976), American film actor
- Johnny Damon (born 1973), American Major League baseball player
- Liz Damon, lead singer of Liz Damon's Orient Express
- Mark Damon (1933–2024), American film actor and producer
- Matt Damon (born 1970), American film actor and screenwriter
- Robert Damon (1814–1889), English conchologist and geologist
- S. Foster Damon (1893–1971), American academic and poet
- William Damon (born 1944), psychologist and educator
- William Damon, or William Daman (died 1591), musician in England
