= Damon, Missouri =

Extinct hamlet in Missouri, U.S.

Coordinates: 37°10′37″N 90°36′38″W

Damon is an extinct town in Wayne County, in the U.S. state of Missouri. The GNIS classifies it as a populated place.

A post office called Damon was established in 1893, and remained in operation until 1903. The community has the name of Damon Taylor, a local merchant.
