= Lake Damon =

Lake in the state of Florida, United States

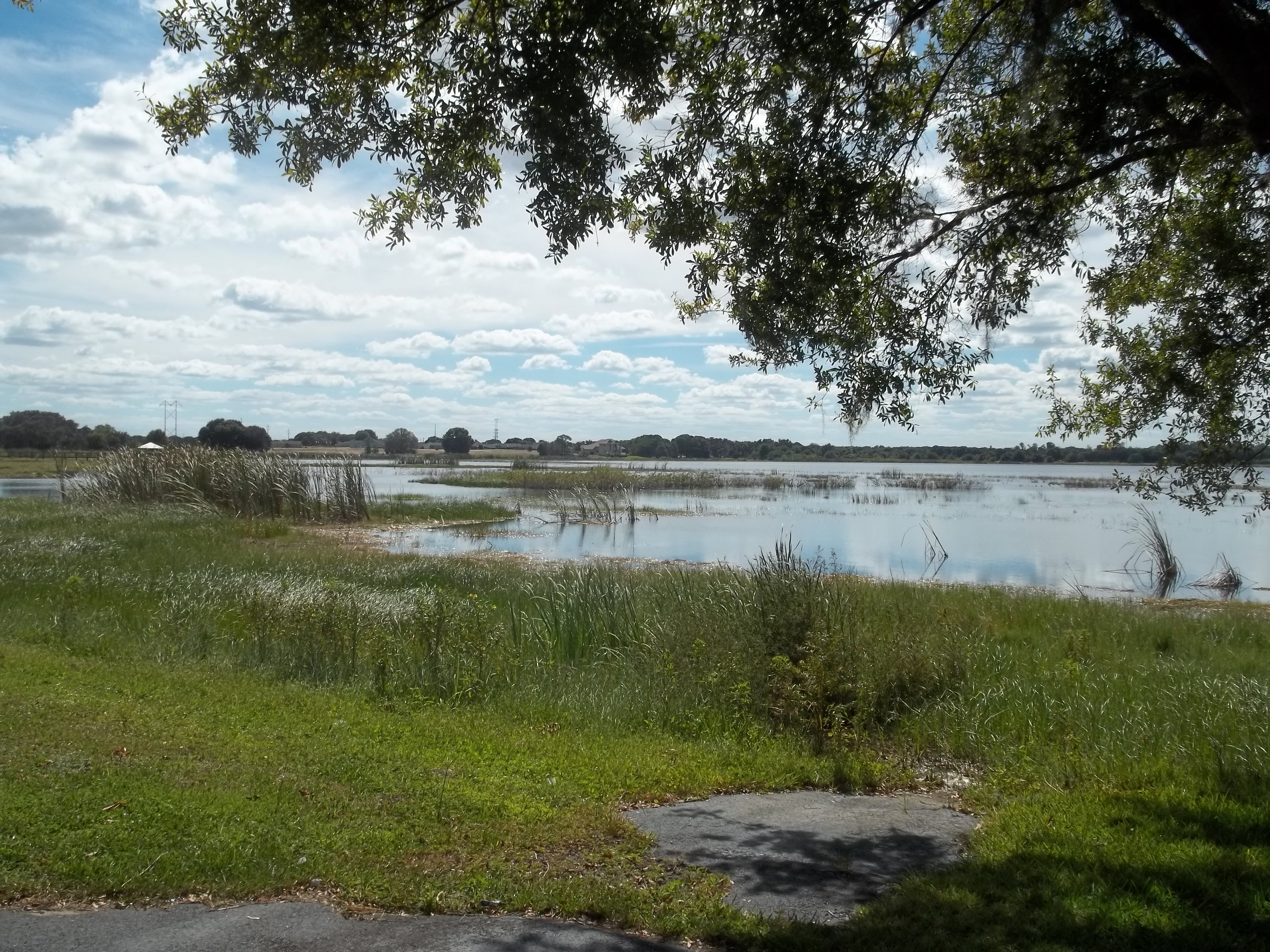

- Location within Florida
- Location: Highlands County, Florida, United States
- Coordinates: 27°37′59″N 81°30′34″W
- Surface area: 282 acres (1.14 km^{2})
- Max. depth: 15 ft (4.6 m)
- Settlements: Avon Park, Florida

Lake Damon is a natural circular lake in northwest Highlands County, Florida. It is about three-fourths of a mile across, covers 282 acres (1.14 km^{2}) and has a maximum depth of 15 feet (4.6 m). The lake is bounded on the south by the city limits of the city of Avon Park, Florida, on the west by a railroad and US 27 and on the north by a housing development and the River Greens Golf Course. About a block to the east is Lake Pythias.

Lake Damon is used for fishing and boating. There is a public boat ramp located on the west side of the lake, off a road leading to US 27.
