= Washington Damon House =

Historic house in Massachusetts, United States

- U.S. National Register of Historic Places
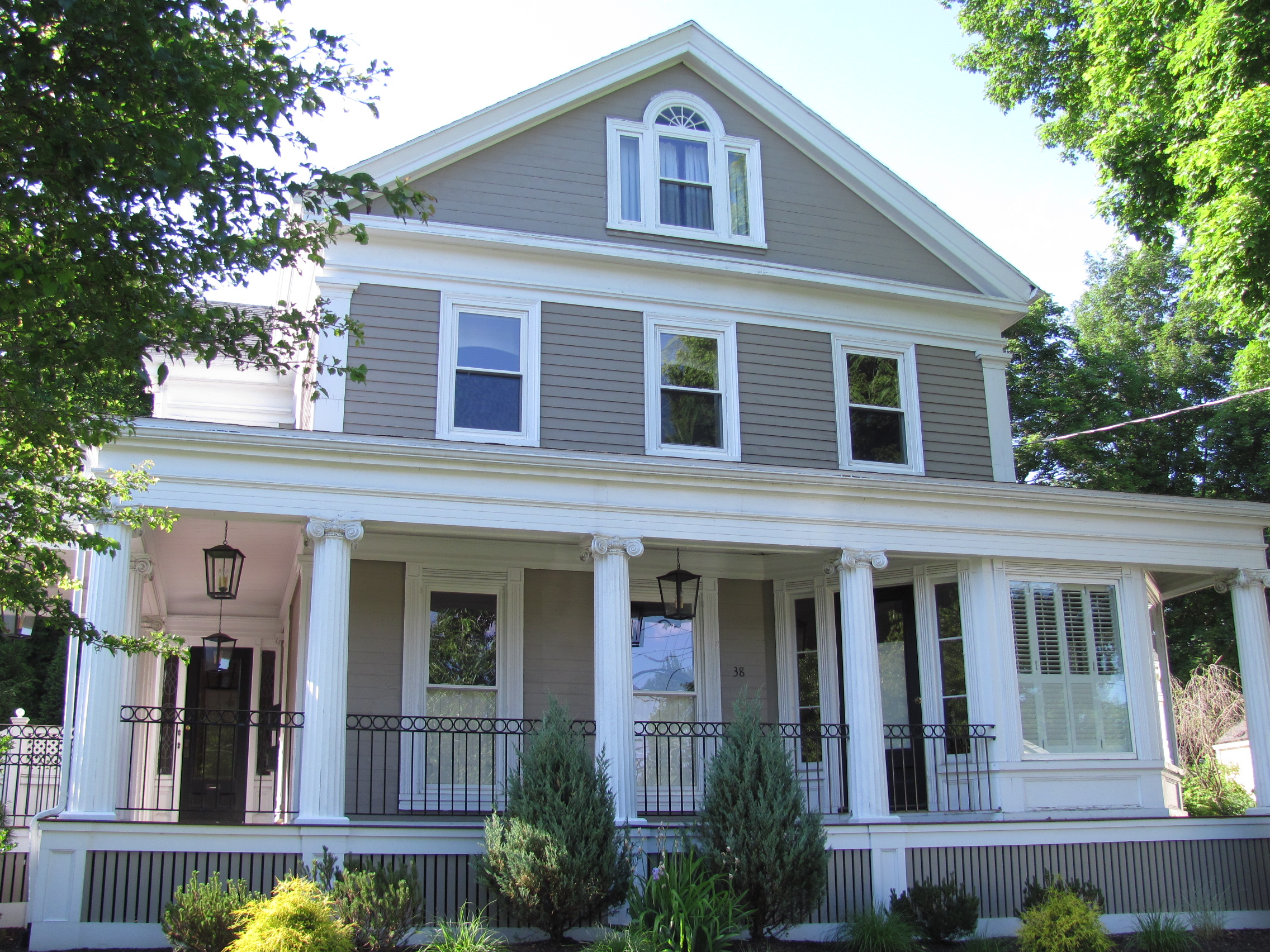
- Washington Damon House

- Location within Massachusetts Location within the United States
- Location: 38 Salem Street, Reading, Massachusetts
- Coordinates: 42°31′35″N 71°6′5″W
- Built: 1839
- Architectural style: Greek Revival
- MPS: Reading MRA
- NRHP reference No.: 84002560
- Added to NRHP: July 19, 1984

The Washington Damon House is a historic house in Reading, Massachusetts, exhibiting the adaptation of existing housing stock to new architectural style. The 2 1/2-story wood-frame house was built in 1839, and was at the time a fairly conventional side hall Greek Revival house, although it has small wings on either side that also appear date to that period. It was significantly renovated in 1906, when the wraparound porch was added, as was the Palladian window in the front gable end. When made, these additions included Greek Revival elements that were sensitive to those already present on the structure.

The house was listed on the National Register of Historic Places in 1984.

== See also ==
- National Register of Historic Places listings in Reading, Massachusetts
- National Register of Historic Places listings in Middlesex County, Massachusetts
