= Parker House =

Parker House may refer to:

== Buildings ==
=== Canada ===
- Parker Octagon House or the James Parker Octagon House in Niagara Falls, Ontario is the Bradley Octagon House

=== United States ===
==== Alabama ====
- Parker–Reynolds House, Anniston, Alabama, listed on the National Register of Historic Places (NRHP) in Calhoun County

==== Arkansas ====
- Womack–Parker House, Nashville, Arkansas, NRHP-listed
- Parker House (Star City, Arkansas), NRHP-listed

==== California ====
- Parker House (Orange, California), listed on the NRHP in Orange County

==== Connecticut ====
- Samuel Parker House, Coventry, Connecticut, of Parker-Hutchinson Farm, NRHP-listed
- Parker House (Old Saybrook, Connecticut), NRHP-listed

==== Georgia ====
- Aaron and Margaret Parker Jr. House, Stockbridge, Georgia listed on the NRHP in Rockdale County

==== Hawaii ====
- James and Catherine Parker House, Hilo, Hawaii, listed on the NRHP in Hawaii County

==== Idaho ====
- John Parker House (Boise, Idaho), listed on the NRHP in Ada County

==== Illinois ====
- Parker House (Oak Park, Illinois)

==== Iowa ====
- Parker House (Guttenberg, Iowa), NRHP-listed

==== Kansas ====
- Martin Van Buren Parker House, Olathe, Kansas, listed on the NRHP in Johnson County

==== Kentucky ====
- Southgate–Parker–Maddux House, Newport, Kentucky, listed on the NRHP in Campbell County
- Richard Parker House, Petersburg, Kentucky, listed on the NRHP in Boone County
- Parker House (Somerset, Kentucky), listed on the NRHP in Pulaski County

==== Maine ====
- Parker House (Blue Hill, Maine), NRHP-listed

==== Massachusetts ====
- Parker House Hotel, Boston, Massachusetts, now known as the Omni Parker House
- Parker House (Haven Street, Reading, Massachusetts), NRHP-listed
- Parker House (Salem Street, Reading, Massachusetts), NRHP-listed
- Joseph Parker House, Reading, Massachusetts, NRHP-listed
- Capt. Nathaniel Parker Red House, Reading, Massachusetts, NRHP-listed
- Samuel Parker House (Reading, Massachusetts), NRHP-listed
- Stillman Parker House, Reading, Massachusetts, NRHP-listed
- William Parker House, Reading, Massachusetts, NRHP-listed
- Parker Tavern, Reading, Massachusetts, NRHP-listed
- James Parker House, Shirley, Massachusetts, NRHP-listed
- Parker–Burnett House, Somerville, Massachusetts, NRHP-listed
- Parker House (Winchester, Massachusetts), NRHP-listed
- Edmund Parker Jr. House, Winchester, Massachusetts, NRHP-listed
- Harrison Parker Sr. House, Winchester, Massachusetts, NRHP-listed

==== Michigan ====
- Thomas A. Parker House, Detroit, Michigan, listed on the NRHP in Wayne County
- Arthur M. Parker House, Detroit, Michigan, listed on the NRHP in Wayne County

==== Minnesota ====
- Charles and Grace Parker House, Minneapolis, Minnesota, NRHP-listed

==== Missouri ====
- Lester S. and Missouri "Zue" Gordon Parker House, Jefferson City, Missouri, NRHP-listed

==== New Jersey ====
- John Parker Tavern, Bernardsville, New Jersey, NRHP-listed
- Parker Homestead, Little Silver, New Jersey, NRHP-listed
- Parker House (Sea Girt, New Jersey), a bar/nightclub and former hotel

==== New York ====
- Charles Parker House, Guilderland, New York, listed on the NRHP in Albany County
- Leech–Parker Farmhouse, Lima, New York, NRHP-listed
- Charlie Parker Residence, New York, New York, NRHP-listed

==== North Carolina ====
- Royal–Crumpler–Parker House, Clinton, North Carolina, NRHP-listed
- James H. Parker House, Enfield, North Carolina, NRHP-listed
- Francis Parker House, Murfreesboro, North Carolina, NRHP-listed
- King Parker House, Winton, North Carolina, NRHP-listed

==== Ohio ====
- John P. Parker House, Ripley, Ohio, a U.S. National Historic Landmark

==== Oklahoma ====
- Quanah Parker Star House, Cache, Oklahoma, NRHP-listed

==== Oregon ====
- Moses Parker House, Albany, Oregon, listed on the NRHP in Linn County
- Roe–Parker House, Hood River, Oregon, NRHP-listed

==== Texas ====
- James F. and Susie R. Parker House, Austin, Texas, listed on the NRHP in Travis County
- Milton Parker House, Bryan, Texas, listed on the NRHP in Brazos County
- John W. Parker House, Houston, Texas, listed on the NRHP in Harris County
- Parker–Bradshaw House, Lufkin, Texas, listed on the NRHP in Angelina County

==== Utah ====
- Joseph William Parker Farm, Joseph, Utah, listed on the NRHP in Sevier County

==== West Virginia ====
- Sloan–Parker House, Junction, West Virginia, listed on the NRHP in Hampshire County

== Food and drink brands ==
- Parker House roll, a type of bread roll created at the Parker House hotel in Boston
- Parker House Sausage Company, meat company in Chicago, Illinois

== See also ==
- John Parker House (disambiguation)
- Samuel Parker House (disambiguation)
- Parker Building (disambiguation)
