= John Parker House =

John Parker House may refer to:

in the United States

(by state)

- John Parker House (Boise, Idaho), listed on the NRHP in Idaho
- John Parker Tavern, in Bernardsville, New Jersey, listed on the NRHP in New Jersey
- John P. Parker House in Ripley, Ohio, a U.S. National Historic Landmark
- John W. Parker House, in Houston, Texas, listed on the NRHP in Texas

== See also ==
- Parker House (disambiguation)
