= Hortense Parker =

Hortense Parker Gilliam, born Hortense Parker (1859–1938), was the first known African-American graduate of Mount Holyoke Female Seminary, in 1883. She taught music and piano at elementary school in Kansas City, Missouri from 1906 to 1913. That year she married James Marcus Gilliam, and moved with him to St. Louis, where she taught music and lived the rest of her life.

== Early life and education ==
Hortense Parker was the fourth of six children born to the free people of color John Parker and Miranda {Boulden} Parker in Ripley, Ohio. She had three older brothers and two sisters. Her mother was freeborn in Cincinnati. Born into slavery, her father had bought his freedom and became a noted abolitionist, inventor, and industrialist. Before the American Civil War, he aided hundreds of slaves to escape by the Underground Railroad. Her parents' house has been designated a National Historic Landmark and restored, now called the John P. Parker House after her father.

The Parkers ensured that all their children became well educated. Hortense Parker and her two younger sisters studied music as children, in addition to traditional subjects. Hortense went to Mount Holyoke Female Seminary (now Mount Holyoke College), where she graduated in 1883, the first known African-American graduate.

== Career ==
She worked in several cities teaching music, among them Kansas City, where Parker taught from 1906 to 1913 at Lincoln School (later W.W. Yates).

== Marriage and family ==
In 1913 Parker married James Marcus Gilliam, a graduate of Cornell University. They moved to St. Louis, where her brother Horatio Parker was living. There Gilliam served as a principal for most of his career. Parker Gilliam taught music for many years. She died on December 9, 1938.

== Legacy and honors ==
- As the first African-American graduate of Mt. Holyoke, Parker Gilliam was featured in Our Path: Students of Color at Mt. Holyoke at the 2007 Alumnae Student Conference there.
