= Samuel Parker House =

Samuel Parker House may refer to:

- Samuel Parker House, Coventry, Connecticut, of Parker-Hutchinson Farm, listed on the National Register of Historic Places, in Tolland County
- Samuel Parker House (Reading, Massachusetts), NRHP-listed, in Middlesex County

== See also ==
- Parker House (disambiguation)
