= Parker Barn =

Parker Barn, or Farmhouse or Farm or variations may refer to:

- Parker Farmhouse (Cazenovia, New York), listed on the National Register of Historic Places (NRHP)
- Parker 13-Sided Barn, Jefferson, New York, NRHP-listed
- Parker Training Academy Dutch Barn, Red Hook, New York, NRHP-listed

== See also ==
- Parker (disambiguation)
- Parker Building (disambiguation)
- Parker House (disambiguation)
