= Parker Building =

Parker Building, or variations, may refer to:

== Canada ==
- R. D. Parker Building, at Laurentian University in Toronto

== United Kingdom ==
- Parker's Buildings, Chester, England

== United States ==
- Parker Center, Los Angeles, California
- Imperial Granum-Joseph Parker Buildings, New Haven, Connecticut
- Parker Metal Decoration Company Plant, Baltimore, Maryland
- Parker Mill Complex, Ann Arbor, listed on the NRHP in Washtenaw County, Michigan
- Parker and Dunstan Hardware/Dr. E. D. Lewis Building, Otisville, listed on the NRHP in Genesee County, Michigan
- Parker Building (Brainerd, Minnesota)
- Parker's Store, Goffstown, New Hampshire
- Parker Building (New York City)
- Parker Masonic Hall, Parker, South Dakota
- Parker Lumber Company Complex, Bryan, listed on the NRHP in Brazos County, Texas
- Parker and Weeter Block, Price, Utah

== See also ==
- Parker (disambiguation)
- Parker Barn (disambiguation)
- Parker House (disambiguation)
