= Bernardsville, New Jersey =

Borough in Somerset County, New Jersey, US

- Borough
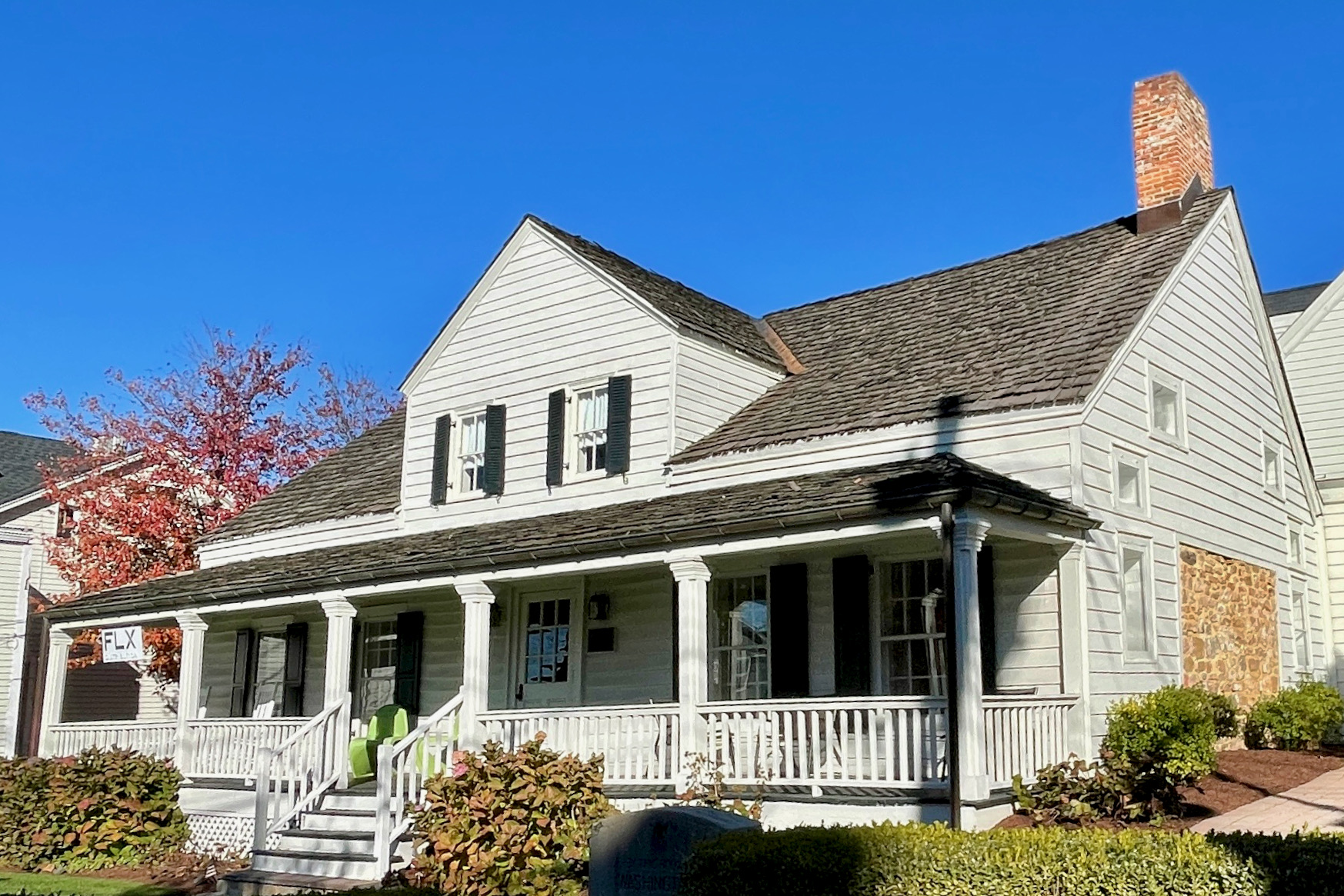
- John Parker Tavern

- logo

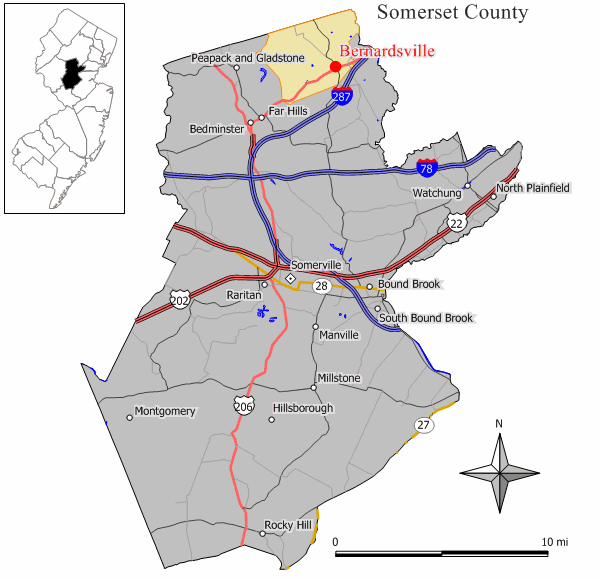
- Location of Bernardsville in Somerset County highlighted in yellow (right). Inset map: Location of Somerset County in New Jersey highlighted in black (left).

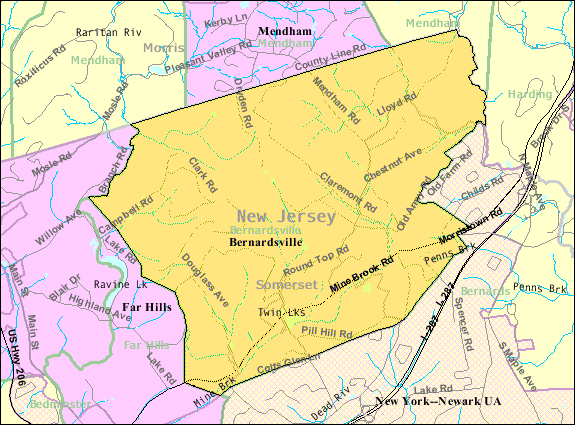
- Census Bureau map of Bernardsville, New Jersey

- Location in Somerset County Location in New Jersey Location in the United States
- Coordinates: 40.730384°N 74.592602°W
- Country: United States
- State: New Jersey
- County: Somerset
- Incorporated: April 29, 1924
- Named for: Sir Francis Bernard, 1st Baronet

Government
  - Type: Borough
  - Body: Borough Council
  - Mayor: Mary Jane Canose (R, term ends December 31, 2026)
  - Administrator: Nancy Malool
  - Municipal clerk: Anthony Suriano

Area
  - Total: 12.91 sq mi (33.44 km^{2})
  - Land: 12.83 sq mi (33.24 km^{2})
  - Water: 0.073 sq mi (0.19 km^{2}) 0.58%
  - Rank: 184th of 565 in state 9th of 21 in county
- Elevation: 682 ft (208 m)

Population (2020)
  - Total: 7,893
  - Estimate (2023): 7,837
  - Rank: 295th of 565 in state 13th of 21 in county
  - Density: 614.9/sq mi (237.4/km^{2})
  - Rank: 428th of 565 in state 18th of 21 in county
- Time zone: UTC−05:00 (Eastern (EST))
  - Summer (DST): UTC−04:00 (Eastern (EDT))
- ZIP Code: 07924
- Area code: 908
- FIPS code: 3403505590
- GNIS feature ID: 0885159
- Website: bernardsville.gov

Bernardsville (/ˈbɜːrnərdzvɪl/) is the northernmost borough in Somerset County, New Jersey, United States. Situated within the heart of the Raritan Valley and Somerset Hills regions, the borough is an historic and wealthy bedroom community of New York City in the New York metropolitan area. As of the 2020 United States census, the borough's population was 7,893, an increase of 186 (+2.4%) from the 2010 census count of 7,707, which in turn had reflected an increase of 362 (+4.9%) from the 7,345 counted at the 2000 census. Bernardsville is often mispronounced as "Ber-NARDS-ville" as opposed to the correct pronunciation, "BER-nards-ville".

Bernardsville was incorporated as a borough by an act of the New Jersey Legislature on March 6, 1924, from portions of Bernards Township, based on the results of a referendum held on April 29, 1924. The borough was named for Sir Francis Bernard, 1st Baronet, who served as governor of the Province of New Jersey before the Revolutionary War. In 2009, part of the borough was listed on the National Register of Historic Places as the Olcott Avenue Historic District.

In 2000, Bernardsville had the 10th-highest per capita income in New Jersey. Based on data from the 2006–2010 American Community Survey, the borough had a per-capita income of $70,141, ranked 27th in the state. In 2019, the borough was ranked by Bloomberg News as 64th of 100 on its 2019 list of Bloomberg Richest Places, one of 18 in the state included on the list.

== History ==
Bernardsville was originally a section of Bernards Township known as Vealtown. In 1840, Vealtown became Bernardsville, named after Sir Francis Bernard, Colonial governor of New Jersey from 1758 to 1760. Located in the northernmost part of Somerset County, just 12 miles (19 km) south of Morristown, the borough includes some of the last vestiges of the Great Eastern Forest.

During the Revolutionary War, General Charles Lee rested his troops in Vealtown around the night of December 12 to 13, 1776. General Lee and some of his guard spent the night about 3 miles (5 km) southeast at White's Inn on the southeast side of Basking Ridge, near the manor house of Continental Army general William Alexander, Lord Stirling. On the morning of December 13, General Lee was captured by the British and removed to New York. The Vealtown Tavern, later known as the John Parker Tavern, was a regular stop during the 1779–1780 winter encampment at Morristown.

After the Civil War, many wealthy and prominent New Yorkers moved into the area, first as summer visitors, then as permanent residents of the Bernardsville Mountain. For most, the men worked in New York City while the women and children spent summers in Bernardsville. The Gladstone Branch of the existing railroad line was built through Bernardsville in 1872 and played an important role in the borough's development. The Gladstone line, whose five o'clock train was appropriately nicknamed "the millionaire's special," as it was direct route to Penn Station, allowed the men who built grand estates in Bernardsville to commute to the city on a daily basis rather than only visit their families on weekends. Bernardsville did not become an independent municipality until 1924, when it split from Bernards Township.

In 1943, Henry F. Ruschmann who had invented a machine to cut glitter from plastics, bought the Meadowbrook Farm and established the first modern glitter factory, Meadowbrook Farm Inventions.

In November 2020, The Bernardsville Library announced that it would join the MAIN Library System, which has member libraries in all of Morris County, all of Hunterdon County and parts of Somerset and Warren counties. The Bernardsville Library is the second library from Somerset County to join the MAIN System, after the Bernards Township Library in neighboring Bernards Township. The library joined the MAIN System in January 2021.

=== Historic district ===
The New Jersey State Review Board for Historic Sites recommended the creation of the Olcott Avenue historic district on February 10, 2009. While the Olcott Avenue School is but one historic structure within Bernardsville's first historic district area, the area's appeal and historic significance is part of the story of the rise of the middle class in Bernardsville and how this particular location impacted the entire region, from the downtown, Little Italy, and the Mountain Colony areas.

- Olcott Avenue Historic District
- U.S. National Register of Historic Places
- U.S. Historic district
- New Jersey Register of Historic Places
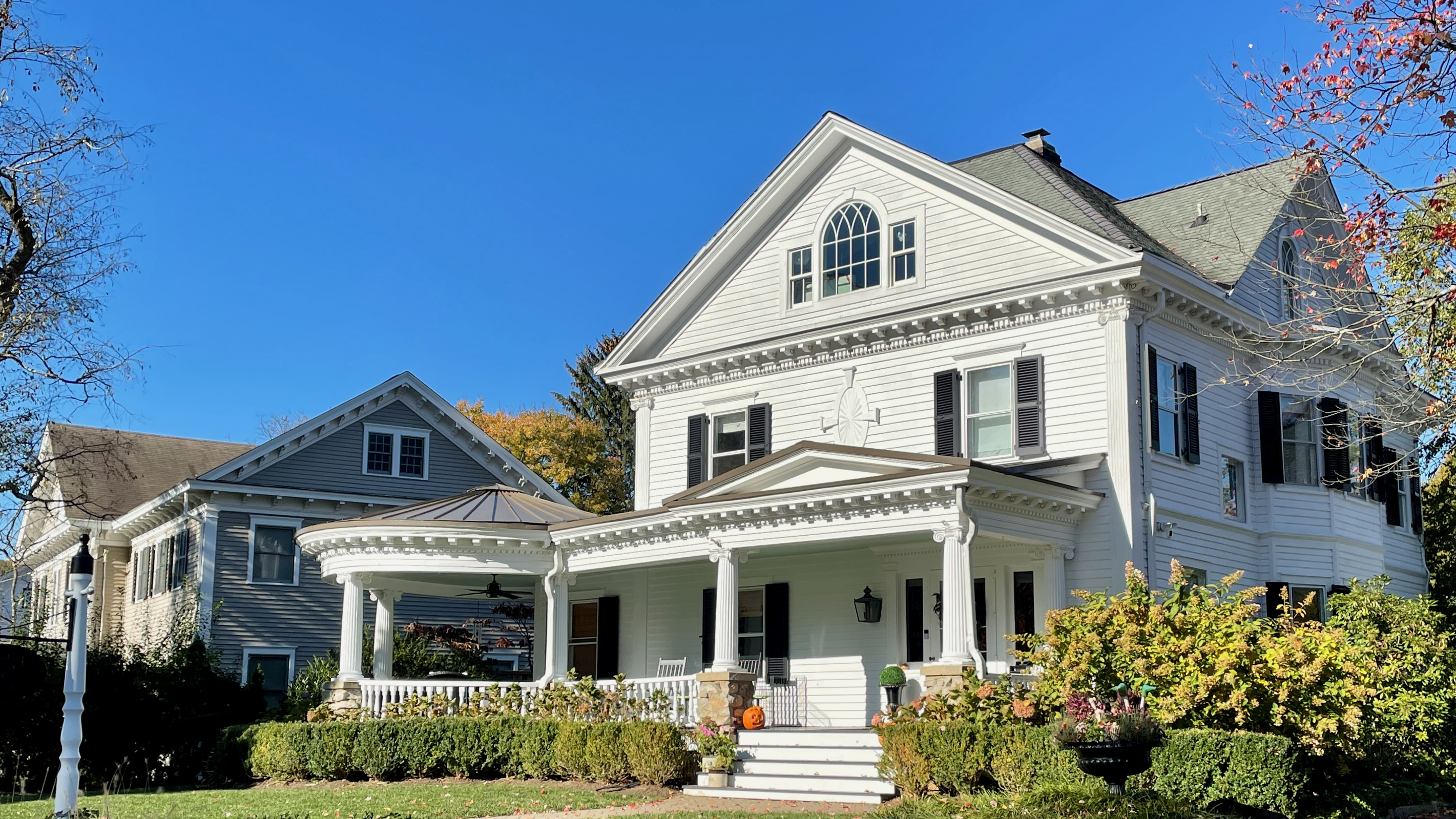
- Colonial Revival style house on Olcott Avenue
- Location: Portions of Olcott, Childsworth, and Highview Avenues, and Church Street
- Coordinates: 40°43′18″N 74°34′3″W
- Area: 28 acres (11 ha)
- Architect: Henry Janeway Hardenbergh
- Architectural style: Tudor Revival, Colonial Revival, Craftsman
- NRHP reference No.: 09000940
- NJRHP No.: 4896

Significant dates
- Added to NRHP: November 20, 2009
- Designated NJRHP: May 20, 2009

The Olcott Avenue Historic District is a 28-acre (11 ha) historic district located along portions of Olcott, Childsworth, and Highview Avenues, and Church Street that recognizes a neighborhood developed in the early 20th century. It was added to the National Register of Historic Places on November 20, 2009, for its significance in architecture, community planning and development, and education.

According to the National Park Service:

The Olcott Avenue neighborhood in the borough of Bernardsville, located in northeast Somerset County, was developed at the turn of the 20th century as a carefully laid out middle class residential neighborhood. The streets in the district are characterized by lots of moderate size with regular setbacks with moderate to substantial dwellings constructed in a variety of late 19th and early 20th century architectural styles, several of which are particularly noteworthy examples. The original dwellings constructed during the first three decades or so of the 20th century all still stand and the streetscape has changed relatively little since curbs and sidewalks were added and the road was paved around 1916. Residents of the district have continued the long tradition of participation in civic activities.

Olcott Avenue is named after Frederic P. Olcott, a New York banker, politician and philanthropist, who lived here. The street was originally named after Stewart Wolfe. In 1905, Olcott financed the construction of a high school, the first in the township, and donated it to the Bernards Township Board of Education. The stone building features Tudor Revival style and was designed by architect Henry Janeway Hardenbergh, who also lived here. Hardenbergh also designed the Bernardsville United Methodist Church and the parish house at St. Bernard's Church. The district includes several houses designed with Colonial Revival style.

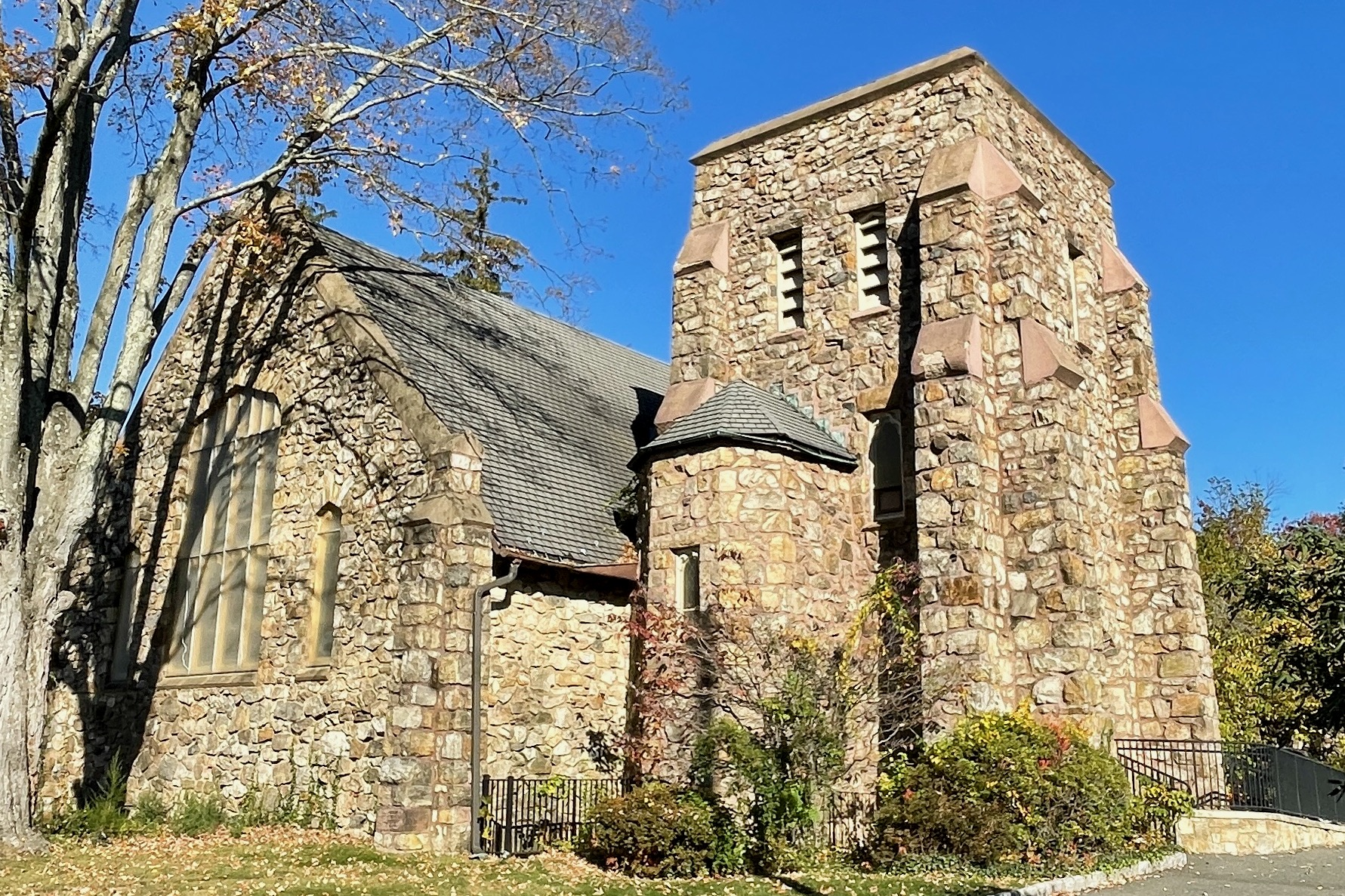
Bernardsville United Methodist Church

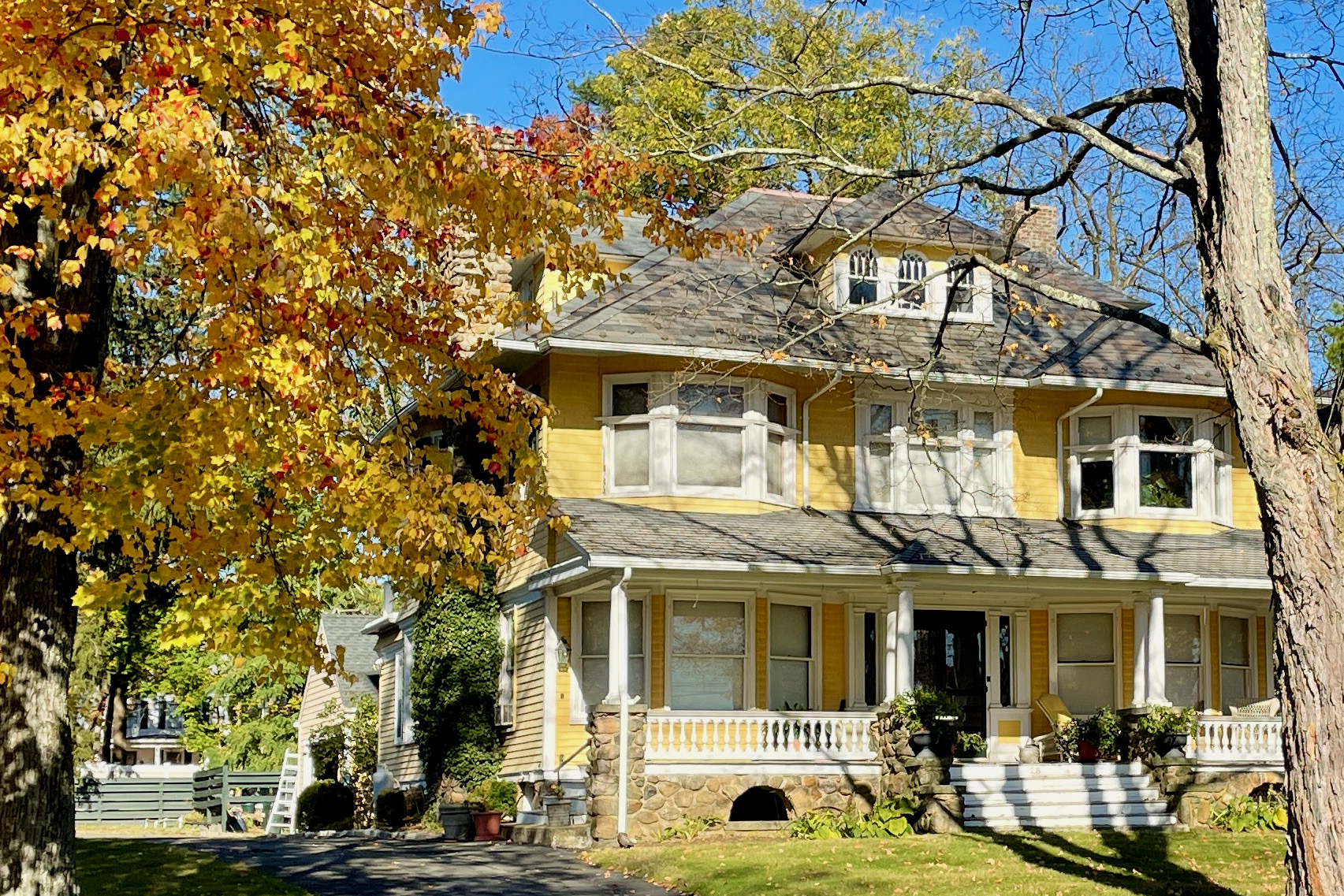
Colonial Revival style house

== Geography ==
According to the United States Census Bureau, the borough had a total area of 12.91 square miles (33.44 km^{2}), including 12.84 square miles (33.24 km^{2}) of land and 0.08 square miles (0.19 km^{2}) of water (0.58%).

Unincorporated communities, localities and place names located partially or completely within the borough include Blaziers Corner, Mine Brook and Somersetin.

The borough borders Bernards Township to the east, Far Hills to the southwest, and Peapack-Gladstone to the west in Somerset County, Harding Township to the northeast and both Mendham Borough and Mendham Township to the northwest in Morris County.

=== Climate ===
Bernardsville has a climate that borders between humid continental and humid subtropical with cool sometimes cold winters and warm to hot, humid summers on average. High elevations of the town have a warm summer humid continental climate with more snow during the winter and more orographic precipitation. Summer is the wettest season with frequent afternoon thunderstorms while Winter is the driest season.

Climate data for Bernardsville, New Jersey
Month	Jan	Feb	Mar	Apr	May	Jun	Jul	Aug	Sep	Oct	Nov	Dec	Year
Record high °F (°C)	74 (23)	76 (24)	86 (30)	94 (34)	99 (37)	101 (38)	104 (40)	105 (41)	105 (41)	92 (33)	84 (29)	73 (23)	105 (41)
Mean daily maximum °F (°C)	38 (3)	41 (5)	50 (10)	61 (16)	72 (22)	80 (27)	85 (29)	83 (28)	76 (24)	64 (18)	54 (12)	42 (6)	62 (17)
Mean daily minimum °F (°C)	18 (−8)	20 (−7)	27 (−3)	36 (2)	46 (8)	56 (13)	61 (16)	60 (16)	52 (11)	40 (4)	31 (−1)	23 (−5)	39.2 (4.0)
Record low °F (°C)	−16 (−27)	−12 (−24)	−1 (−18)	16 (−9)	26 (−3)	34 (1)	44 (7)	38 (3)	29 (−2)	12 (−11)	5 (−15)	−10 (−23)	−16 (−27)
Average precipitation inches (mm)	3.59 (91)	2.84 (72)	3.94 (100)	4.09 (104)	4.33 (110)	4.35 (110)	4.83 (123)	3.98 (101)	4.26 (108)	4.21 (107)	3.59 (91)	3.84 (98)	47.85 (1,215)
Source: Weather.com (Monthly Averages for Bernardsville, NJ)

== Demographics ==
Historical population
Census	Pop.	Note	%±
1930	3,336		—
1940	3,405		2.1%
1950	3,956		16.2%
1960	5,515		39.4%
1970	6,652		20.6%
1980	6,715		0.9%
1990	6,597		−1.8%
2000	7,345		11.3%
2010	7,707		4.9%
2020	7,893		2.4%
2023 (est.)	7,837	▼	−0.7%
Population sources:1930 1940–2000; 2010 2020

Some of Bernardsville's Latino population are made up of residents of "Little Paraguay" located on the Basking Ridge side of the train tracks.

=== 2020 census ===
As of the 2020 census, Bernardsville had a population of 7,893. The median age was 41.5 years. 25.4% of residents were under the age of 18 and 14.5% of residents were 65 years of age or older. For every 100 females there were 99.9 males, and for every 100 females age 18 and over there were 96.3 males age 18 and over.

69.8% of residents lived in urban areas, while 30.2% lived in rural areas.

There were 2,756 households in Bernardsville, of which 39.4% had children under the age of 18 living in them. Of all households, 64.8% were married-couple households, 11.5% were households with a male householder and no spouse or partner present, and 19.4% were households with a female householder and no spouse or partner present. About 18.2% of all households were made up of individuals and 8.9% had someone living alone who was 65 years of age or older.

There were 2,953 housing units, of which 6.7% were vacant. The homeowner vacancy rate was 2.4% and the rental vacancy rate was 6.4%.

Racial composition as of the 2020 census
Race	Number	Percent
White	6,104	77.3%
Black or African American	54	0.7%
American Indian and Alaska Native	118	1.5%
Asian	346	4.4%
Native Hawaiian and Other Pacific Islander	1	0.0%
Some other race	495	6.3%
Two or more races	775	9.8%
Hispanic or Latino (of any race)	1,272	16.1%

=== 2010 census ===
The 2010 United States census counted 7,707 people, 2,685 households, and 2,086 families in the borough. The population density was 597.2 per square mile (230.6/km^{2}). There were 2,871 housing units at an average density of 222.5 per square mile (85.9/km^{2}). The racial makeup was 91.38% (7,043) White, 0.88% (68) Black or African American, 0.14% (11) Native American, 3.27% (252) Asian, 0.06% (5) Pacific Islander, 2.18% (168) from other races, and 2.08% (160) from two or more races. Hispanic or Latino of any race were 11.72% (903) of the population.

Of the 2,685 households, 40.6% had children under the age of 18; 67.2% were married couples living together; 7.5% had a female householder with no husband present and 22.3% were non-families. Of all households, 19.1% were made up of individuals and 7.8% had someone living alone who was 65 years of age or older. The average household size was 2.87 and the average family size was 3.27.

28.6% of the population were under the age of 18, 5.5% from 18 to 24, 22.7% from 25 to 44, 31.0% from 45 to 64, and 12.2% who were 65 years of age or older. The median age was 41.1 years. For every 100 females, the population had 98.3 males. For every 100 females ages 18 and older there were 95.3 males.

The Census Bureau's 2006–2010 American Community Survey showed that (in 2010 inflation-adjusted dollars) median household income was $128,333 (with a margin of error of +/− $12,233) and the median family income was $141,510 (+/− $17,179). Males had a median income of $87,500 (+/− $36,816) versus $73,250 (+/− $10,725) for females. The per capita income for the borough was $70,141 (+/− $9,890). About 1.9% of families and 2.3% of the population were below the poverty line, including 1.2% of those under age 18 and 5.2% of those age 65 or over.

=== 2000 census ===
As of the 2000 United States census there were 7,345 people, 2,723 households, and 2,050 families residing in the borough. The population density was 568.1 inhabitants per square mile (219.3/km^{2}). There were 2,807 housing units at an average density of 217.1 per square mile (83.8/km^{2}). The racial makeup of the borough was 93.94% White, 0.25% African American, 0.15% Native American, 2.64% Asian, 1.55% from other races, and 1.47% from two or more races. Hispanic or Latino of any race were 5.98% of the population.

There were 2,723 households, out of which 35.9% had children under the age of 18 living with them, 67.2% were married couples living together, 6.0% had a female householder with no husband present, and 24.7% were non-families. 21.0% of all households were made up of individuals, and 8.4% had someone living alone who was 65 years of age or older. The average household size was 2.69 and the average family size was 3.12.

In the borough the population was spread out, with 26.1% under the age of 18, 4.5% from 18 to 24, 28.7% from 25 to 44, 28.0% from 45 to 64, and 12.7% who were 65 years of age or older. The median age was 40 years. For every 100 females, there were 96.1 males. For every 100 females age 18 and over, there were 92.3 males.

The median income for a household in the borough was $104,162, and the median income for a family was $126,601. Males had a median income of $91,842 versus $50,732 for females. The per capita income for the borough was $69,854. About 1.6% of families and 2.8% of the population were below the poverty line, including 2.3% of those under age 18 and 2.5% of those age 65 or over.

== Government ==
=== Local government ===
Bernardsville is governed under the borough form of New Jersey municipal government, which is used in 218 municipalities (of the 564) statewide, making it the most common form of government in New Jersey. The governing body is comprised of the mayor and the borough council, with all positions elected at-large on a partisan basis as part of the November general election. A mayor is elected directly by the voters to a four-year term of office. The borough council includes of six members elected to serve three-year terms on a staggered basis, with two seats coming up for election each year in a three-year cycle. The borough form of government used by Bernardsville is a "weak mayor / strong council" government in which council members act as the legislative body with the mayor presiding at meetings and voting only in the event of a tie. The mayor can veto ordinances subject to an override by a two-thirds majority vote of the council. The mayor makes committee and liaison assignments for council members, and most appointments are made by the mayor with the advice and consent of the council.

As of 2026, the Mayor of Bernardsville is Republican Mary Jane Canose, whose term of office ends December 31, 2026. Members of the Borough Council are Council President Christine Zamarra (D, 2026), Ross Zazzarino (R, 2027), Charlie Szrom (R, 2028), Albert Ribeiro (R, 2027), Jeffrey Roos (D, 2026) and Rich Traynor (D, 2028).

In June 2021, Democrat Thomas O'Dea Jr. resigned from office from a seat expiring in December 2023. In July 2021, the borough council selected Matthew Marino from a list of three candidates nominated by the Democratic municipal committee to fill the vacant seat on an interim basis. In November 2021, Republican Diane Greenfield was elected to serve the balance of the term of office.

In December 2018, the borough council selected Diane Greenfield from a list of three candidates nominated by the Republican municipal committee to fill the balance of the unexpired term of office ending in December 2019 that had been held by Michael C. Sullivan until he resigned from office earlier that month.

In February 2018, Republican John Donahue was selected by the borough council from three candidates nominated by the local party committee and appointed to fill the seat expiring in December 2018 that had been held by Michael dePoortere until he resigned from office earlier that month; Donohue will serve on an interim basis until the November 2018 general election.

In March 2018, Mayor Kevin Sooy, elected as a Republican, announced that he was switching parties and would run for re-election as a Democrat, saying that he was in sync with the platform of the local Democratic Party on issues facing the town. He would be defeated in the primary by Thomas O'Dea Jr. who was defeated in the general election by Republican Mary Jane Canose.

In 2018, the borough had an average property tax bill of $15,362, the highest in the county, compared to an average bill of $8,767 statewide.

=== Federal, state and county representation ===
Bernardsville is located in the 7th Congressional District and is part of New Jersey's 21st state legislative district.

For the 119th United States Congress, New Jersey's 7th congressional district is represented by Thomas Kean Jr. (R, Westfield). New Jersey is represented in the United States Senate by Democrats Cory Booker (Newark, term ends 2027) and Andy Kim (Moorestown, term ends 2031).

For the 2026–2027 session, the 21st legislative district of the New Jersey Legislature is represented in the State Senate by Jon Bramnick (R, Westfield) and in the General Assembly by Vincent Kearney (D, Garwood) and Andrew Macurdy (D, Summit).

Somerset County is governed by a five-member Board of County Commissioners, whose members are elected at-large to three-year terms of office on a staggered basis, with one or two seats coming up for election each year. At an annual reorganization meeting held in the first week of January, the board selects a Director and deputy director from among its members. As of 2025, Somerset County's County Commissioners are Director Shanel Robinson (D, Franklin Township, term as commissioner ends 2027; term as director ends 2026), Deputy Director Paul Drake (D, Hillsborough Township, term as commissioner and as deputy director ends 2026), Melonie Marano (D, Green Brook Township, 2028), Elizabeth Graner (D, Bernards Township, 2026; elected to serve an unexpired term) and Sara Sooy (D, Bedminster Township, 2027).

Constitutional officers, elected on a countywide basis are Clerk Steve Peter (D, Somerville, 2027), Sheriff Darrin Russo (D, Franklin Township, 2028) and Surrogate Bernice "Tina" Jalloh (D, Franklin Township, 2030).

=== Politics ===
As of March 2011, there were a total of 5,341 registered voters in Bernardsville, of which 955 (17.9% vs. 26.0% countywide) were registered as Democrats, 2,472 (46.3% vs. 25.7%) were registered as Republicans and 1,913 (35.8% vs. 48.2%) were registered as unaffiliated. There was one voter registered to another party. Among the borough's 2010 Census population, 69.3% (vs. 60.4% in Somerset County) were registered to vote, including 97.1% of those ages 18 and over (vs. 80.4% countywide).

United States presidential election results for Bernardsville
Year	Republican		Democratic		Third party(ies)	
Year	No.	%	No.	%	No.	%
2024	2,231	47.52%	2,371	50.50%	93	1.98%
2020	2,116	44.01%	2,608	54.24%	84	1.75%
2016	2,071	50.38%	1,860	45.24%	180	4.38%
2012	2,318	61.32%	1,408	37.25%	54	1.43%
2008	2,295	56.13%	1,753	42.87%	41	1.00%
2004	2,495	61.23%	1,543	37.87%	37	0.91%
2000	2,065	63.68%	1,087	33.52%	91	2.81%

In the 2012 presidential election, Republican Mitt Romney received 61.5% of the vote (2,318 cast), ahead of incumbent President Barack Obama, a Democrat, with 37.3% (1,408 votes), and other candidates with 1.2% (44 votes), among the 3,788 ballots cast by the borough's 5,673 registered voters (18 ballots were spoiled), for a turnout of 66.8%. In the 2008 presidential election, Republican John McCain received 2,295 votes (55.8% vs. 46.1% countywide), ahead of Democrat Obama with 1,753 votes (42.6% vs. 52.1%) and other candidates with 41 votes (1.0% vs. 1.1%), among the 4,113 ballots cast by the borough's 5,208 registered voters, for a turnout of 79.0% (vs. 78.7% in Somerset County). In the 2004 presidential election, Republican George W. Bush received 2,495 votes (61.0% vs. 51.5% countywide), ahead of Democrat John Kerry with 1,543 votes (37.7% vs. 47.2%) and other candidates with 37 votes (0.9% vs. 0.9%), among the 4,093 ballots cast by the borough's 4,909 registered voters, for a turnout of 83.4% (vs. 81.7% in the whole county).

Gubernatorial election results for Bernardsville
Year	Republican		Democratic		Third party(ies)	
Year	No.	%	No.	%	No.	%
2025	1,837	49.32%	1,867	50.12%	21	0.56%
2021	1,807	56.22%	1,391	43.28%	16	0.50%
2017	1,520	56.36%	1,134	42.05%	43	1.59%
2013	2,118	77.90%	564	20.74%	37	1.36%
2009	1,867	60.42%	747	24.17%	476	15.40%
2005	1,773	62.87%	969	34.36%	78	2.77%

In the 2013 gubernatorial election, Republican Chris Christie received 77.9% of the vote (2,118 cast), ahead of Democrat Barbara Buono with 20.7% (564 votes), and other candidates with 1.4% (37 votes), among the 2,762 ballots cast by the borough's 5,728 registered voters (43 ballots were spoiled), for a turnout of 48.2%. In the 2009 gubernatorial election, Republican Christie received 1,867 votes (60.2% vs. 55.8% countywide), ahead of Democrat Jon Corzine with 747 votes (24.1% vs. 34.1%), Independent Chris Daggett with 463 votes (14.9% vs. 8.7%) and other candidates with 13 votes (0.4% vs. 0.7%), among the 3,099 ballots cast by the borough's 5,304 registered voters, yielding a 58.4% turnout (vs. 52.5% in the county).

United States Senate election results for Bernardsville1
Year	Republican		Democratic		Third party(ies)	
Year	No.	%	No.	%	No.	%
2024	2,304	50.08%	2,222	48.29%	75	1.63%
2018	2,032	55.76%	1,522	41.77%	90	2.47%
2012	2,251	62.37%	1,301	36.05%	57	1.58%
2006	1,841	62.41%	1,038	35.19%	71	2.41%

United States Senate election results for Bernardsville2
Year	Republican		Democratic		Third party(ies)	
Year	No.	%	No.	%	No.	%
2020	2,348	49.19%	2,398	50.24%	27	0.57%
2014	1,530	59.44%	1,007	39.12%	37	1.44%
2013	1,076	59.61%	718	39.78%	11	0.61%
2008	2,437	63.18%	1,348	34.95%	72	1.87%

== Education ==
Public school students in pre-kindergarten through twelfth grade attend the schools of the Somerset Hills School District, a regional school district serving students from Bernardsville, Far Hills and Peapack-Gladstone, along with students from Bedminster who are sent to the district's high school as part of a sending/receiving relationship. As of the 2022–23 school year, the district, comprised of three schools, had an enrollment of 1,761 students and 151.3 classroom teachers (on an FTE basis), for a student–teacher ratio of 11.6:1. Schools in the district (with 2022–23 enrollment data from the National Center for Education Statistics) are Marion T. Bedwell Elementary School with 453 students in grades PreK–4, Bernardsville Middle School with 458 students in grades 5–8 and Bernards High School with 812 students in grades 9–12. The district's board of education is comprised of nine elected members (plus one appointed member representing Bedminster) who set policy and oversee the fiscal and educational operation of the district through its administration. The nine elected seats on the board are allocated to the constituent municipalities based on population, with six seats allocated to Bernardsville.

The School of Saint Elizabeth, established in 1916, is a parochial school serving students in pre-kindergarten through eighth grade that operates under the auspices of the Roman Catholic Diocese of Metuchen.

== Transportation ==
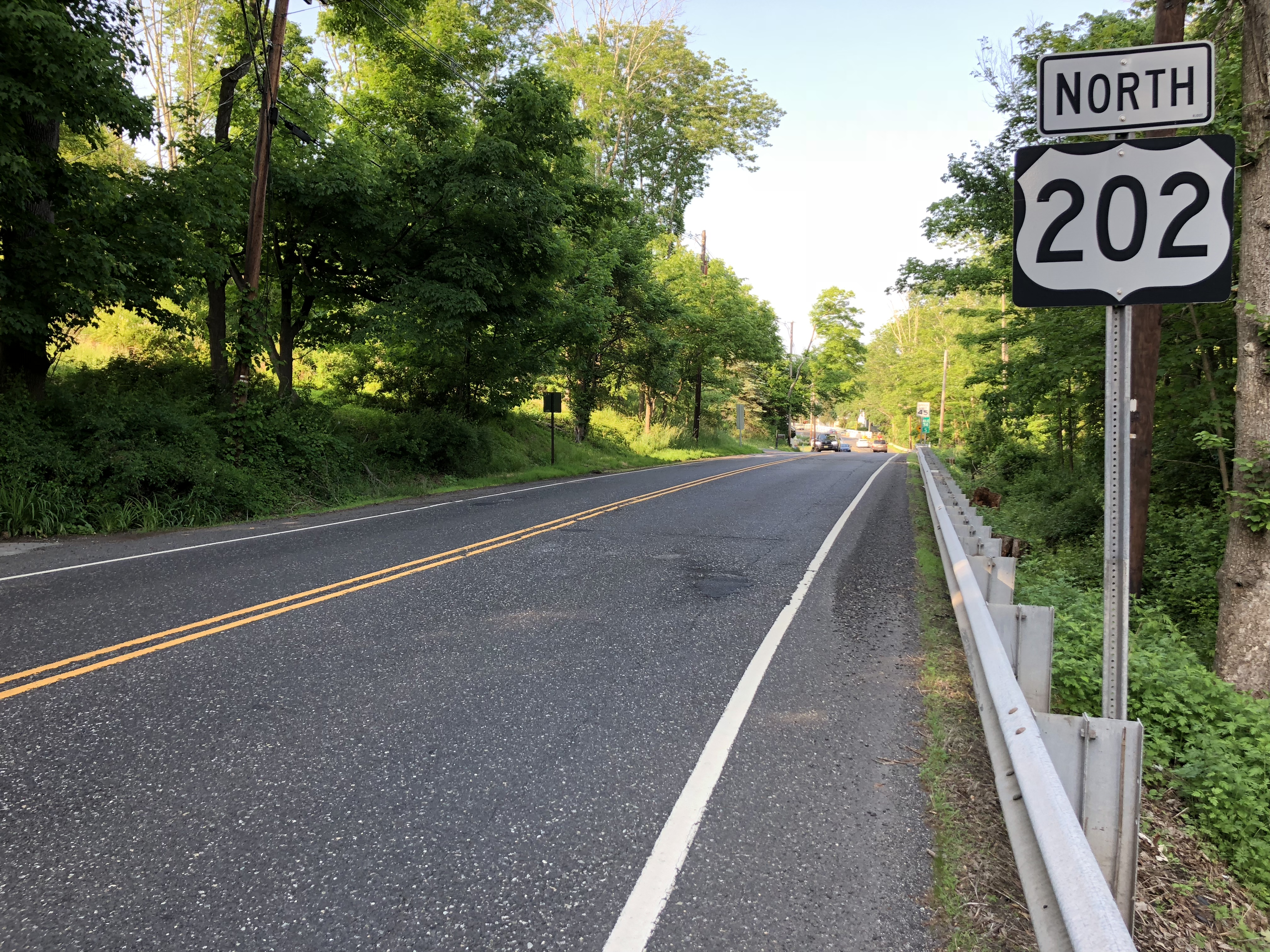
U.S. Route 202 in Bernardsville

=== Roads and highways ===
As of May 2010, the borough had a total of 67.80 miles (109.11 km) of roadways, of which 53.28 miles (85.75 km) were maintained by the municipality, 10.50 miles (16.90 km) by Somerset County and 4.02 miles (6.47 km) by the New Jersey Department of Transportation.

The most prominent roads directly serving Bernardsville are U.S. Route 202 and County Route 525. Interstate 287 passes by just outside the borough.

=== Public transportation ===
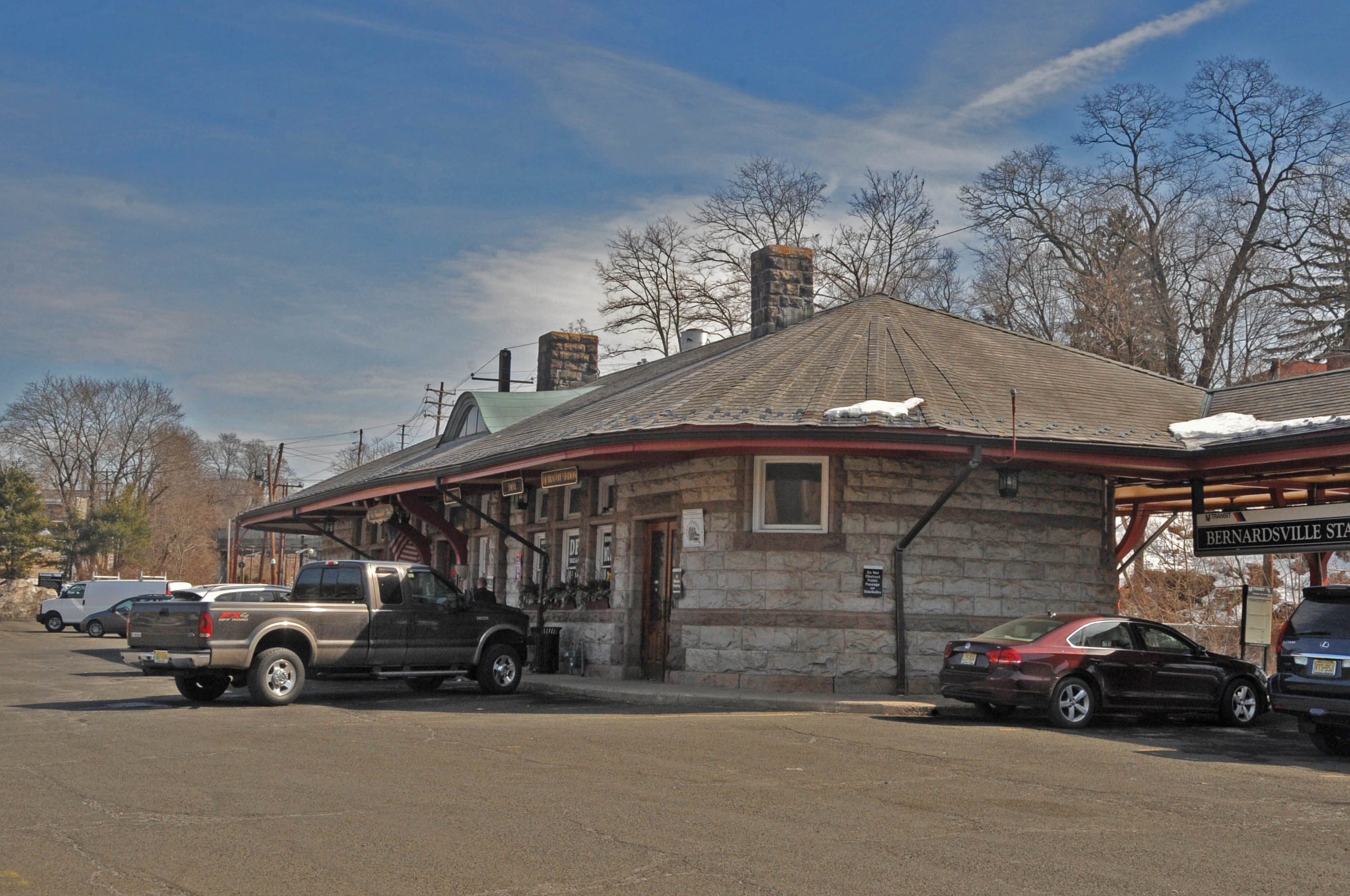
Bernardsville train station is listed on the National Register of Historic Places.

NJ Transit commuter rail service is offered at the Bernardsville station, Trains are available on the Gladstone Branch and Morristown Line of the Morris & Essex Lines, with service to Hoboken Terminal, Newark Broad Street station Secaucus Junction and to New York Penn Station in Midtown Manhattan.

Lakeland Bus Lines provides Route 78 rush-hour service from Bedminster to the Port Authority Bus Terminal in Midtown Manhattan.

== Notable people ==
People who were born in, residents of, or otherwise closely associated with Bernardsville include:

- Walt Ader (1913–1982), race car driver who placed 22nd at the 1950 Indianapolis 500
- Archibald S. Alexander (1906–1979), lawyer, civil servant and politician who served as Under Secretary of the United States Army and as New Jersey State Treasurer
- Brooke Astor (1902–2007), lived here during her marriage to John Dryden Kuser (1897–1964)
- Roger Bart (born 1962), actor
- John A. Bensel (1863–1922), civil engineer and politician who served as president of the American Society of Civil Engineers
- Sir Francis Bernard (1712–1779), British colonial administrator who served as governor of the provinces of New Jersey and Massachusetts Bay
- C. Ledyard Blair (1867–1949), prominent resident and investment banker
- Martin Blumenson (1918–2005), military historian and author
- Roger Bodman (born 1952), politician and political strategist who served in the cabinet of New Jersey Governor Thomas Kean
- Philip Capice (1931–2009), Emmy Award-winning television producer
- Jimmy Davies (1913–1940), Royal Air Force combat fighter pilot who was the first American-born airman to die in combat in World War II
- Tommy Dorsey (1905–1956), jazz musician who lived at "Tall Oaks" in Bernardsville from 1935 to 1941
- Forrest F. Dryden (1864–1932), President of Prudential Insurance Company
- John Fairfield Dryden (1839–1911), founder of Prudential Insurance Company and U.S. Senator
- Ernest Duncan (1916–1990), mathematician
- Marc Ecko (born 1972), fashion designer and entrepreneur
- Millicent Fenwick (1910–1992), U.S. Congresswoman, United States representative to the United Nations Food and Agriculture Organization
- Zach Feuer (born 1978), art dealer, founder of New Art Dealers Alliance and owner of Zach Feuer Gallery
- Guy Gabrielson (1891–1976), chairman of the Republican National Committee and member of the New Jersey General Assembly from 1925 to 1929
- Alina Habba (born 1984), lawyer best known for representing former president of the United States, Donald Trump.
- Ogden H. Hammond (1869–1956), businessman, politician and diplomat who served as United States Ambassador to Spain
- Henry Janeway Hardenbergh (1847–1918), architect
- Jacqueline Kennedy Onassis (1929–1994), former first lady, who lived in Bernardsville with her husband Aristotle Onassis
- Randy Mastro (born 1956), attorney and government official, who served as deputy mayor of New York City
- Elmer Matthews (1927–2015), lawyer and politician who served three terms in the New Jersey General Assembly
- Andrew McCarthy (born 1962), actor
- Katie Meyler (born 1982), 2014's Time Person of the Year for Ebola Fighters
- Bill Moyers (1934–2025), journalist and commentator
- Bob Nash (1892–1977), pioneering football player in the earliest days of the National Football League
- Frederic P. Olcott (1841–1909), financier, politician and philanthropist
- George B. Post (1837–1913), Beaux-Arts style architect and early developer of Bernardsville
- James Otis Post (1873–1951), architect
- William Stone Post (1866–1940), architect known for his work on the for his work at City College of New York and the New York Stock Exchange Building
- Rachel Rochat (born 1972), ice hockey player who competed for the Swiss national team in the women's tournament at the 2006 Winter Olympics
- Donald Roebling (1908–1959), inventor of the amphtrack
- John A. Roebling II (1867–1952), engineer and philanthropist
- Carol Stiff, vice president of programming and acquisitions at ESPN and president of the Women's Basketball Hall of Fame's board of directors
- Suzanne Scott (born 1965/66), CEO of Fox News
- Meryl Streep (born 1949), actress
- Mike Tyson (born 1966) and Robin Givens (born 1964)
- Jean Villepique, actress known for her roles in BoJack Horseman, A.P. Bio and Up All Night
- Rodney Young (archaeologist), a distinguished classical archaeologist appointed to chief of the OSS' "Greek Desk" by Gen. "Wild Bill Donovan" during World War II.
