= St. Bernard's Church and Parish House =

Historic church in New Jersey, United States

- U.S. National Register of Historic Places
- New Jersey Register of Historic Places
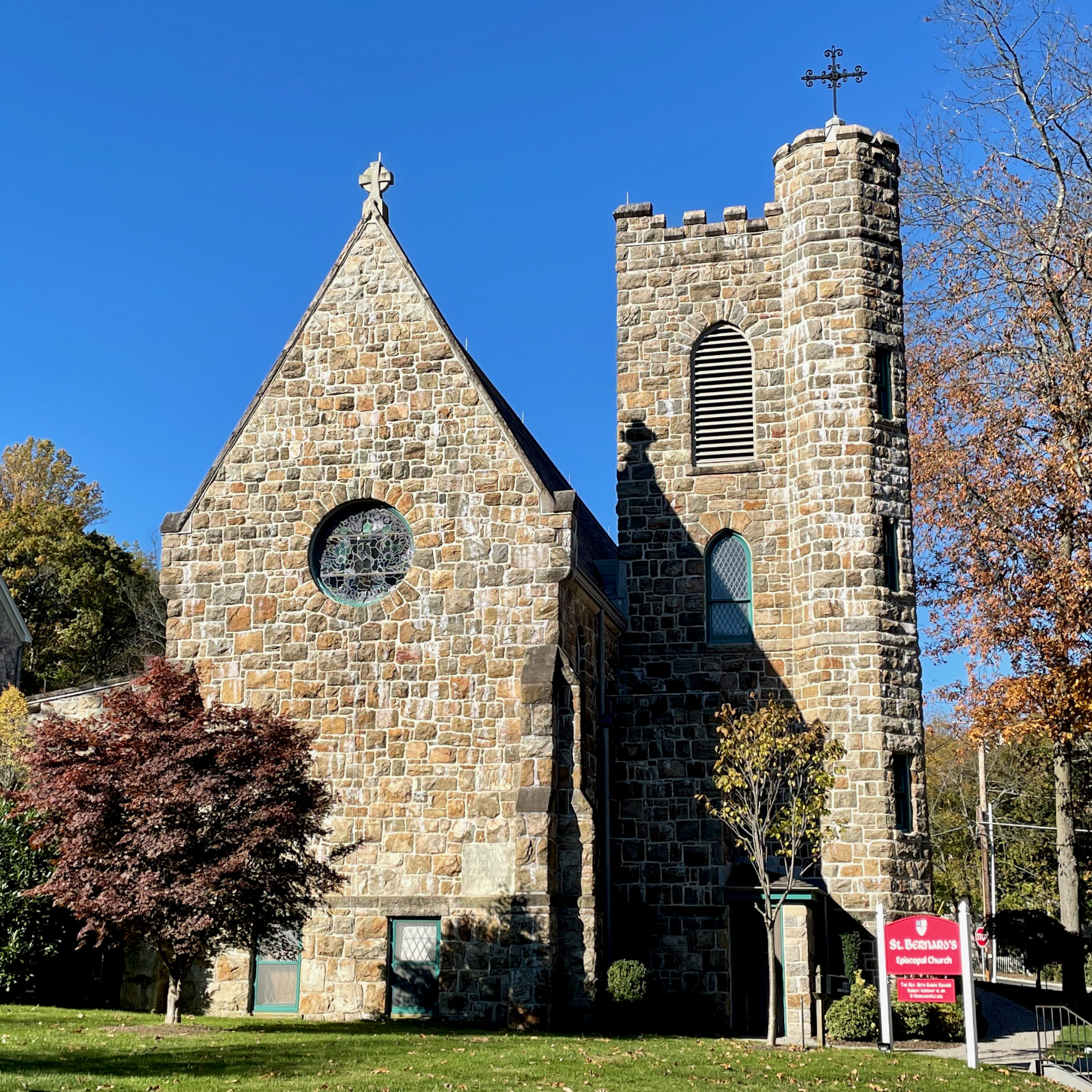
- St. Bernard's Episcopal Church

- Location within Somerset County, New Jersey Location within New Jersey Location within the United States
- Location: 88 Claremont Road; Bernardsville, New Jersey
- Coordinates: 40°43′20″N 74°34′21″W
- Area: 1.4 acres (0.57 ha)
- Built: 1897
- Architect: Church: Napoleon LeBrun & Sons; Reconstruction: William G. Halsey; Parish House: Henry Janeway Hardenbergh; Stained Glass: Charles Eamer Kempe
- Architectural style: Gothic Revival
- NRHP reference No.: 06000761
- NJRHP No.: 4269

Significant dates
- Added to NRHP: September 6, 2006
- Designated NJRHP: June 28, 2006

St. Bernard's Church and Parish House is a historic church complex located at 88 Claremont Road in the borough of Bernardsville in Somerset County, New Jersey. This Episcopal Church in the Episcopal Diocese of New Jersey is named after St. Bernard of Clairvaux. It was added to the National Register of Historic Places on September 6, 2006, for its significance in architecture.

== History and description ==
The congregation was organized on October 22, 1896 and the building committee selected the architectural firm Napoleon LeBrun & Sons to design and build the church. Built with schist laid as random ashlar, it was designed to be a "purely English Gothic" church. It features a four-stage square tower with an attached hexagonal stair turret and topped with a metal cross. The cornerstone is dated 1897 and the church opened on June 29, 1898. The parish house was designed by architect Henry Janeway Hardenbergh, also a member of the congregation, and built in 1912. The stained-glass windows were made by the studios of Victorian designer Charles Eamer Kempe.

== See also ==
- National Register of Historic Places listings in Somerset County, New Jersey
- List of Episcopal churches in the United States
