= John Parker (abolitionist) =

American abolitionist & industrialist (c. 1827–1900)

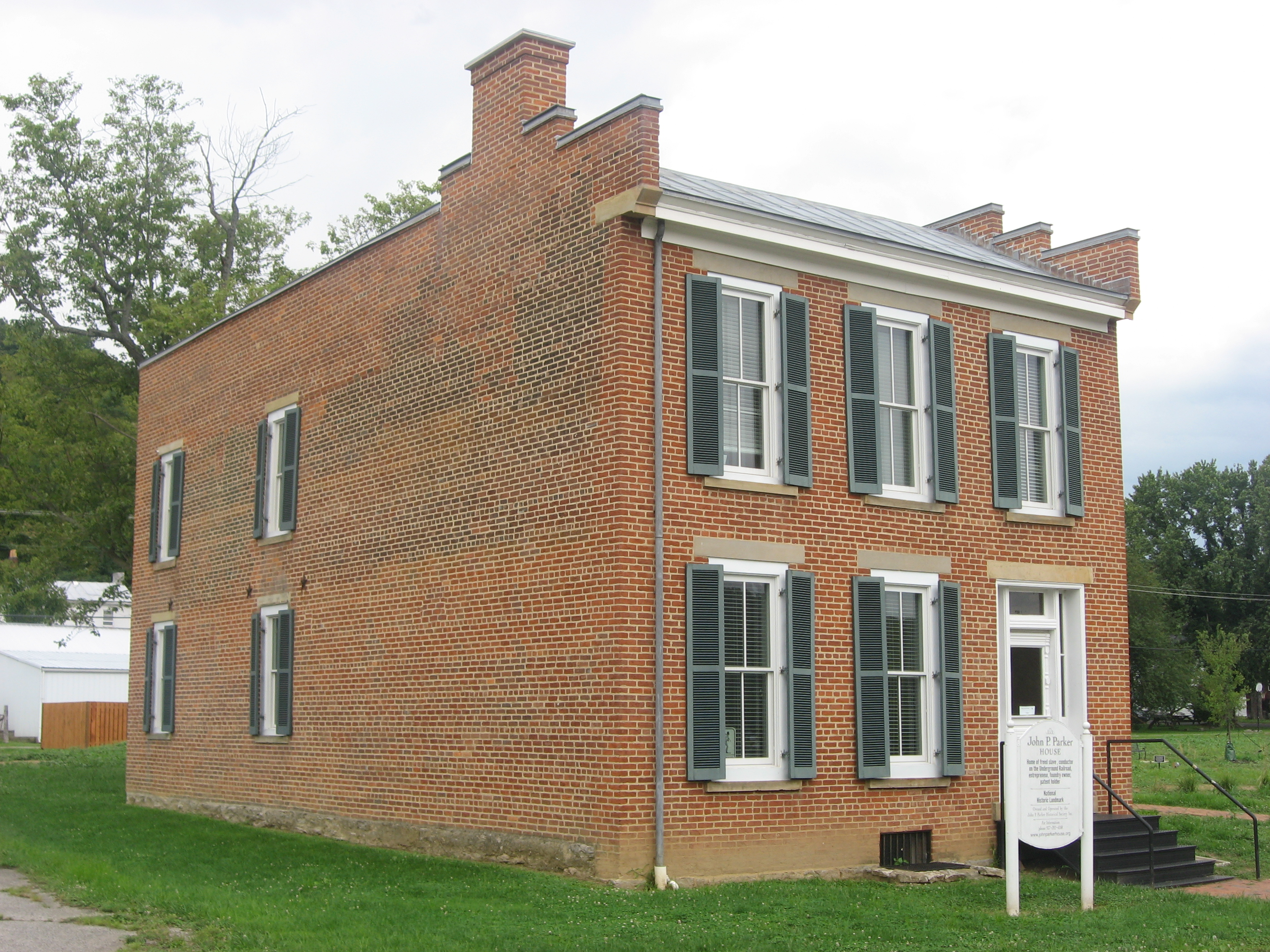
The restored John P. Parker house in Ripley, Ohio.

John P. Parker (c. 1827 – January 30, 1900) was an American abolitionist, inventor, iron moulder and industrialist. Parker, who was half African American, helped hundreds of slaves to freedom in the Underground Railroad resistance movement based in Ripley, Ohio. He saved and rescued fugitive slaves for nearly fifteen years. He was one of the few black people to patent an invention before 1900. His house in Ripley has been designated a National Historic Landmark and restored.

== Early life and education ==
Parker was born in Norfolk, Virginia in about 1827. He was the son of a slave mother and white father. Born into slavery under the principle of partus sequitur ventrem, at the age of eight John was forced to walk to Richmond, where he was sold at the slave market to a physician from Mobile, Alabama.

While working at the doctor's house as a domestic servant, John was taught to read and write by the doctor's family, although the law forbade slaves' being educated. During his apprenticeship in a foundry, John attempted escape to New Orleans by riverboat and had conflicts with officials. He asked one of the doctor's patients, a widow, to purchase him. After taking title to him, she allowed him to hire out to earn money, and he purchased his freedom from her for $1,800 (~$62,196 in 2025) in 1845. He earned the money through his work in two of Mobile's iron foundries and occasional odd jobs.

== Freedom in the North ==
=== Marriage and family ===
Parker left the South, first settling in Jeffersonville, Indiana, then Cincinnati, Ohio, where there were larger free black communities and jobs in the bustling port. There in 1848 he married Miranda Boulden, free born in the city. They moved to Ripley, a growing center of abolitionist activity, and had seven children together:

- John P. Parker Jr., b. 1849, attended Oberlin College, came home for Christmas break with pneumonia and died in his sophomore year. He is buried in Maplewood Cemetery in Ripley, Ohio.
- Hale Giddings Parker, b. 1851, graduated from Oberlin College's classical program and became the principal of a black school in St. Louis; later he studied law and in 1894 moved to Chicago to become an attorney
- Cassius Clay Parker, b. 1853 (the first two sons were named after prominent abolitionists); he studied at Oberlin College and became a teacher in Indiana.
- Horatio W. Parker, b. 1856, became a principal of a school in Illinois; he later taught in St. Louis.
- Hortense Parker, b. 1859; she and her two sisters all studied music; Hortense was among the first African-American graduates of Mount Holyoke College; after marriage in 1913, she moved to St. Louis and continued to teach music. Her husband was a college graduate who served as principal of a school.
- Portia, b. 1865, became a music teacher
- Bianca, b. 1871, became a music teacher

The parents ensured that all their children were educated. Two generations from slavery, all six went to college and entered the middle class.

=== Underground Railroad ===
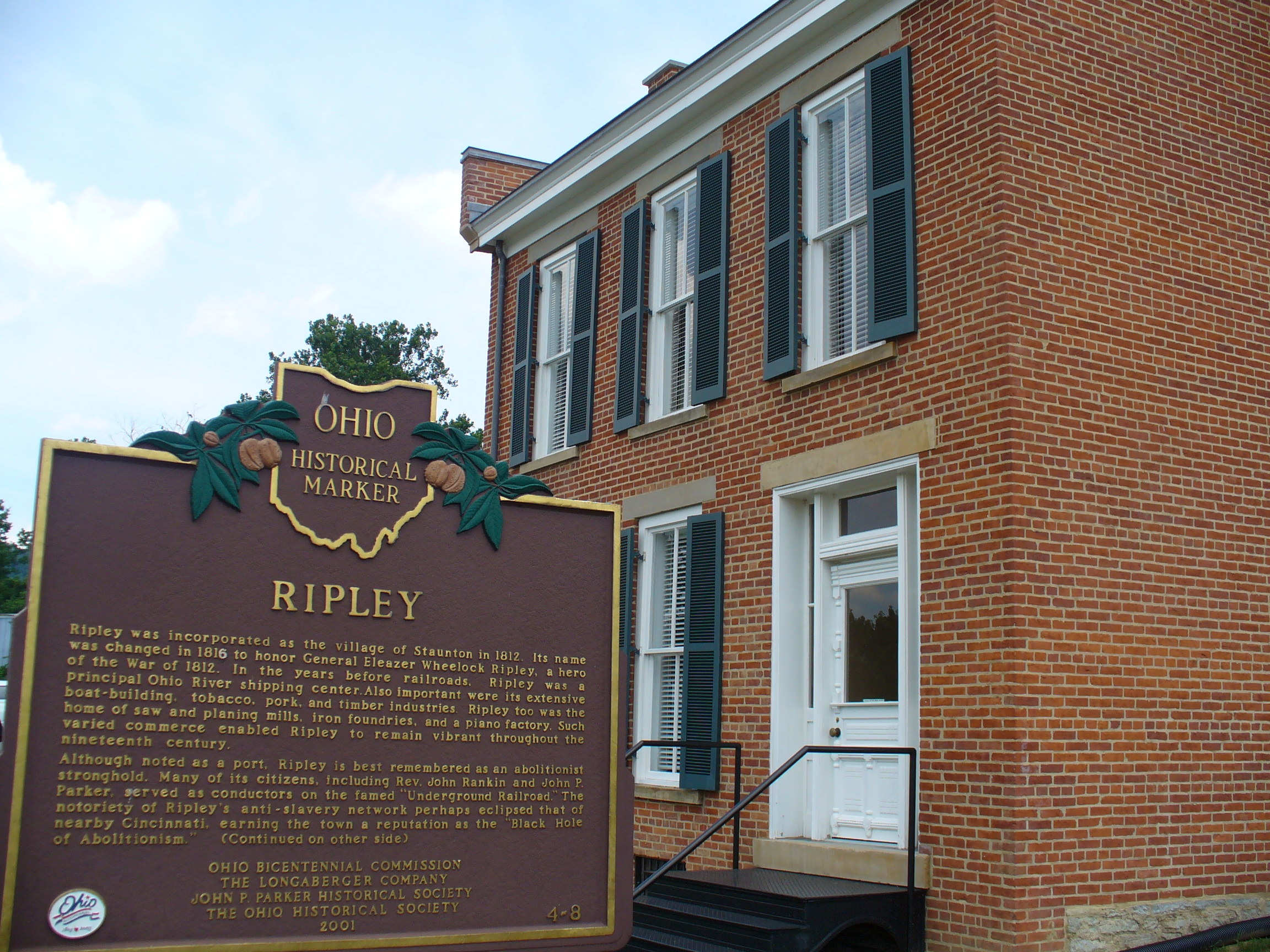
Parker House and historic marker

In Ripley, Parker joined the resistance movement, known as the Underground Railroad, whose members aided slaves escaping across the river from Kentucky to get further North to freedom; some chose to go to Canada. He guided hundreds of slaves along their way, continuing despite a $1,000 bounty placed on his head by slaveholders. The federal Fugitive Slave Act of 1850 increased the penalties for such activism. Parker risked his own freedom every time he went to Kentucky to help slaves to escape. During the Civil War, he recruited a few hundred slaves for the Union Army.

== Industrialist ==
The historian Stuart Seely Sprague has researched much information about Parker and his life. Beginning as an iron moulder, Parker developed and patented a number of mechanical and industrial inventions, including the John P. Parker tobacco press and harrow (or pulverizer), patented in 1884 and 1885. He had invented the pulverizer while still a young man in Mobile in the 1840s. Parker was one of the few Black Americans to patent an invention before 1900.

In 1865 with a partner, he bought a foundry company, which they called the Ripley Foundry and Machine Company. Parker managed the company, which manufactured engines, Dorsey's patent reaper and mower, and sugar mill. In 1876 he brought in a partner to manufacture threshers, and the company became Belchamber and Parker. Although they dissolved the partnership two years later, Parker continued to grow his business, adding a blacksmith shop and machine shop. In 1890, after a destructive fire at his first facility, Parker built the Phoenix Foundry. It was the largest between Cincinnati and Portsmouth, Ohio.

== Legacy and honors ==
- The John P. Parker Historical Society was formed in 1996 to preserve and interpret knowledge of John Parker and his family; it has worked to restore the house and operate it as a museum with exhibits and educational programs.
- His autobiography, a slave narrative, was published in 1996 as HIS PROMISED LAND: THE AUTOBIOGRAPHY OF JOHN P. PARKER, FORMER SLAVE AND CONDUCTOR ON THE UNDERGROUND RAILROAD. In the 1880s, Parker gave interviews to the journalist Frank Moody Gregg of the Chattanooga News, who had been researching the resistance movement. He never published his manuscript, and the historian Stuart Seely Sprague found Gregg's manuscript and notes in Duke University archives. He edited the memoir for publication, to keep Parker's language, and added a detailed biography in the preface.
- The John P. Parker House was designated a National Historic Landmark in 1997 by the U.S. Department of the Interior.
- John P. Parker School, in Cincinnati, Ohio, is a pre-kindergarten through 6th grade school named after him.
- Rise for Freedom: The John P. Parker Story, opera by Adolphus Hailstork.

== In popular culture ==
- In her children's book, Trouble Don't Last (2003), Shelly Pearsall based her character of "The River Man" on Parker, as a tribute to his success in helping escaped slaves cross the Ohio River and onwards towards freedom.
- In Sharon Dennis Wyeth's Freedom's Wings, a book in the My America series, John Parker helps the main character cross the Ohio River.
