= Stillman Parker House =

Historic house in Massachusetts, United States

- U.S. National Register of Historic Places
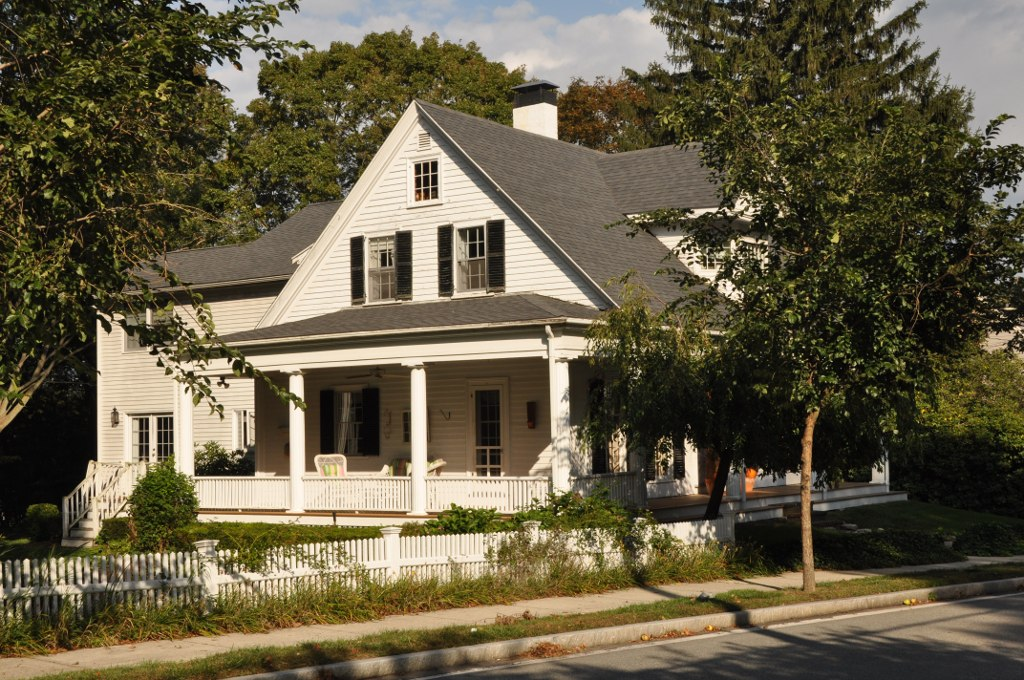

- Location within Massachusetts Location within the United States
- Location: Reading, Massachusetts
- Coordinates: 42°30′39″N 71°6′20″W
- Built: 1851
- Architectural style: Greek Revival
- MPS: Reading MRA
- NRHP reference No.: 84002785
- Added to NRHP: July 19, 1984

The Stillman Parker House is a historic house at 484 Summer Avenue in Reading, Massachusetts. Probably built in the 1850s, it is a rare local variant of transitional Federal/Greek Revival styling. The 1 1/2-story wood-frame house has a high-pitched roof which extends over the front porch, which is supported by fluted Doric columns. The doors and windows have Greek Revival architrave surrounds. The house belonged to Stillman Parker, a local shoe manufacturer who also served on the town's board of selectmen.

The house was listed on the National Register of Historic Places in 1984.

== See also ==
- National Register of Historic Places listings in Reading, Massachusetts
- National Register of Historic Places listings in Middlesex County, Massachusetts
