= James Parker House =

Historic house in Massachusetts, United States

- U.S. National Register of Historic Places
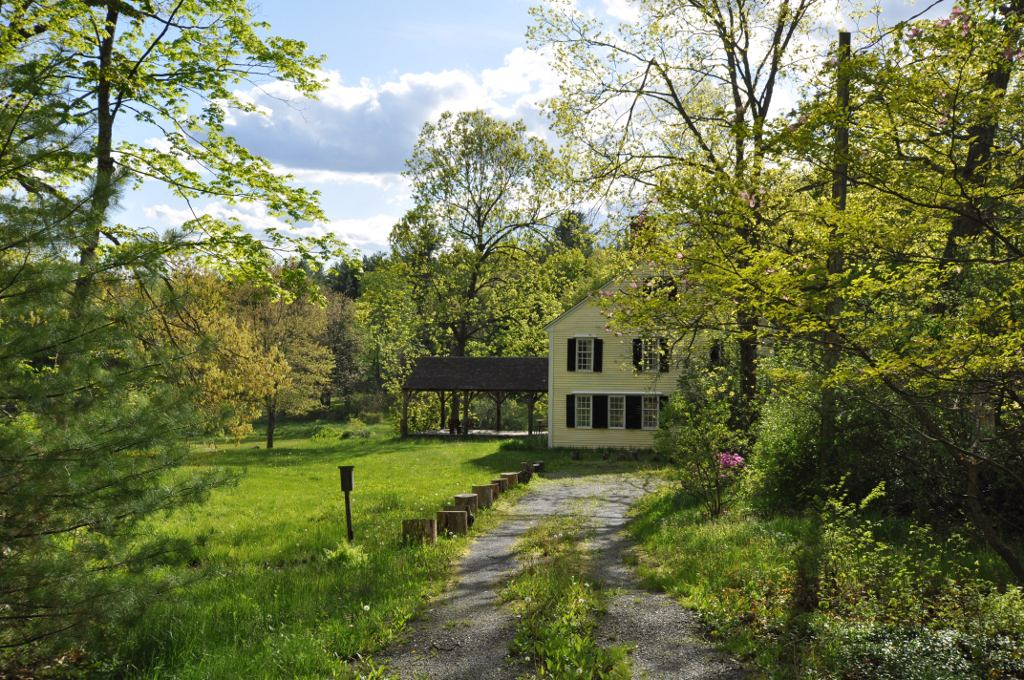

- Location within Massachusetts Location within the United States
- Location: Shirley, Massachusetts
- Coordinates: 42°33′36″N 71°39′32″W
- Architectural style: Colonial
- NRHP reference No.: 88000163
- Added to NRHP: February 25, 1988

The James Parker House is a historic house on Center Road in Shirley, Massachusetts, United States. The oldest portion of this 2 1/2-story wood-frame house was built c. 1720, and probably consisted of a typical First Period three-bay structure with a large chimney. The house was enlarged to its present five-bay width in 1797 by James Parker, a noted local resident. The house stands at the end of an 18th-century road, and is one of the few 18th-century buildings left in Shirley.

The house was added to the National Register of Historic Places in 1988.

== See also ==
- National Register of Historic Places listings in Middlesex County, Massachusetts
