= Joseph Parker House =

Historic house in Massachusetts, United States

- U.S. National Register of Historic Places
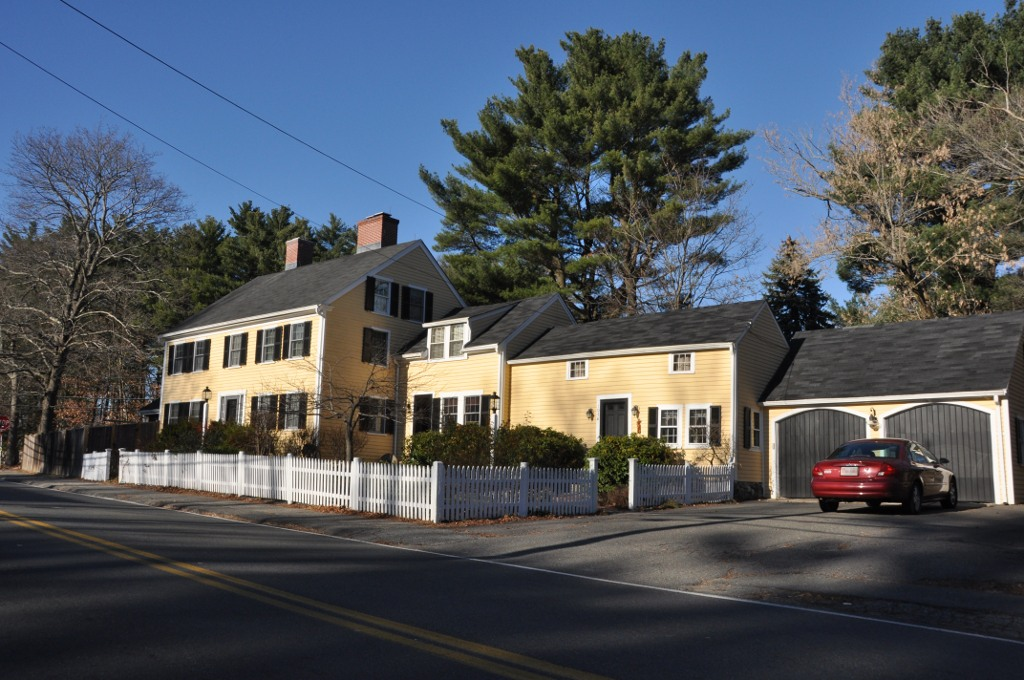

- Location within Massachusetts Location within the United States
- Location: Reading, Massachusetts
- Coordinates: 42°32′11.73″N 71°7′14.78″W
- Built: 1795
- MPS: Reading MRA
- NRHP reference No.: 84002781
- Added to NRHP: July 19, 1984

The Joseph Parker House is a historic house at 107 Grove Street in Reading, Massachusetts. The 2 1/2-story wood-frame house was probably built around 1795, when it first appeared on local maps. It is predominantly Federal in its styling, with smaller second-story windows and boxed cornices. Its center entry surround is a Greek Revival feature, with an architrave surround with corner blocks and half-length sidelight windows. The house's notable occupants include Loea Parker, who died in the War of 1812, and F. Howard Gilson, an early experimenter in photography. From 1910 to 1932 it was owned by the Fathers' and Mothers' Club, which used it as a country retreat for urban youth.

The house was added to the National Register of Historic Places in 1984.

== See also ==
- National Register of Historic Places listings in Reading, Massachusetts
- National Register of Historic Places listings in Middlesex County, Massachusetts
