= Parker House (Sea Girt, New Jersey) =

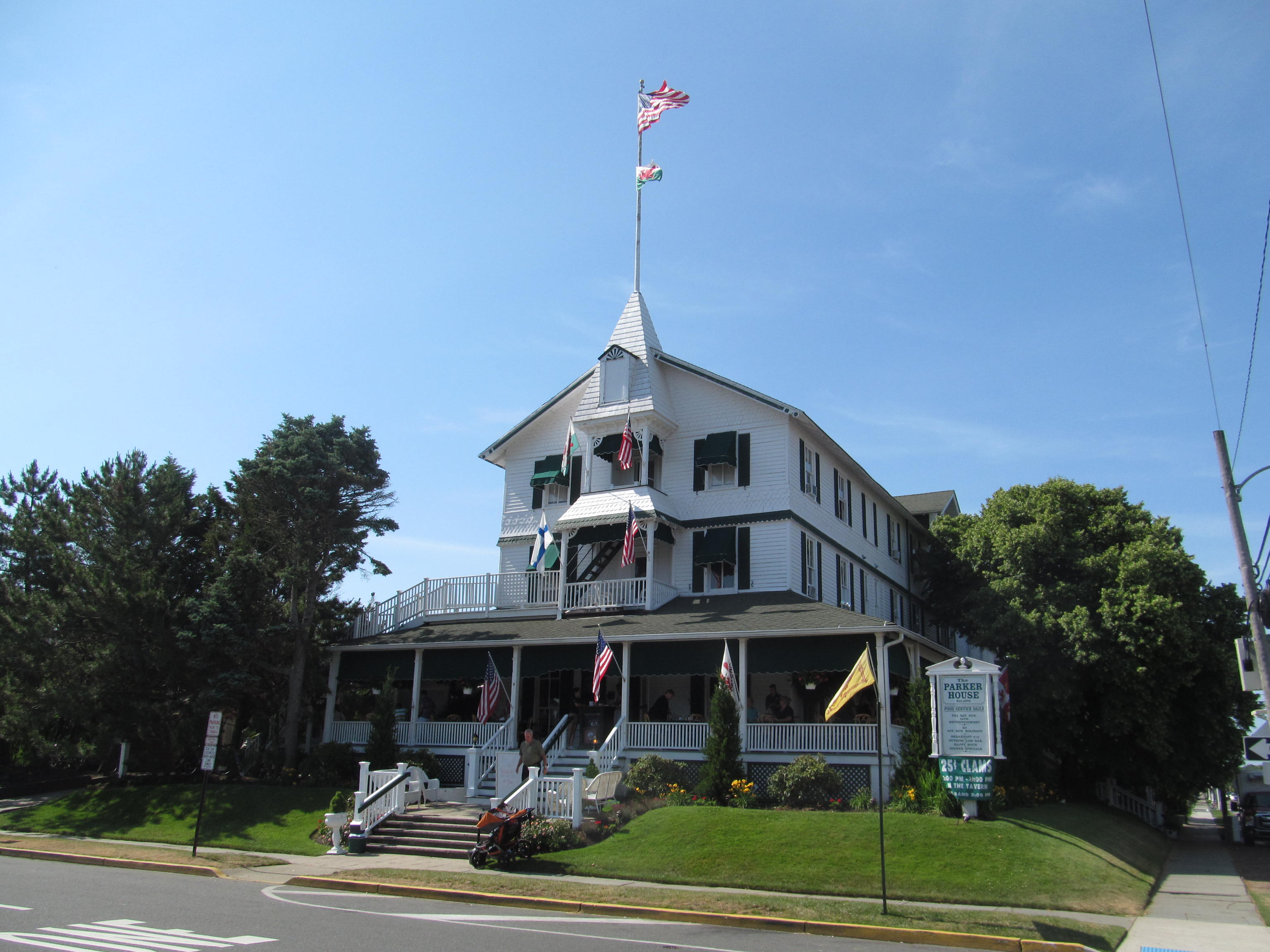
- The Parker House in 2014
- Interactive map of the Parker House area

General information
- Location: 290 1st Ave, Sea Girt, New Jersey, United States
- Coordinates: 40°08′11″N 74°01′44″W
- Elevation: Sea level
- Opened: May 22, 1880; 146 years ago

Other information
- Parking: Street parking

Website
- Official website

The Parker House was built c. 1878 in what is now Sea Girt, New Jersey. The 20,000 sq ft (1,900 m^{2}) business establishment has been in operation since May 22, 1880, (Note: Some press sources describe the Parker House as having opened for business in 1878, though contemporaneously published sources place the year of opening as 1880.) when it opened as a hotel with capacity for one hundred guests. The establishment gained a summer-season liquor license in 1935 and it remains in operation as a summer-season bar, restaurant, and nightclub.

== History ==
The Parker House began operation in 1880 under the proprietorship of Thomas Devlin, a Manasquan resident who had established a reputation as a quality chef. On May 7, 1880, unable to choose a name on his own, Devlin chose to name his new hotel by drawing names from a hat. His wife had placed the name "Parker" into the hat in a nod to Joel Parker, a governor of New Jersey who served during the American Civil War; Devlin drew the name by chance. The Parker House opened for business on May 22, 1880, having a capacity to hold about one hundred guests. Early on, it served a variety of roles in addition to being a hotel, such as briefly hosting Catholic Mass in its parlor during the early 1880s.

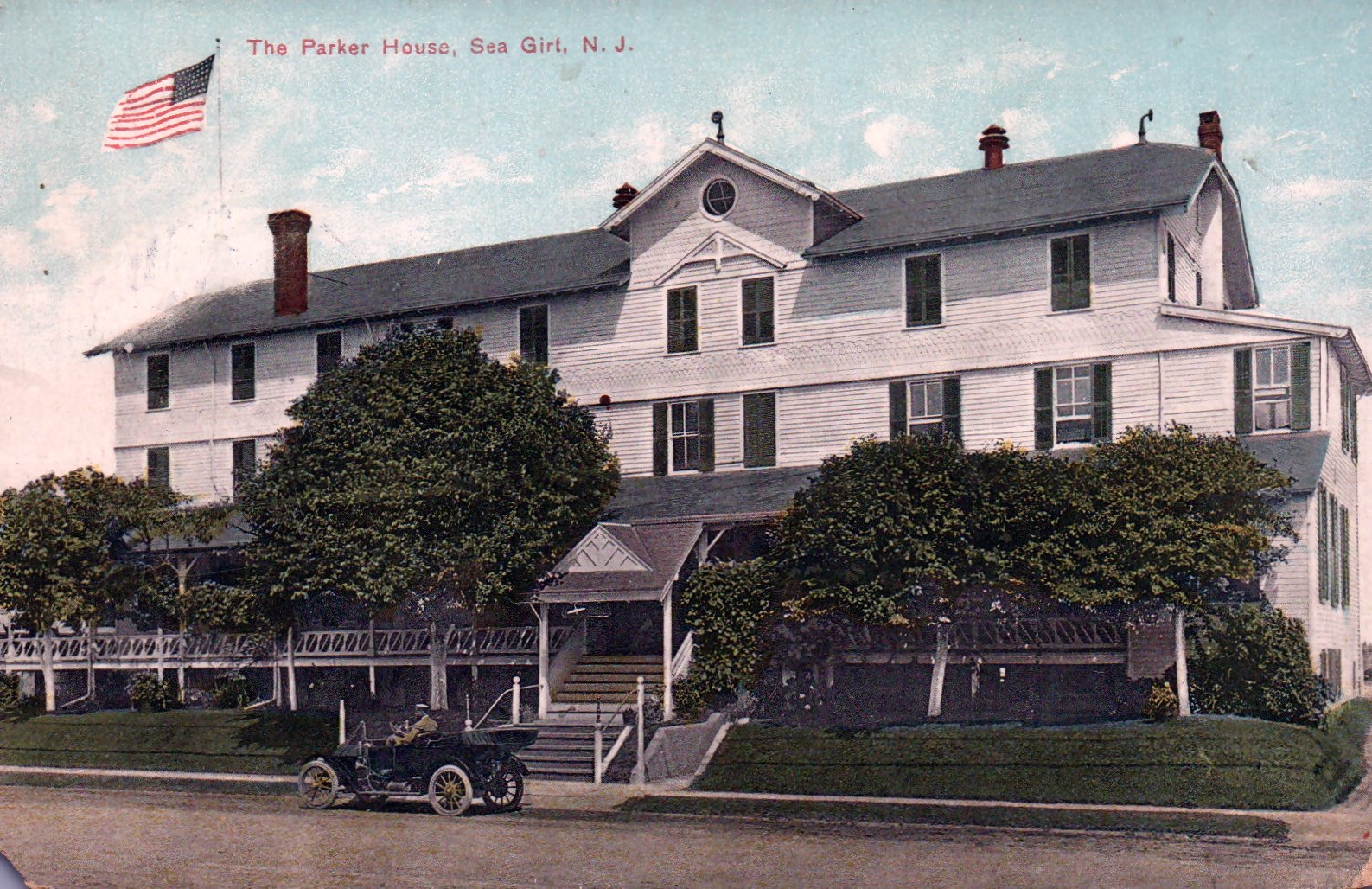
A postcard from 1913 depicting the Parker House

Devlin continued to run the operation through April 1894, when he died following a protracted illness. His widow took over the operation of the business. By the summer of 1925, however, the Parker House had been renamed to the Arnold Hotel and transferred to D. L. Arnold. It did not remain in the possession of Arnold for long; the Arnold Hotel was purchased by P. and T. Lindgren, who restored the hotel's name to the Parker House for the summer season of 1930.

The year following the end of Prohibition in the United States, the Parker House was granted a liquor license. Following a change in the liquor laws of the Borough of Sea Girt allowing hotels to possess liquor licenses for the summer season, the business acquired its seasonal retail consumption liquor license in 1935. The Parker House maintains a seasonal liquor license.

The building and business was sold in 1978 from its owners to a trio of business partners: Henry Wright, Jay Pandolfe, and Frank Matthews. Shortly before their purchase of the establishment, the original leather-bound guest book of the Parker House hotel was stolen. Soon after the trio purchased the establishment, the Borough of Sea Girt sought to restrict the sorts of live music that could be played after receiving noise complaints from town residents, passing an ordinance to ban disco and rock bands in 1979. The Parker House's owners contested the ordinance in court, and the ordinance's genre-specific ban was later struck down by New Jersey Superior Court judge Patrick J. McGann Jr., who labeled the ordinance "silly".

== Facilities ==
=== Bar and restaurant ===
During the summer, the Parker House offers season-long room rentals, and is operated as a bar and restaurant. There are bars on the main floor, the Parker House's back porch and in the facility's basement; the black-and-white-tiled main floor has capacity to hold up to 334 standing patrons, the outdoor back porch has capacity to hold up to 141, and the hardwood-floored basement of the facility—the Parker Tavern, also called God's Basement—can hold up to 517. The outdoor porch contains a raw bar, while the basement is the venue for frequent live music entertainment during the summer months. The New York Times stated in a 2017 review of the Parker House that, while the atmosphere of the Parker House is relaxed during the daytime, the building becomes a "throbbing epicenter of summer parties" in the evenings. The cash-only establishment's ten bars, manned on weekends by seventeen bartenders, close at 11:30 pm—a relatively early closing time for establishments of this sort down the Jersey Shore.

The Spring Laker, a cocktail composed of Red Bull, vodka, and pineapple juice, is the Parker House's signature drink.

=== Summer rentals ===
While the Parker House does not function as a hotel, it has thirty-two rooms for rent when in-season—between Memorial Day and Labor Day—on its two uppermost floors as of 2017. Six of these rooms have private bathrooms, while the remainder have access to communal bathrooms. The New York Times listed the price of the rentals as being between $3,800 and $4,200 in 2017.

=== Exterior and surroundings ===
The Parker House is a mansion built in the Victorian style. The building itself is adorned with white-painted wood siding. The building is surrounded by a residential neighborhood and the building's commercial use predates the area's modern zoning regulations.
