= Parker House (Haven Street, Reading, Massachusetts) =

Historic house in Massachusetts, United States

- U.S. National Register of Historic Places
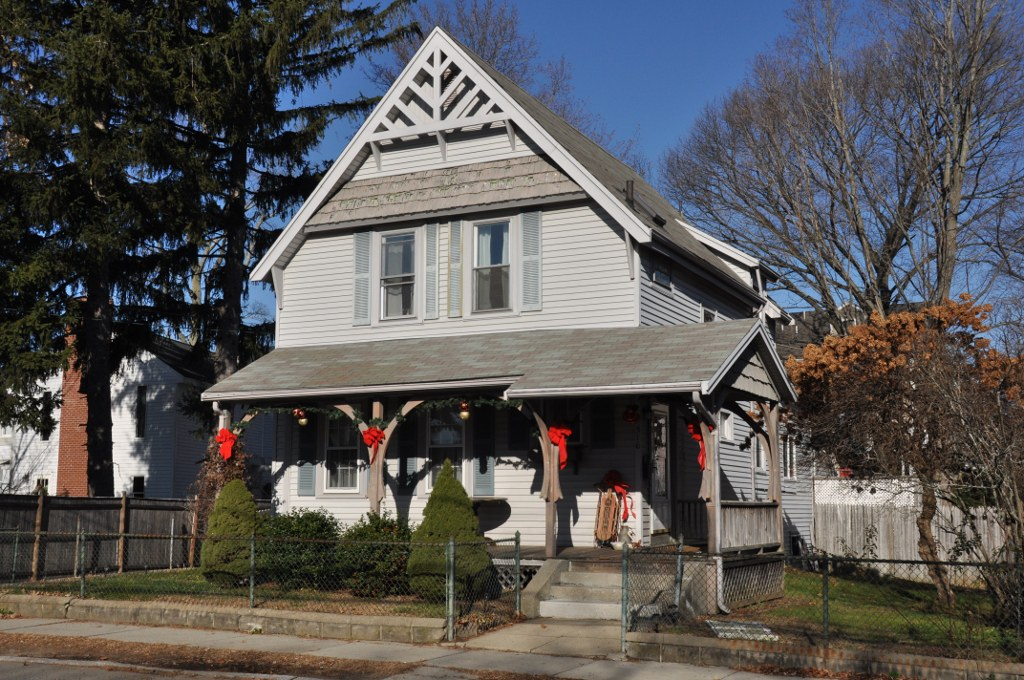

- Location within Massachusetts Location within the United States
- Location: 316 Haven Street, Reading, Massachusetts
- Coordinates: 42°31′24.14″N 71°6′2.63″W
- Built: 1881
- Architectural style: Stick/Eastlake, Queen Anne
- MPS: Reading MRA
- NRHP reference No.: 84002778
- Added to NRHP: July 19, 1984

The Parker House is a historic house in Reading, Massachusetts. It is a two-story wood-frame cottage, two bays wide, with a front-facing gable roof, clapboard siding, and a side entrance accessed from its wraparound porch. It is a well-preserved example Queen Anne/Stick style, with high style features that are unusual for a relatively modest house size. Its front gable end is embellished with Stick style woodwork resembling half-timbering, and the porch is supported by basket-handle brackets.

The house was listed on the National Register of Historic Places in 1984.

== See also ==
- Parker House (Salem Street, Reading, Massachusetts)
- National Register of Historic Places listings in Reading, Massachusetts
- National Register of Historic Places listings in Middlesex County, Massachusetts
