= Capt. Nathaniel Parker Red House =

Historic house in Massachusetts, United States

- U.S. National Register of Historic Places
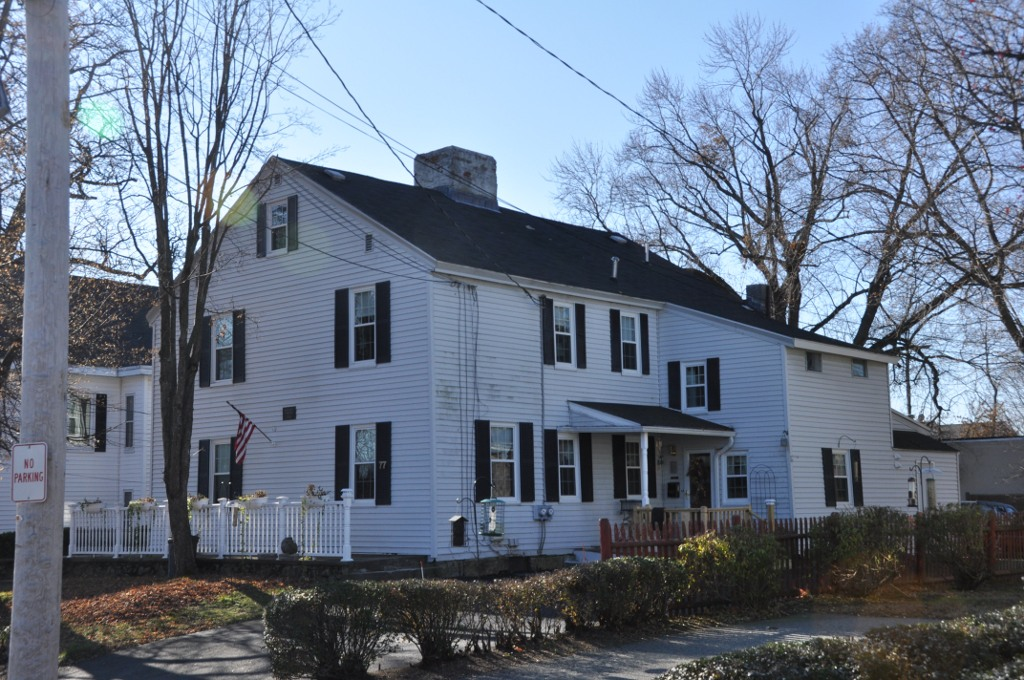

- Location within Massachusetts Location within the United States
- Location: Reading, Massachusetts
- Coordinates: 42°31′20″N 71°6′16″W
- Built: 1765
- Architectural style: Georgian
- MPS: Reading MRA
- NRHP reference No.: 84002772
- Added to NRHP: July 19, 1984

The Capt. Nathaniel Parker Red House is a historic house at 77–83 Ash Street in Reading, Massachusetts. It is a 2 1/2-story vernacular Georgian house, five bays wide, with entrances on its north and south facades. The southern entry is slightly more elegant, with flanking pilasters and a transom window. The house was built sometime before 1755, and was already a well-known landmark because it was (unusually for the time) painted, and served as a tavern on the coach road. The tavern served as a meeting place for many revolutionaries and minute men, notably the Marquis de Lafayette and Alexander Hamilton. The house remained in the hands of militia captain Nathaniel Parker and his descendants into the late 19th century. The construction of the Andover Turnpike (now Main Street) in 1806–07, bypassing its location, prompted a decline in the tavern's business.

The house was added to the National Register of Historic Places in 1984.

== See also ==
- National Register of Historic Places listings in Reading, Massachusetts
- National Register of Historic Places listings in Middlesex County, Massachusetts
