= Parker House (Salem Street, Reading, Massachusetts) =

Historic house in Massachusetts, United States

- U.S. National Register of Historic Places
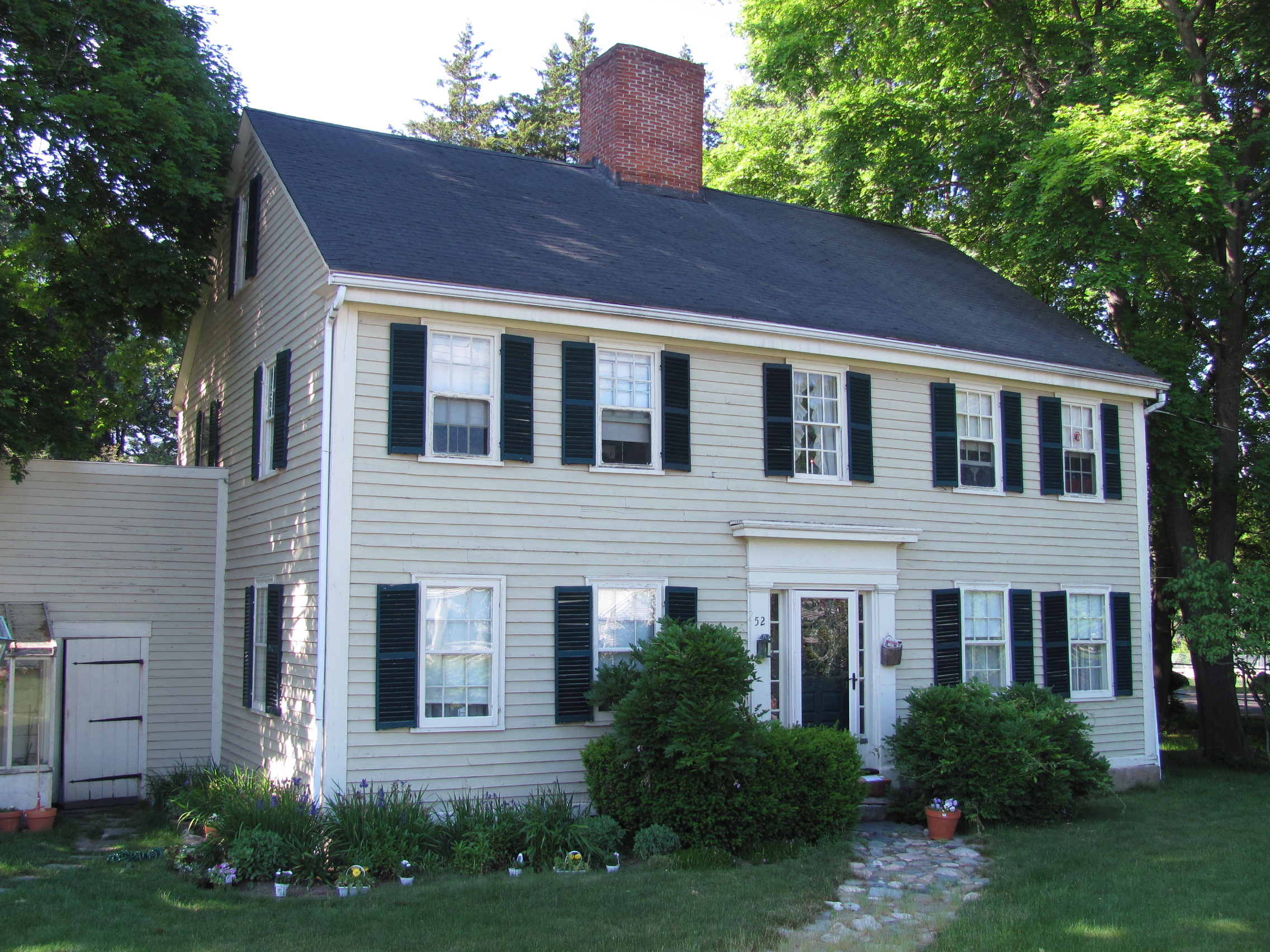

- Location within Massachusetts Location within the United States
- Location: 52 Salem St., Reading, Massachusetts
- Coordinates: 42°31′35.18″N 71°6′0.54″W
- Built: 1792
- Architectural style: Federal
- MPS: Reading MRA
- NRHP reference No.: 84002774
- Added to NRHP: July 19, 1984

The Parker House is a historic house at 52 Salem Street in Reading, Massachusetts. It is a 2 1/2-story vernacular Federal-style wood-frame house, five bays wide, with a side gable roof, clapboard siding, and a granite foundation. Its center entrance is particularly fine, with tall sidelight windows flanked by pilasters, and topped by an entablature with a shallow hood. The house was built in 1792, although its center chimney may date from an older house built on the site in 1715. Jonas Parker, the builder, was active in the American Revolution. A portion of Parker's farm was dedicated as Memorial Park in 1919.

The house was listed on the National Register of Historic Places in 1984.

== See also ==
- Parker House (Haven Street, Reading, Massachusetts)
- National Register of Historic Places listings in Reading, Massachusetts
- National Register of Historic Places listings in Middlesex County, Massachusetts
