= John Parker Tavern =

- U.S. National Register of Historic Places
- New Jersey Register of Historic Places
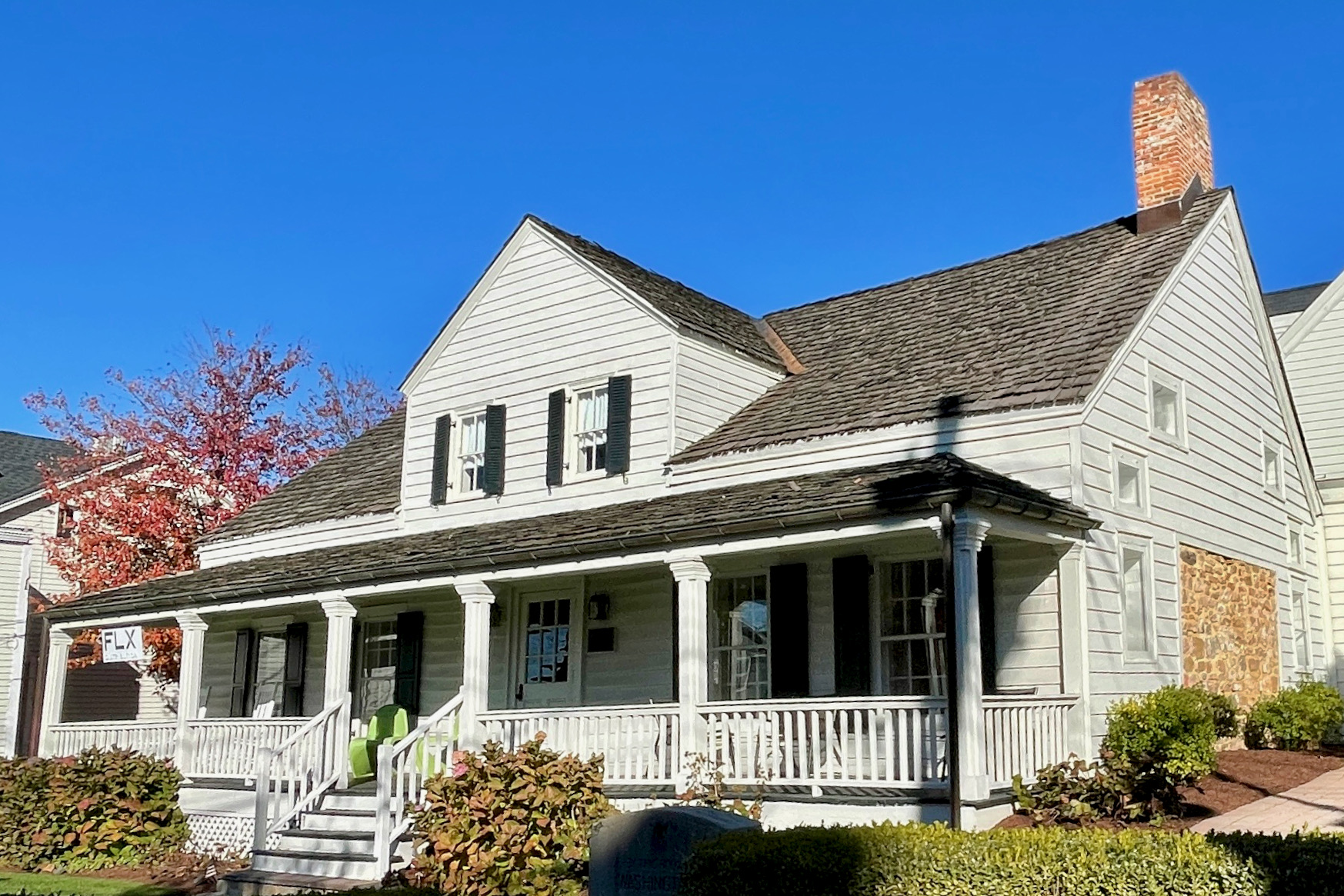

- Location within Somerset County, New Jersey Location within New Jersey Location within the United States
- Location: 2 Morristown Road, Bernardsville, New Jersey
- Coordinates: 40°43′07″N 74°34′06″W
- Area: 0.5 acres (0.20 ha)
- NRHP reference No.: 78001796
- NJRHP No.: 2479

Significant dates
- Added to NRHP: December 14, 1978
- Designated NJRHP: April 15, 1978

The John Parker Tavern is a historic building located at 2 Morristown Road (U.S. Route 202) in the borough of Bernardsville in Somerset County, New Jersey. Originally known as the Vealtown Tavern, it was frequently used by Continental Army soldiers during the American Revolutionary War. It was added to the National Register of Historic Places on December 14, 1978 for its significance in commerce, military history, and local history.

== History ==
While the exact date of construction is unknown, the tavern was built before the Revolutionary War and owned by Captain John Parker (1747–1781) until his death. American General Anthony Wayne was a frequent guest while in the area. Another guest, known as Dr. Byram, was really Aaron Wilde, a British spy in the area, who was eventually captured and hanged as a spy. It continued operating as a tavern until 1840, when it was sold to Roderick Alexander Kitchell, who used it as a private residence. In 1903, the building became the Bernardsville Public Library. In 1999, it was sold for commercial use.

== Description ==
The tavern is a one and one-half story structure with a gable roof and a one story full length portico. It was modified in 1903, with a one story addition in the rear and in 1969, with a two story addition.

== See also ==
- National Register of Historic Places listings in Somerset County, New Jersey
