= John Parker House (Boise, Idaho) =

Historic building in Boise, Idaho

- U.S. National Register of Historic Places
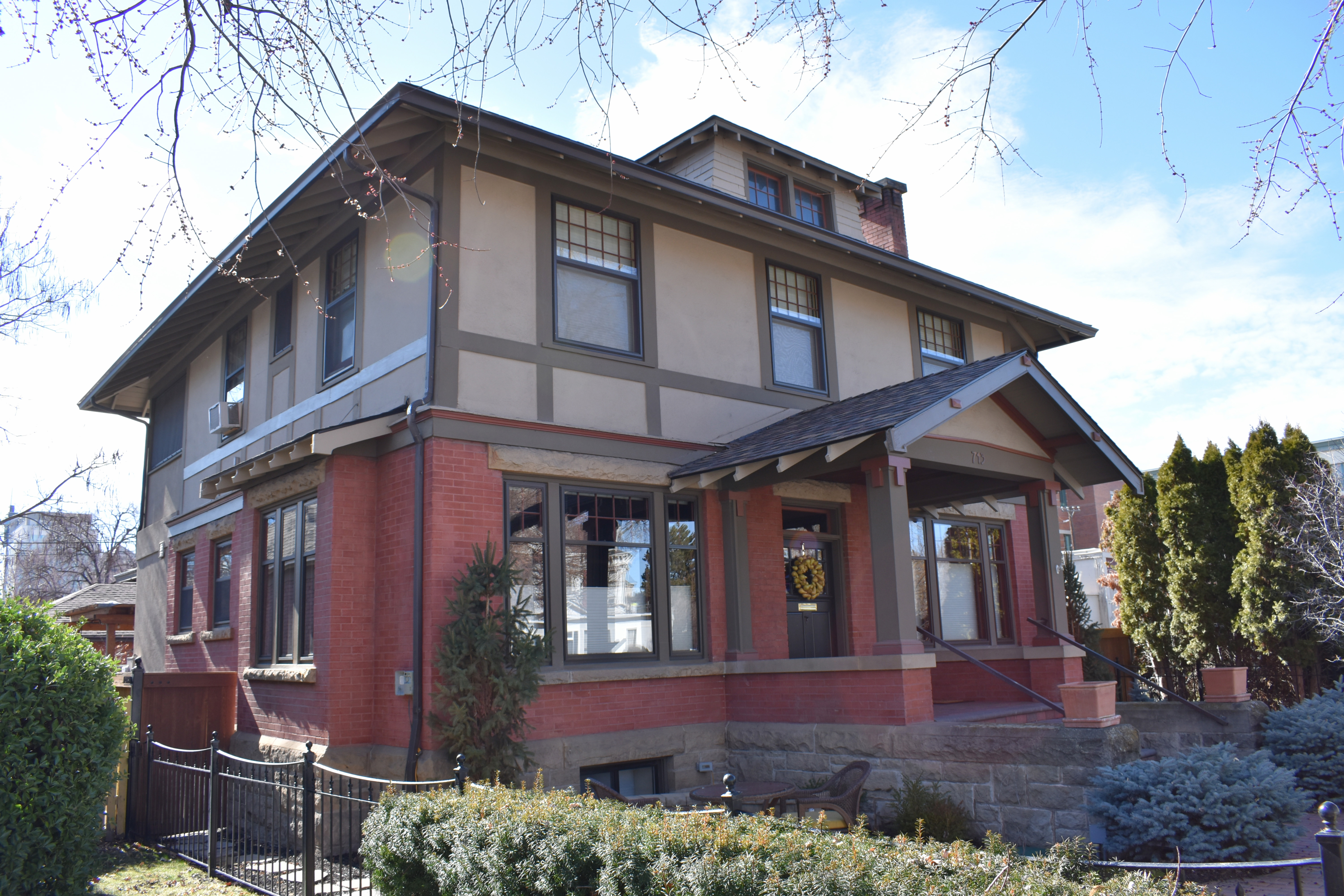
- The John Parker House in 2019

- Location within Idaho Location within the United States
- Location: 713 Franklin St., Boise, Idaho
- Coordinates: 43°37′12″N 116°11′51″W
- Area: less than one acre
- Built: 1911
- Built by: Storey & Murphy
- Architect: Tourtellotte & Hummel
- Architectural style: Bungalow/craftsman
- MPS: Tourtellotte and Hummel Architecture TR
- NRHP reference No.: 82000231
- Added to NRHP: November 17, 1982

The John Parker House in Boise, Idaho, is a 2-story bungalow designed by Tourtellotte & Hummel and constructed in 1911. The house features a sandstone foundation and brick veneer surrounding the first floor, with a half-timber second floor infilled with stucco. An outset front porch is a prominent feature, supporting a gabled roof by two square posts. The hip roof above the second floor includes a single dormer with battered, shingled sides. The house was listed on the National Register of Historic Places in 1982.

John S. Parker and his brother, Steven Parker, were owners of Boise's Olympic Saloon at 816 Main Street (demolished). In 1909 Parker was president of the Boise Retail Liquor Dealer's Association, and the group drafted a set of seven resolutions to promote decency and morality. Among the resolutions was a prohibition against the "morning free drink."

In 1915 Parker sold the John Parker House to Ernest Noble, and in 1916 Parker bought a saloon in Butte, Montana.

== See also ==
- Fort Street Historic District
