= Samuel Parker House (Reading, Massachusetts) =

Historic house in Massachusetts, United States

- U.S. National Register of Historic Places
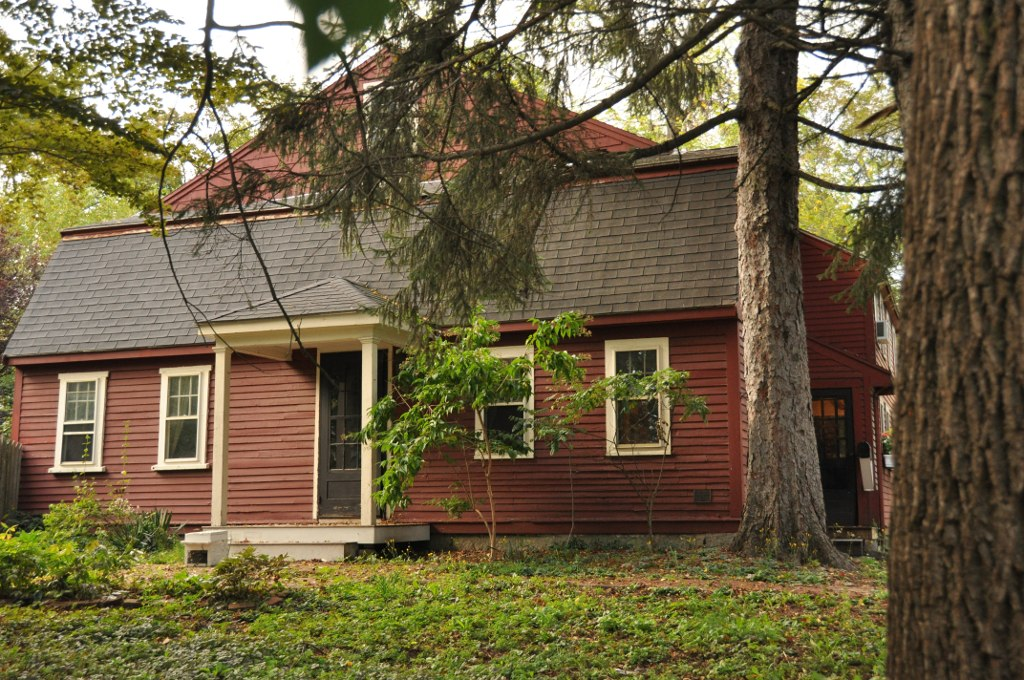

- Location within Massachusetts Location within the United States
- Location: 132 West Street, Reading, Massachusetts
- Coordinates: 42°30′50″N 71°7′17″W
- Built: 1795
- Architectural style: Georgian
- MPS: Reading MRA
- NRHP reference No.: 84002783
- Added to NRHP: July 19, 1984

The Samuel Parker House is a historic house in Reading, Massachusetts, United States. The front, gambrel-roofed portion of this house, was probably built in the mid-1790s, and the house as a whole reflects a vernacular Georgian-Federal style. The house is noted for a succession of working-class owners (of which Samuel Parker, a cooper, was one). Its most notable resident was Carrie Belle Kenney, one of the earliest female graduates of the Massachusetts Institute of Technology.

The house was listed on the National Register of Historic Places in 1984.

== See also ==
- National Register of Historic Places listings in Reading, Massachusetts
- National Register of Historic Places listings in Middlesex County, Massachusetts
