= John P. Parker House =

Historic house in Ohio, United States

- U.S. National Register of Historic Places
- U.S. National Historic Landmark
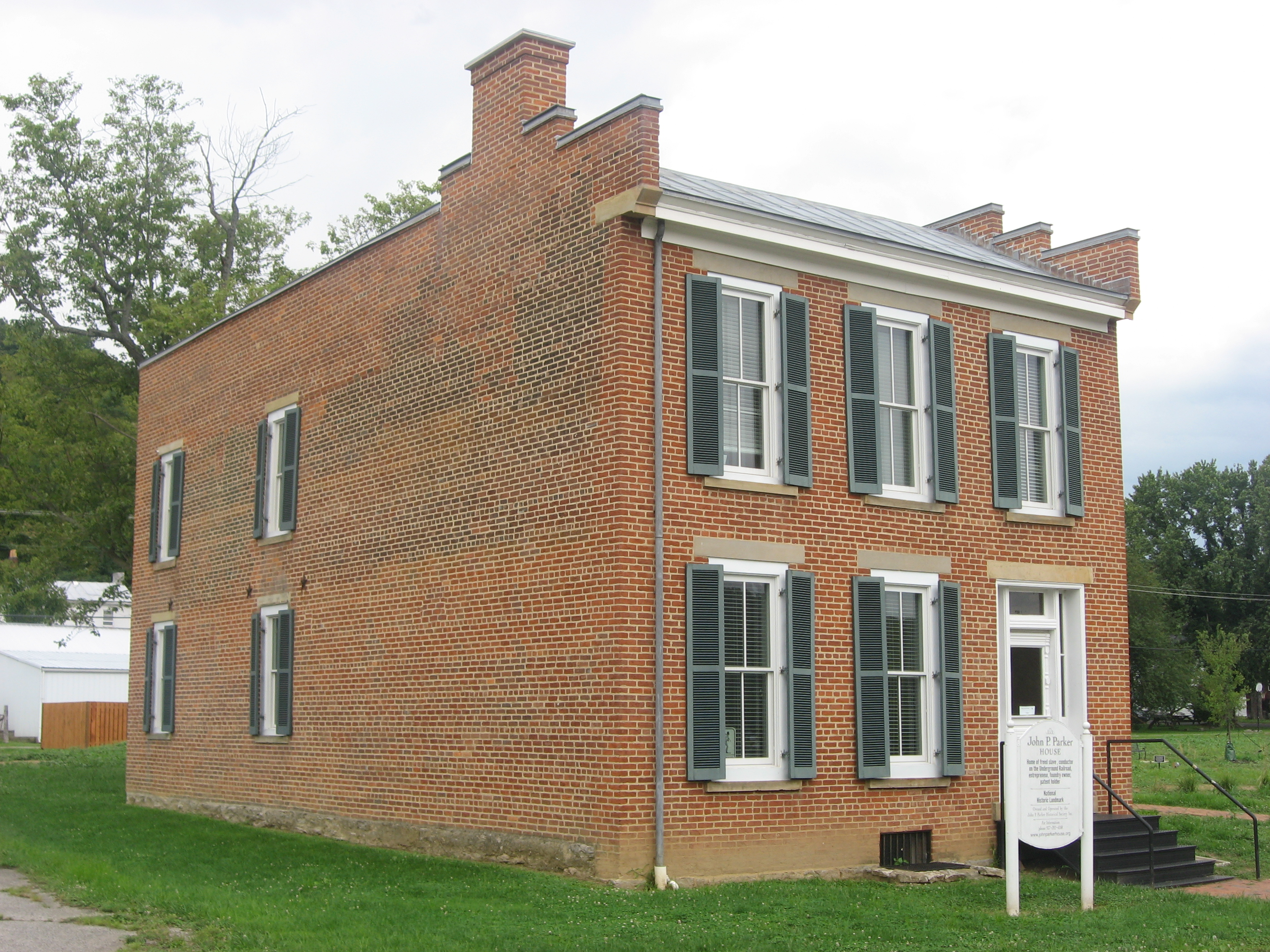
- Viewed from the northwest

- Location within Ohio Location within the United States
- Location: 300 N. Front St., Ripley, Ohio
- Coordinates: 38°45′0″N 83°50′57″W
- Area: less than one acre
- Built: c. 1853
- NRHP reference No.: 80002944, 97000340

Significant dates
- Added to NRHP: January 7, 1980
- Designated NHL: February 18, 1997

The John P. Parker House is a historic house museum at 300 North Front Street in Ripley, Ohio. It was home to former slave and inventor John P. Parker (1827–1900) from 1853 to his death in 1900. Parker was an abolitionist and a well-documented conductor on the Underground Railroad, helping hundreds of escaped slaves. The house was listed on the National Register of Historic Places in 1980, and it was further designated a National Historic Landmark in 1997. It is now owned and managed by a local nonprofit organization as a museum about Parker's life and the abolitionist movement.

== Description and history ==
The John P. Parker House is located on the Ohio River waterfront, north of the center of Ripley. It is in a relatively isolated setting, apart from other residences in Ripley, on what was once a partly industrial property. The building is a two-story brick structure, with a side gable roof that has stepped gables. A lower two-story wood-frame ell extends to the rear. The front facade is three bays wide, with the entrance in the rightmost bay, topped by a transom window. Windows are plain sash, set in rectangular openings with stone lintels.

The house is all that is left of a larger manufacturing complex built about 1853 for the business of John Parker, which originally included a machine shop, blacksmithy, and foundry. Most of these facilities were damaged or destroyed by a fire in 1889, and were not rebuilt by Parker. Ripley was a hotbed of abolitionist sentiment in the antebellum period, and it was thus a well-known target for slaves escaping across the river from Kentucky, a slave state. Although Parker's property was close to the river, he apparently rarely sheltered slaves in his home, its remote location equally attractive to fugitive slaves and slave catchers. Parker was born into slavery, but was given an education by his physician owner, and was able to purchase his freedom. He regularly crossed into Kentucky in search of escaping slaves, and brought them into the network of Underground Railroad supporters in Ripley.

The property was sold by Parker's wife not long after his death, and was used in support of a coal shipping operation for many years. In the 1990s it was purchased by a local nonprofit and rehabilitated for use as a museum.

== See also ==
- John Rankin House (Ripley, Ohio), a major Underground Railroad stop in Ripley
- List of Underground Railroad sites
- List of National Historic Landmarks in Ohio
