= Walnut Street School =

Walnut Street School may refer to:

in the United States

- Walnut Street School (Woodland, California), listed on the NRHP in California
- Walnut Street School (Evansville, Indiana), listed on the NRHP in Indiana
- Walnut Street School (Reading, Massachusetts), listed on the NRHP in Massachusetts
- Walnut Street School (Wooster, Ohio), listed on the NRHP in Ohio
