= William Parker House =

Historic house in Massachusetts, United States

- U.S. National Register of Historic Places
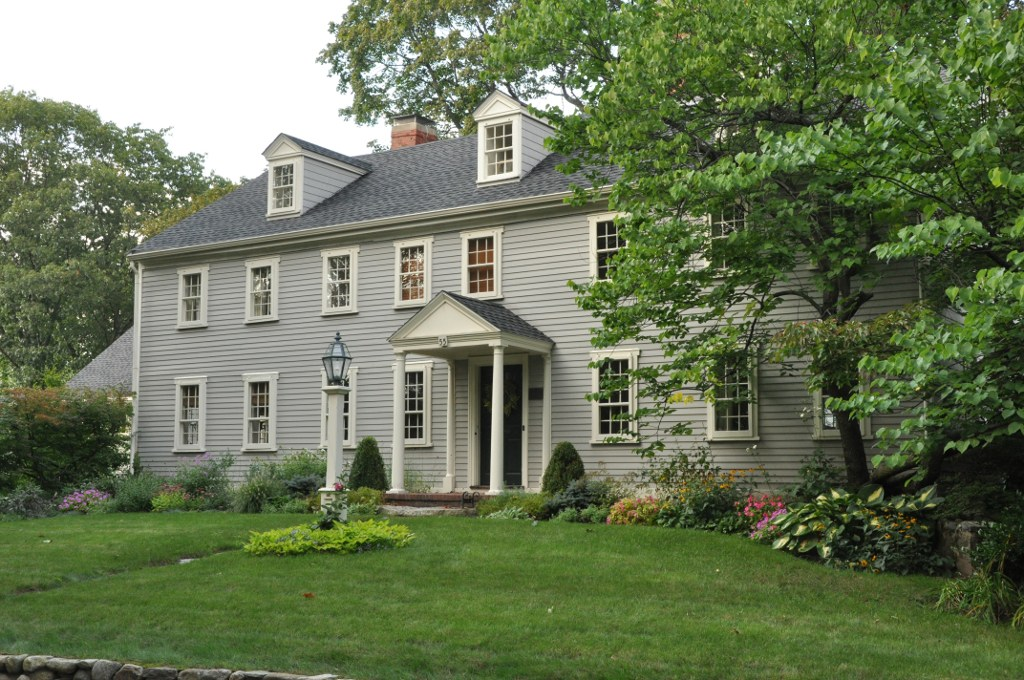

- Location within Massachusetts Location within the United States
- Location: Reading, Massachusetts
- Coordinates: 42°30′35.29″N 71°6′28.51″W
- Built: c. 1796; 1910
- Architect: Willard P. Adden (1910)
- Architectural style: Federal
- MPS: Reading MRA
- NRHP reference No.: 84002791
- Added to NRHP: July 19, 1984

The William Parker House is a historic house at 55 Walnut Street in Reading, Massachusetts. The 2 1/2-story wood-frame house was built c. 1796, was expanded early in the 19th century into a two family residence, and converted back into a single family in the early 20th century. It is notable for its association with William Parker, a dissenter from the doctrines espoused by the local Congregational Church. In 1849 he joined with other members of his extended family in splitting the congregation.

In 1910 the house was purchased by Walter Scott Hopkins, a Boston merchant. Hopkins hired a local architect, Willard P. Adden, to return the house to its original single-family configuration and restore and renovate the house for use as a family home. Hopkins only owned the house for a few years before selling it to Adden c. 1916, though he too only lived there briefly, moving in 1918. Adden later moved to Woburn Street.

The house was listed on the National Register of Historic Places in 1984.

== See also ==
- National Register of Historic Places listings in Reading, Massachusetts
- National Register of Historic Places listings in Middlesex County, Massachusetts
