= Willard P. Adden =

American architect (1868–1958)

- Born: April 9, 1868; Reading, Massachusetts, U.S.
- Died: June 14, 1958 (aged 90); Northampton, Massachusetts, U.S.
- Occupation: Architect

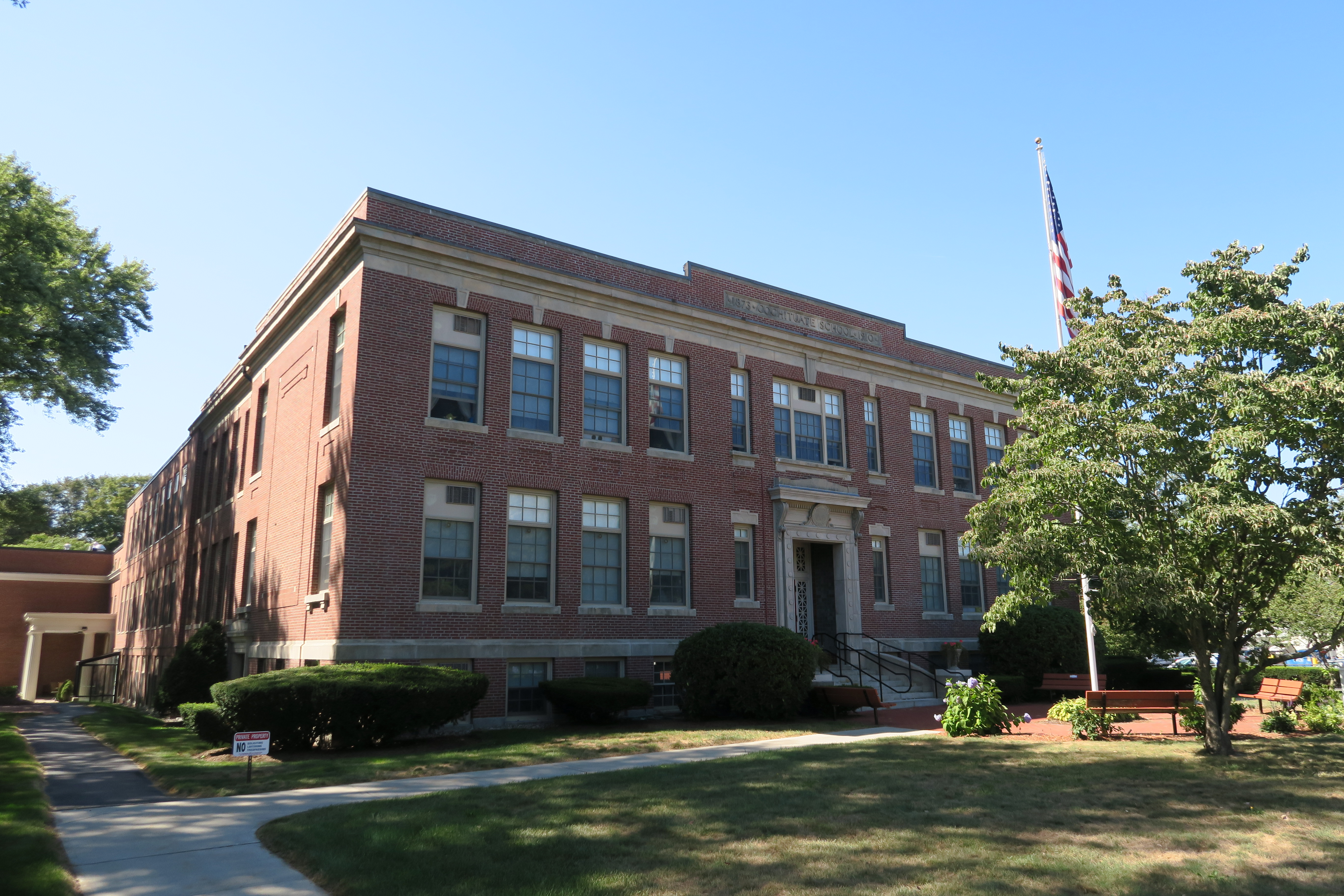
The former Cochituate School in Wayland, built in 1910.

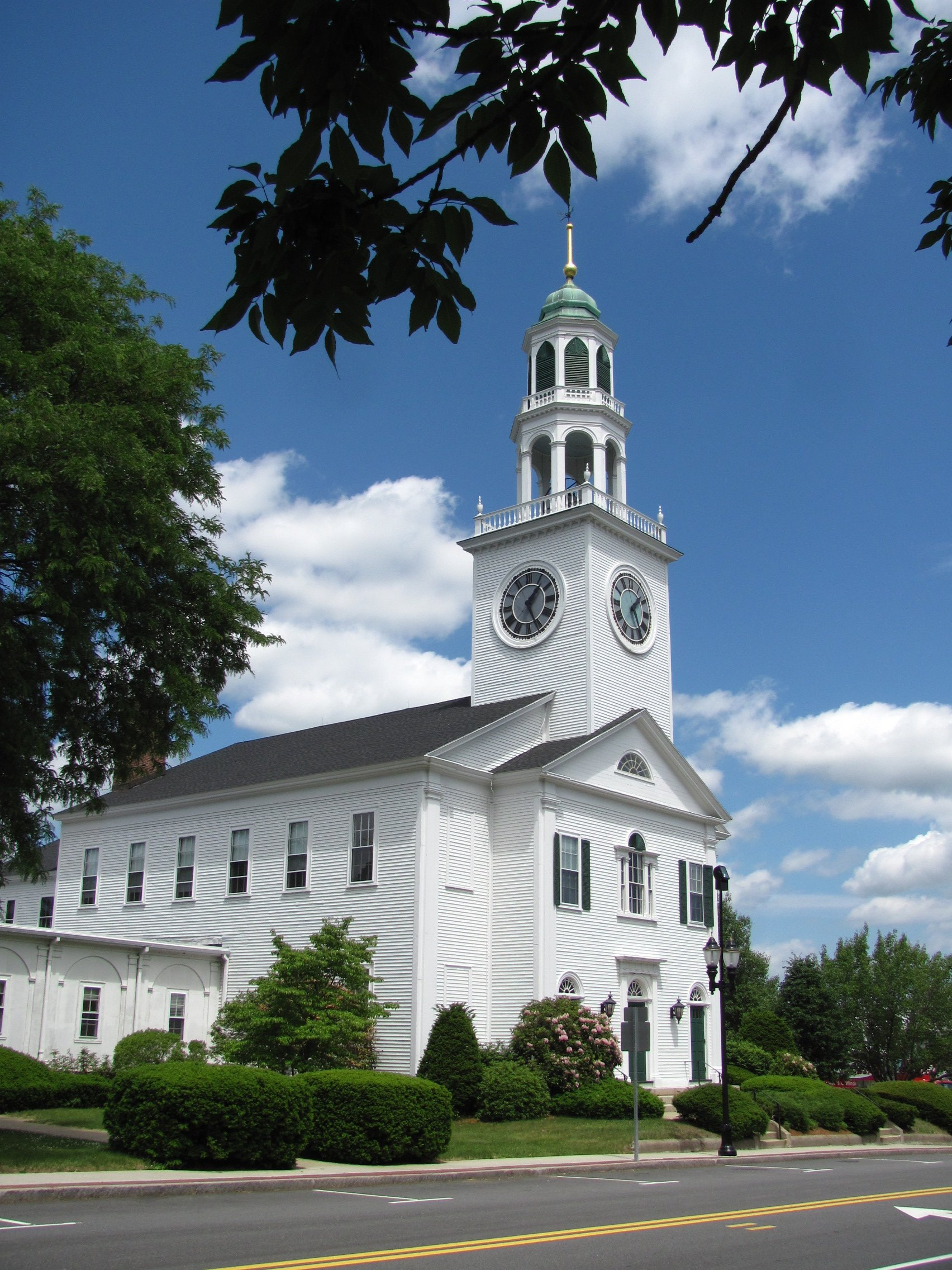
The Old South United Methodist Church in Reading, built in 1913.

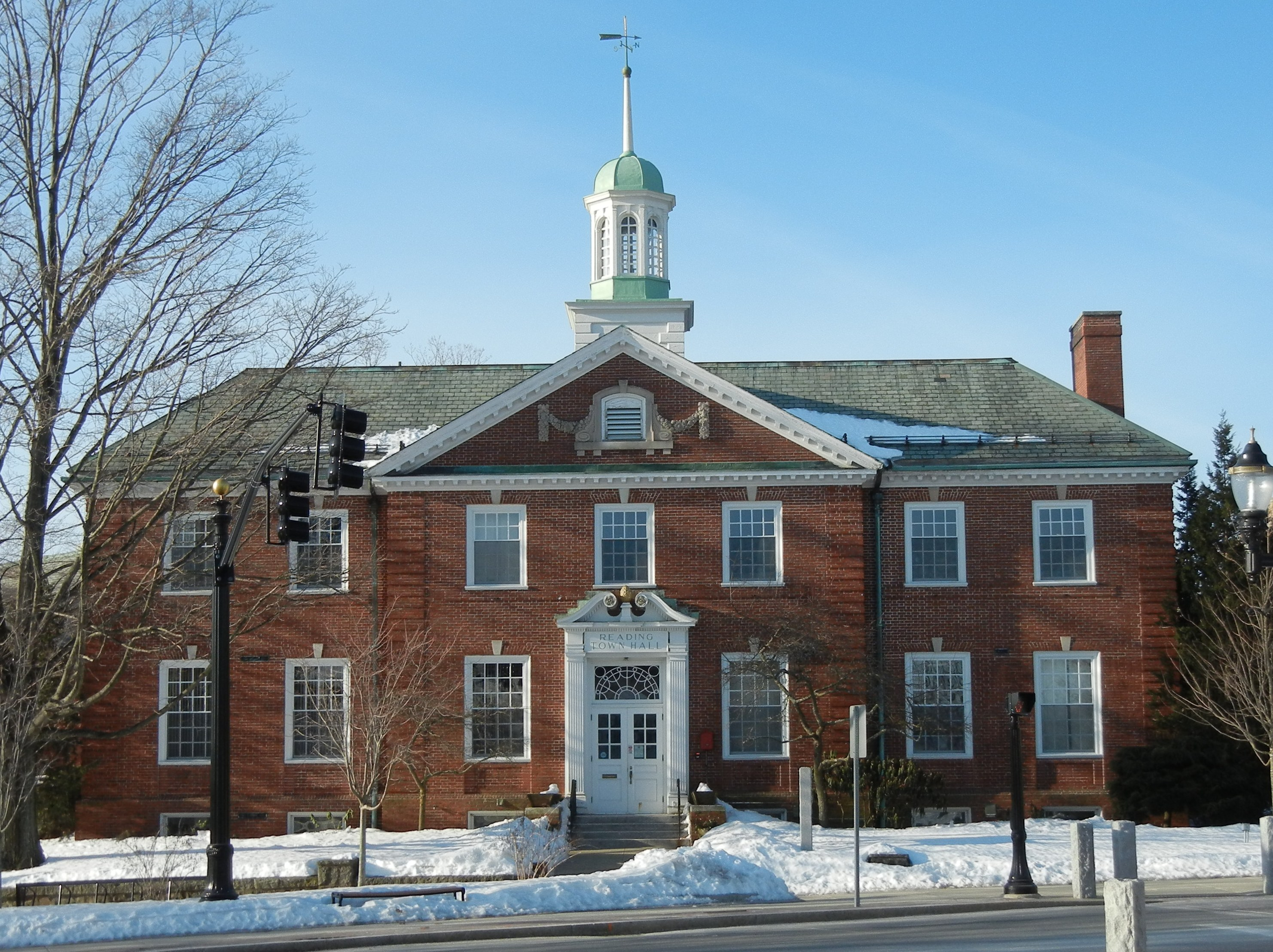
The Reading Town Hall, built in 1918.

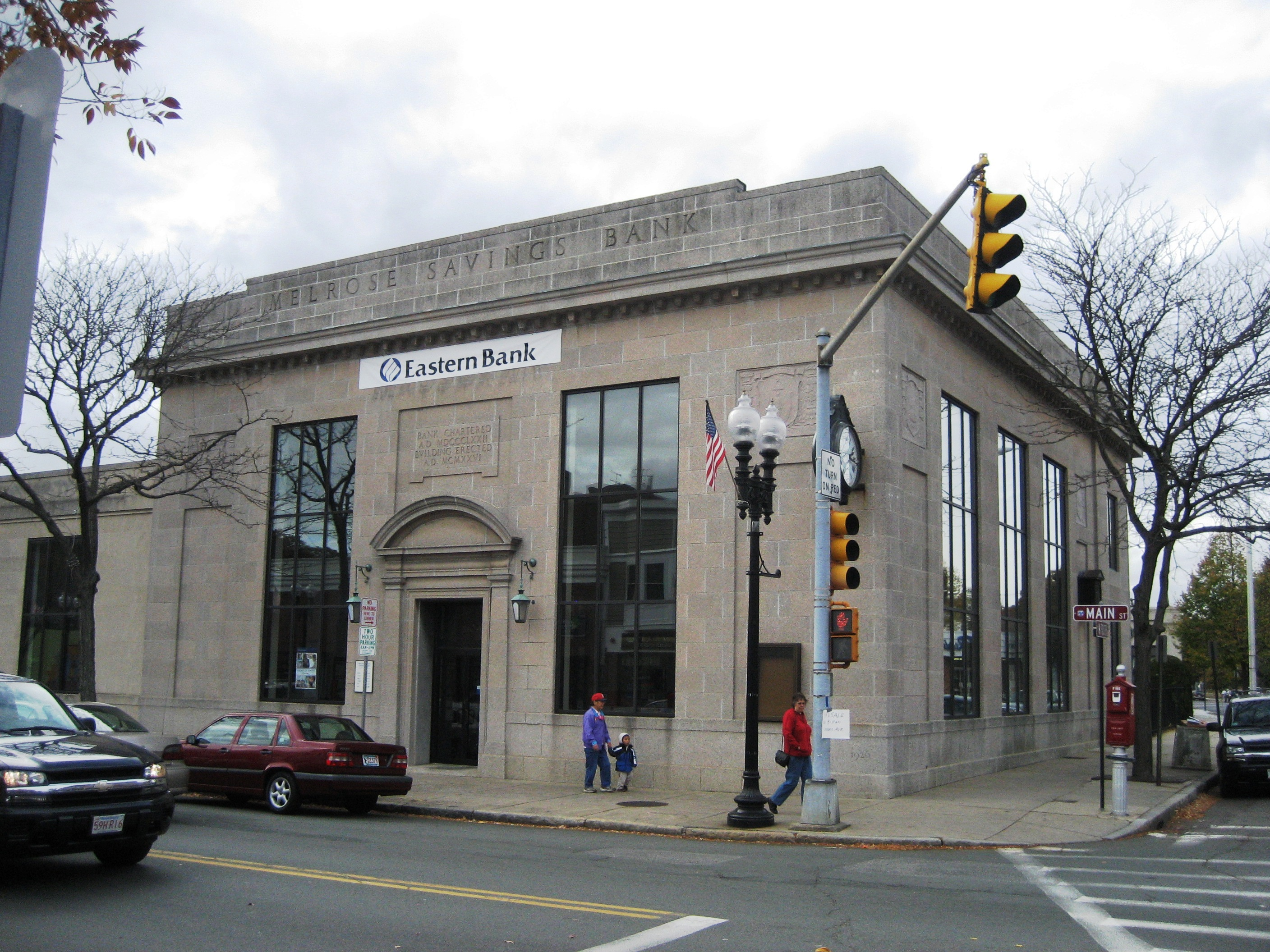
The former Melrose Savings Bank Building in Melrose, built in 1925.

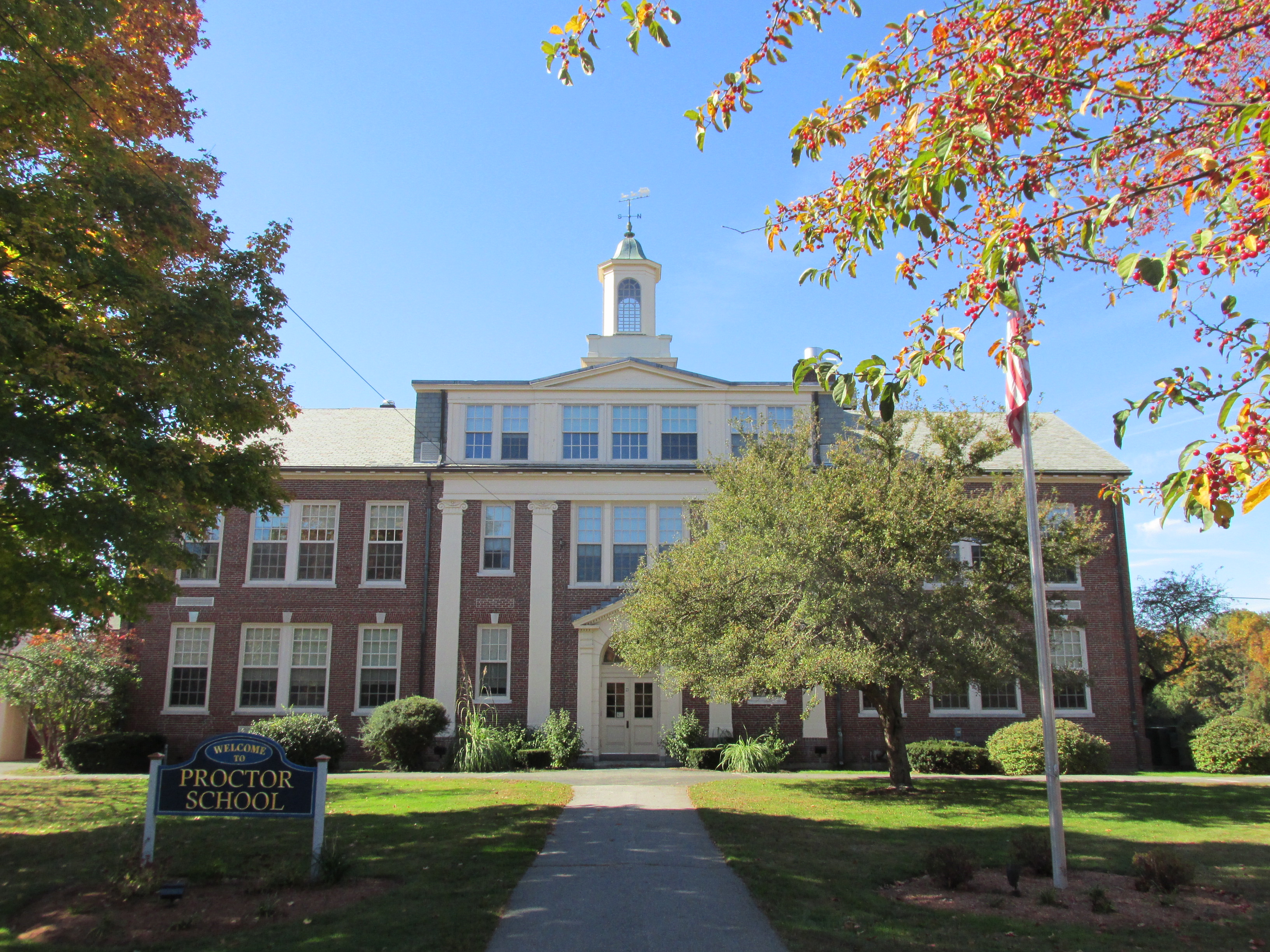
The Proctor School in Topsfield, completed in 1935.

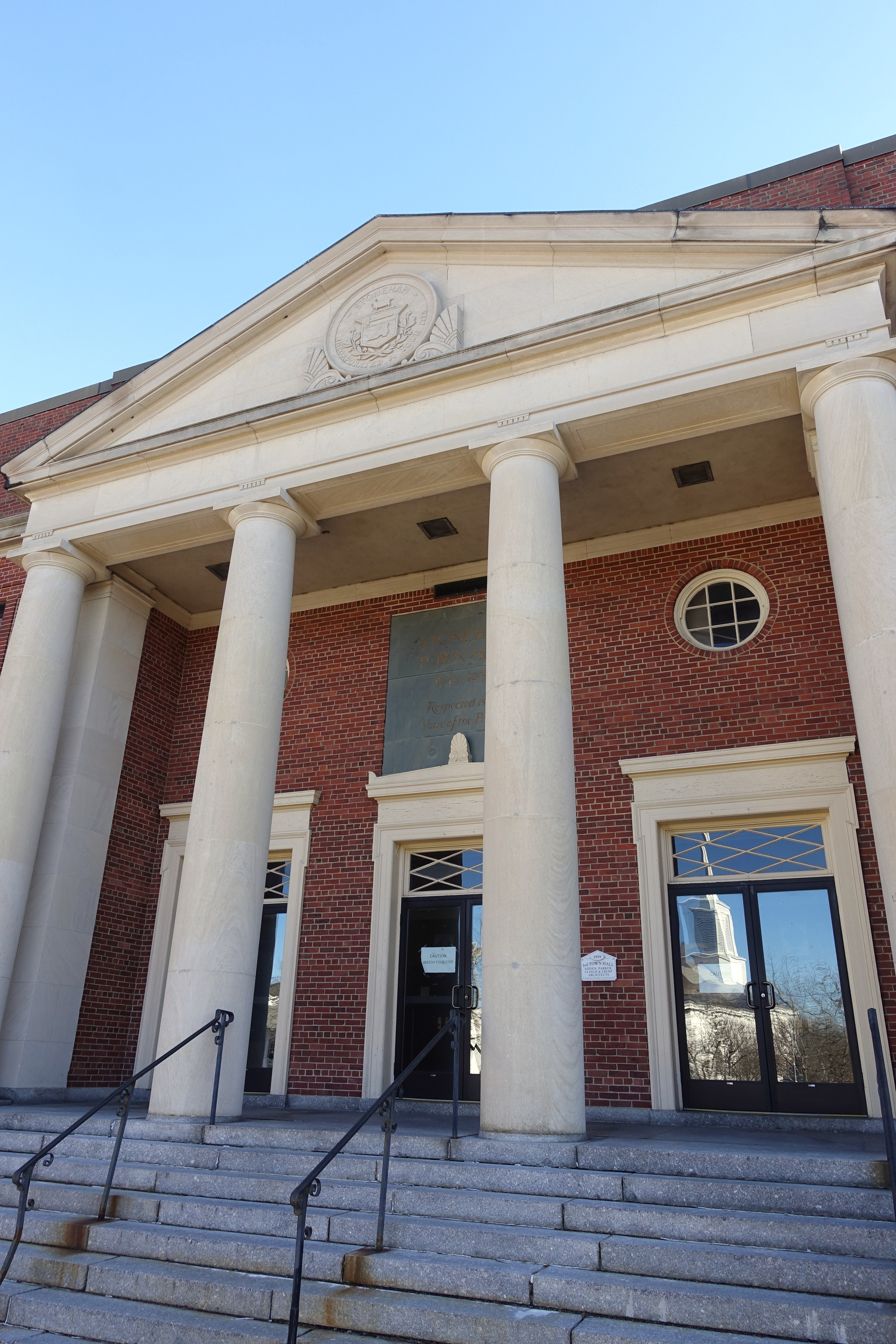
The Stoneham Town Hall, completed in 1939.

Willard P. Adden (April 9, 1868 – June 14, 1958) was an American architect in practice in Boston from 1905 until his retirement in the early 1940s.

== Life and career ==
Willard Parker Adden was born April 9, 1868, in Reading, Massachusetts to John Henry Adden and Elmira (George) Adden. He was educated in the Reading public schools. Adden's early career was spent in the office of Charles Brigham, a leading Boston architect of the late nineteenth century, where he was working as a drafter by 1890. By 1895 he was noted as an architect in Brigham's office, and was credited as codesigner of the Spafford Library in Springfield, Vermont with Springfield native Russell W. Porter, then a student at the Massachusetts Institute of Technology. Adden was also credited as codesigner for a number of projects designed by Charles Brigham, including the James Building (1899) and the former Madison Public Library (1900) in Madison, New Jersey, and the headhouse of the former Atlantic Avenue station of the Boston Elevated Railway (1904–06, demolished 1949) in Boston.

Adden left Brigham in 1905, and formed the firm of Adden & Parker with Winthrop D. Parker. Parker, an 1895 graduate of the Massachusetts Institute of Technology, had worked for Wheelwright & Haven for many years prior. Adden practiced as a member of the firm of Adden & Parker for the next twenty-five years, producing many buildings in the Colonial Revival, Beaux-Arts and other traditional revival styles. Adden was an especially popular architect in his hometown of Reading, where he designed the high school, town hall, public library and several churches. In 1929 they expanded the partnership to include Howard T. Clinch (1889–1965) and Frank W. Crimp (1899–1990), the firm being renamed Adden, Parker, Clinch & Crimp. The new partners introduced elements of modern design into the firm's work. Adden retired from practice in the 1940s.

== Personal life ==
Adden was active in both his profession and his community. The same year he joined Brigham he joined the Boston Architectural Club, a social group that also offered instruction in design and drafting. He joined the American Institute of Architects in 1923, and was a member for the rest of his life. He was a member of the Reading town planning board and the park commission, and was active in several local social groups.

Adden was married in 1907 to Annie Perry Allen of New Bedford. They had three children, two daughters and one son. Around the time of his marriage, Adden purchased what is known as the Eaton–Prescott House in Reading, and restored and renovated it as his family home. This became a theme in his life, and he restored and lived in a number of historic homes in Reading. In 1916 he moved into the William Parker House, which he had restored for a different client six years earlier. In 1918 he moved again, to the David Pratt house on Woburn Street. Where in his past renovations Adden had been careful to respect the old Colonial architecture, at the Federal-era Pratt house he created an elaborate Federal Revival fantasy, the most complex example of the style in Reading. In retirement he lived in a relatively new house on King Street. Adden died June 14, 1958, in a hospital in Northampton.

== Legacy ==
The firm Adden founded lasted for thirty years after his retirement. In 1959, after the deaths of Adden and Parker, the firm was renamed Clinch, Crimp, Brown & Fisher, the new partners being Arthur Wilbur Brown and Herbert Robson Fisher Jr. Howard T. Clinch died December 24, 1965, and the firm was incorporated as Crimp, Brown & Fisher the following year. After Crimp retired the firm became Brown, Fisher, Nickerson & Todisco with the addition of Carl Vernon Nickerson (1919–2017) and Philip John Todisco (1923–2007) in 1970. By 1972 Todisco had left, and the firm of Brown, Fisher & Nickerson was dissolved in 1979.

Adden was responsible for the restoration of several Colonial-era buildings in Reading. These, as well of some of his own works, have been listed on the United States National Register of Historic Places. Others contribute to listed historic districts.

== Architectural works ==
- Congregational Church of Laconia, 18 Veterans Sq, Laconia, New Hampshire (1905–06)
- Ossian Wilbur Goss Reading Room, 188 Elm St, Lakeport, New Hampshire (1905–07, NRHP 1986)
- Reading High School (former), (Note: A contributing property to the Common Historic District, NRHP-listed in 1985.) 52 Sanborn St, Reading, Massachusetts (1905–06)
- Eaton–Prescott House restoration, (Note: Adden's home from circa 1907 to 1916.) 284 Summer Ave, Reading, Massachusetts (circa 1907, NRHP 1984)
- Huntington High School (former), 100 Main St, Huntington, New York (1908)
- First Congregational Church, 25 Woburn St, Reading, Massachusetts (1909–11)
- Cochituate School (former), 106 Main St, Wayland, Massachusetts (1910)
- William Parker House restoration, (Note: Adden's home from 1916 to 1918.) 55 Walnut St, Reading, Massachusetts (1910, NRHP 1984)
- Old South United Methodist Church, 6 Salem St, Reading, Massachusetts (1911–13)
- Roosevelt School, 155 Lowndes Ave, Huntington, New York (1913, demolished)
- Merchants National Bank Building, (Note: Adden's father-in-law, Gilbert Allen, was president of this bank for ten years. A contributing property to the Central New Bedford Historic District, NRHP-listed in 1980.) 95 William St, New Bedford, Massachusetts (1914–16)
- Fred Clark house, (Note: A contributing property to the Everett Avenue–Sheffield Road Historic District, NRHP-listed in 1989.) 6 Everett Ave, Winchester, Massachusetts (1915–16)
- Reading Town Hall, 16 Lowell St, Reading, Massachusetts (1916–18)
- Reading Public Library (former), 6 Lowell St, Reading, Massachusetts (1917–18)
- David Pratt house restoration, (Note: Adden's home after 1918. A contributing property to the Woburn Street Historic District, NRHP-listed in 1985.) 217 Woburn St, Reading, Massachusetts (1918)
- American Woolen Company administration building, (Note: A contributing property to the Shawsheen Village Historic District, NRHP-listed in 1979.) 16 Balmoral St, Andover, Massachusetts (1922–23)
- James T. Murray house, (Note: A contributing property to the County Street Historic District, NRHP-listed in 1987.) 41 Orchard St, New Bedford, Massachusetts (1922)
- Beverly High School (former), 7 Sohier Rd, Beverly, Massachusetts (1923–25)
- Parker Tavern restoration, 103 Washington St, Reading, Massachusetts (1923–30, NRHP 1975)
- Melrose Savings Bank Building, 476 Main St, Melrose, Massachusetts (1926)
- Manter Hall School (former), 71 Mount Auburn St, Cambridge, Massachusetts (1927)
- Walter S. Parker Junior High School, 45 Temple St, Reading, Massachusetts (1927, demolished)
- Elmer L. Wengren house, (Note: A contributing property to the Western Promenade Historic District, NRHP-listed in 1984.) 22 Chadwick St, Portland, Maine (1928)
- Edward K. Hall house, 35 Rope Ferry Rd, Hanover, New Hampshire (1930)
- Reading Police Station, 67 Pleasant St, Reading, Massachusetts (1930–31, demolished)
- Huntley N. Spaulding house, (Note: A contributing property to the Little Boar's Head Historic District, NRHP-listed in 1999.) 58 Ocean Blvd, North Hampton, New Hampshire (1930–32)
- Proctor School, 60 Main St, Topsfield, Massachusetts (1934–35)
- Leavitt House, (Note: A contributing property to the Vermont Academy Campus Historic District, NRHP-listed in 2015.) Vermont Academy, Saxtons River, Vermont (1936)
- Stoneham Town Hall, 35 Central St, Stoneham, Massachusetts (1938–39)
- David Walton house, (Note: A contributing property to the Longwood Historic District, NRHP-listed in 1978.) 310 Kent St, Brookline, Massachusetts (1939)
