= House at 57 Woburn Street =

Historic house in Massachusetts, United States

- U.S. National Register of Historic Places
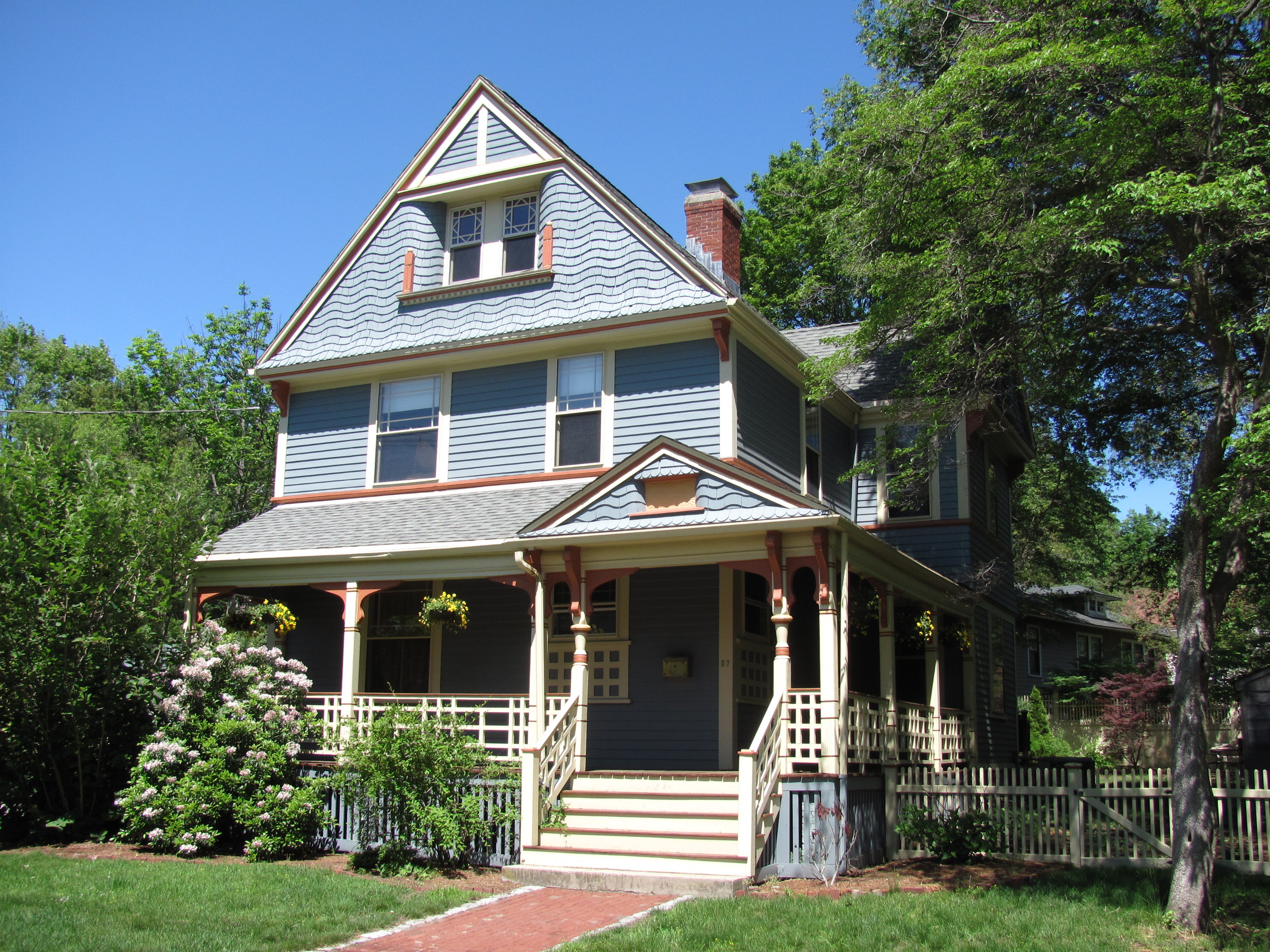

- Location within Massachusetts Location within the United States
- Location: Reading, Massachusetts
- Coordinates: 42°31′27.44″N 71°6′21.63″W
- Built: 1887
- Architect: Wadlin, Horace G.
- Architectural style: Queen Anne
- MPS: Reading MRA
- NRHP reference No.: 84002657
- Added to NRHP: July 19, 1984

The House at 57 Woburn Street in Reading, Massachusetts is a Queen Anne style house designed by architect Horace G. Wadlin and built c. 1889 for Alfred Danforth, railroad employee who served for a time as Reading's town clerk. It is one of the town's more elaborate Queen Anne houses, with patterned shingles and an ornately decorated porch. The front-facing gable is particularly elaborate, with wave-form shingling and a pair of sash windows set in a curved recess.

The house was added to the National Register of Historic Places in 1984.

== See also ==
- Woburn Street Historic District
- National Register of Historic Places listings in Reading, Massachusetts
- National Register of Historic Places listings in Middlesex County, Massachusetts
