= House at 199 Summer Avenue =

Historic house in Massachusetts, United States

- U.S. National Register of Historic Places
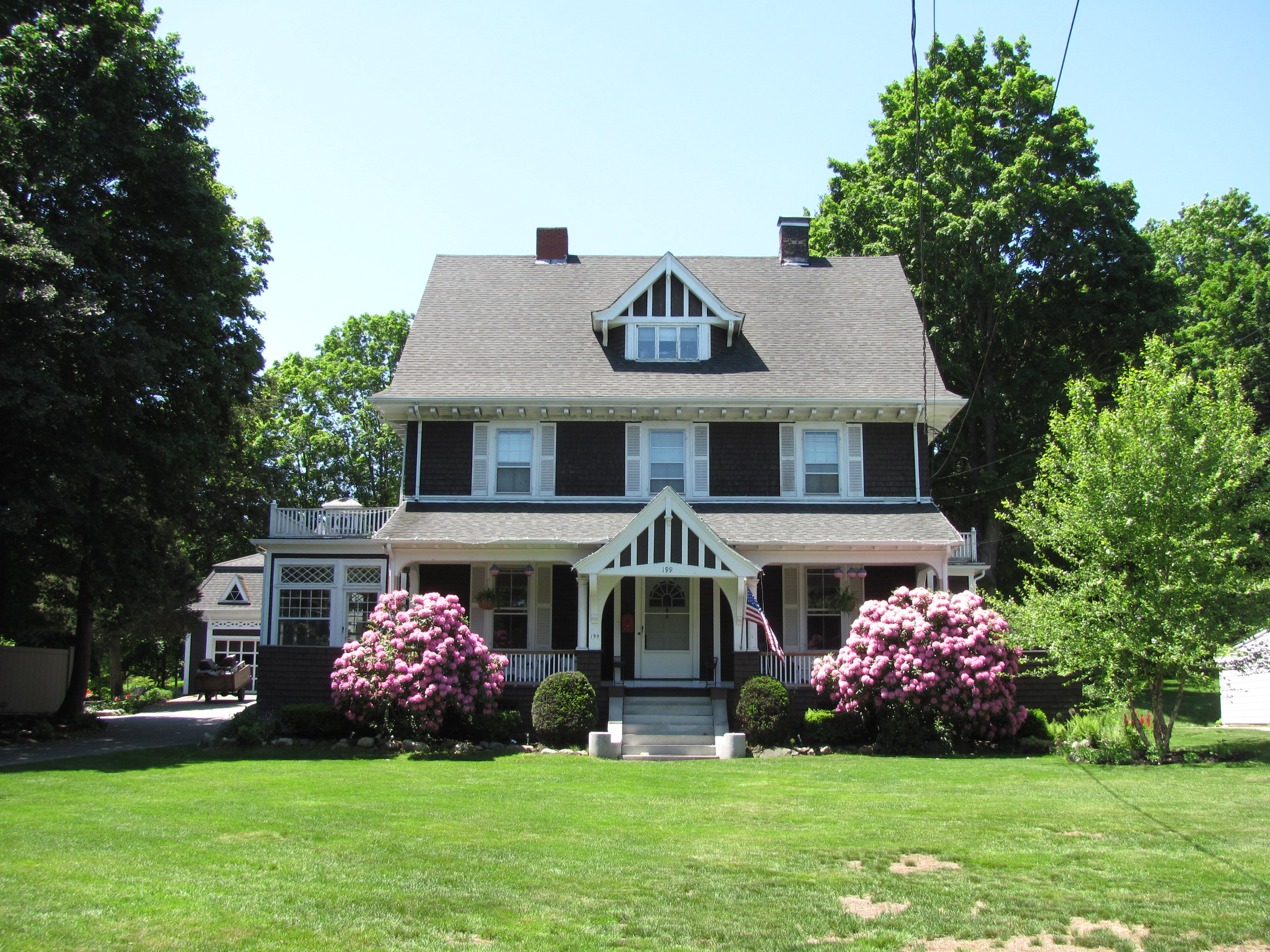

- Location within Massachusetts Location within the United States
- Location: Reading, Massachusetts
- Coordinates: 42°31′15.94″N 71°7′0.64″W
- Built: 1878
- Architect: Wadlin, Horace G.
- Architectural style: Second Empire, Tudor Revival
- MPS: Reading MRA
- NRHP reference No.: 84002667
- Added to NRHP: July 19, 1984

The House at 199 Summer Avenue in Reading, Massachusetts is designated as historic. The original two-and-a-half-story house was designed by architect Horace G. Wadlin and built in 1878 for Robert Kemp, leader of the popular Old Folks Concerts. The house was the second in Reading that Kemp had built; the first also is still standing.

Originally built in the Second Empire style with a mansard roof, the house was extensively altered in the 1890s, when its mansard roof was removed and Tudor Revival styling was added.

The house was listed on the National Register of Historic Places in 1984.

== See also ==
- National Register of Historic Places listings in Reading, Massachusetts
- National Register of Historic Places listings in Middlesex County, Massachusetts
