= Horace G. Wadlin =

American statistician, economist, librarian and architect

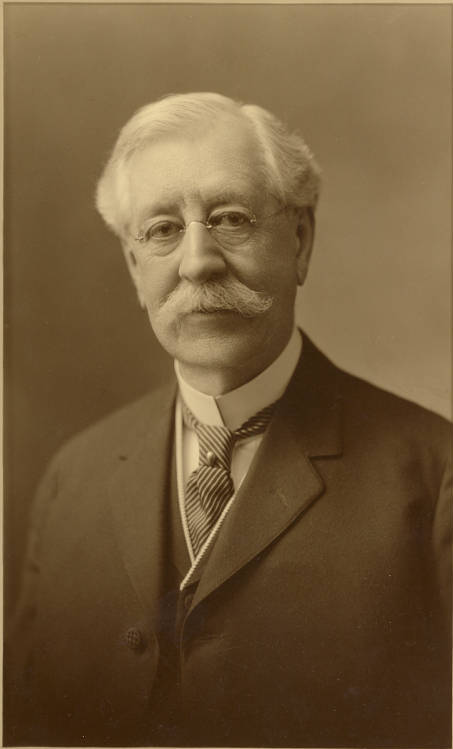

Horace G. Wadlin (October 2, 1851 – November 5, 1925), of Reading, Massachusetts, was an American statistician, economist, librarian, and architect.

== Biography ==
He was born in 1851 in Wakefield, Massachusetts. He studied architecture in Salem and in Boston, and in 1875-79 was engaged in the practice of architecture in Boston. He was appointed special agent for the Massachusetts Bureau of Statistics of Labor in 1879 and upon becoming its chief in 1888 abandoned his professional practice. He was a member of the Massachusetts legislature in 1884–88, was supervisor of the United States census in 1890 and in 1900 and also of the Massachusetts census of 1895. He was also the chief supervisor of the 1890 and 1900 censuses for Massachusetts.

He served as the chief of the Bureau of Statistics until 1906. In 1906, he retired from the Bureau of Statistics to become the librarian of the Boston Public Library. He announced his resignation as the librarian of the Boston Public Library in December 1916.

Wadlin was a member of the American Economic Association, the American Social Science Association, and the American Statistical Association, serving as vice president of the latter organization.

Wadlin died in November 1925 after an operation for kidney trouble.

== Architectural works ==
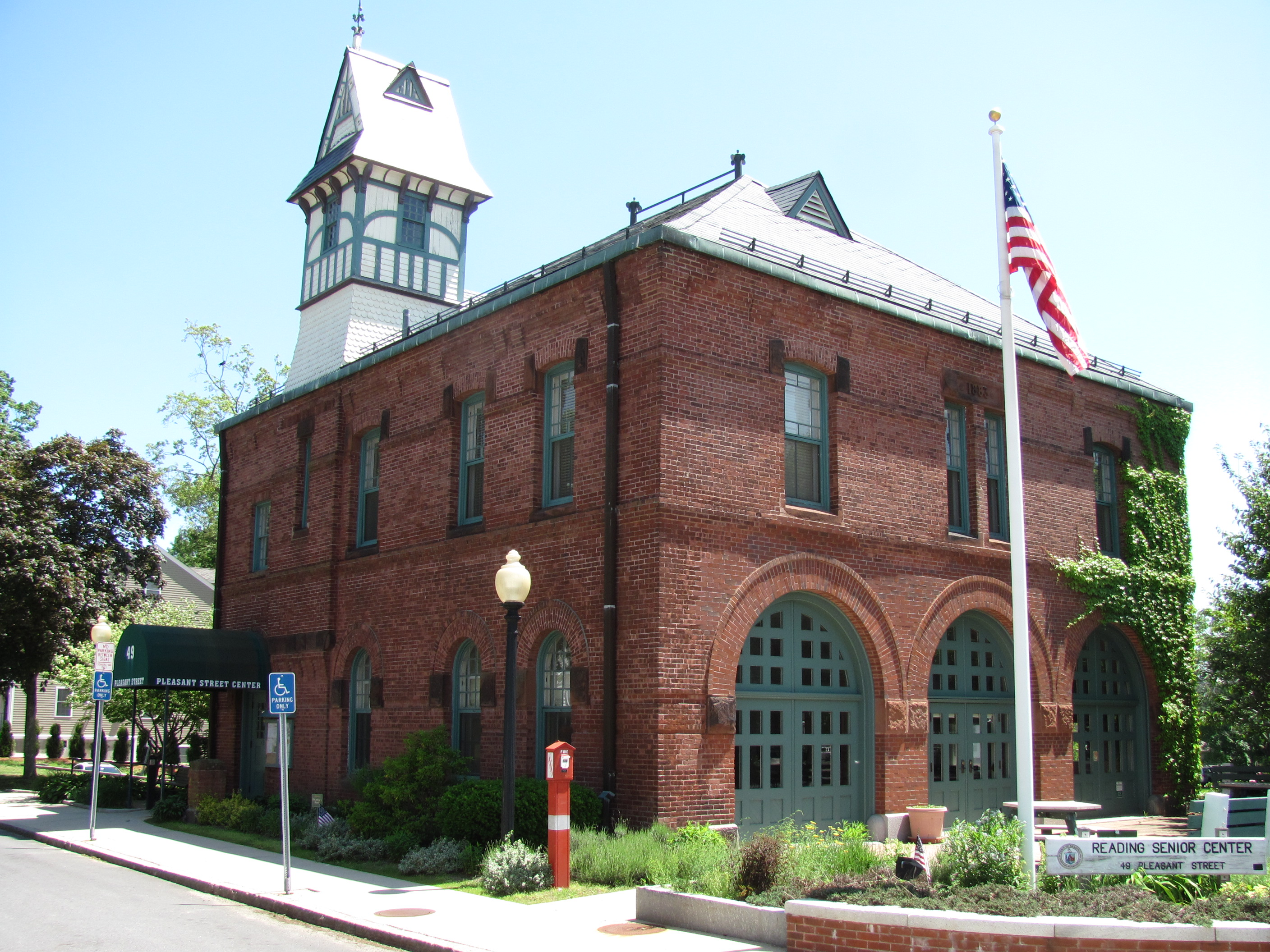
Reading Municipal Building

Several of his architectural works are listed on the U.S. National Register of Historic Places. Architectural works include:

- Bowser Gazebo, 25 Linden St. Reading, MA, NRHP-listed
- Highland School, 64 Middlesex Ave. Reading, MA, NRHP-listed
- House at 199 Summer Avenue, 199 Summer Ave. Reading, MA, NRHP-listed
- House at 57 Woburn Street, 57 Woburn St. Reading, MA, NRHP-listed
- Reading Municipal Building, 49 Pleasant St. Reading, MA, NRHP-listed
- Walnut Street School, 55 Hopkins St. Reading, MA, NRHP-listed
- Old Dyer Library Building, Saco, Maine

His home at 206 Woburn Street is "one of the clearest examples of Shingle style" in the city. That house is included in the NRHP-listed Woburn Street Historic District.

== Literary works ==
- Reports on Statistics of Labor of Massachusetts (14 vols., 1888–1901)
- Annual Statistics of Manufactures of Massachusetts (16 vols., 1888–1901)
- Decennial Census of Massachusetts (7 vols, 1895)
- The Public Library of the City of Boston: A History (1911)
