= Bowser Gazebo =

- U.S. National Register of Historic Places
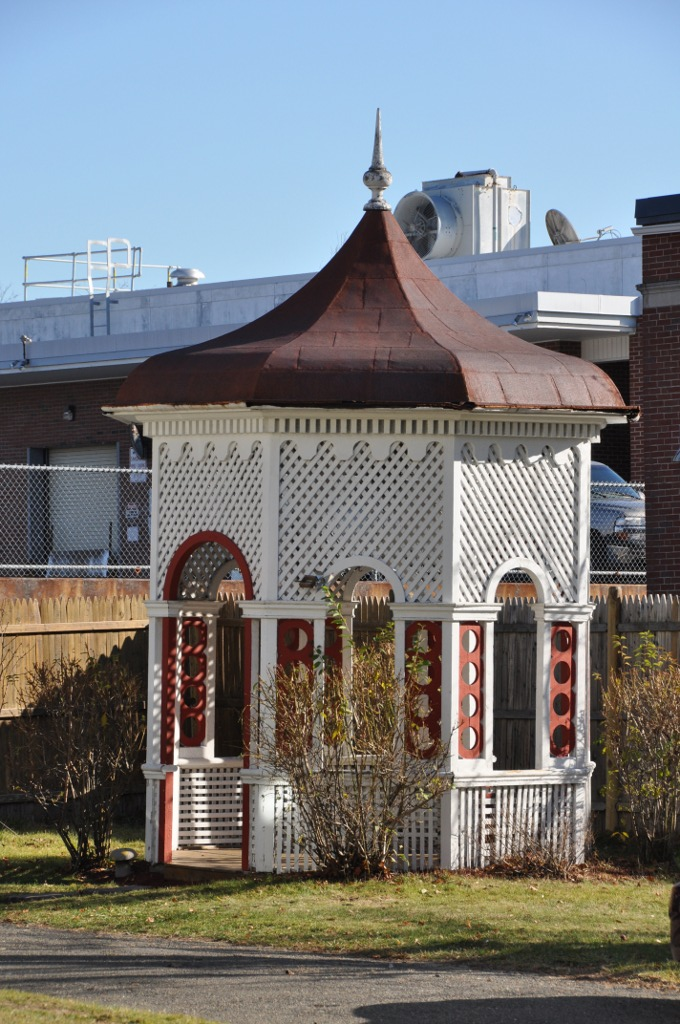

- Location within Massachusetts Location within the United States
- Location: Reading, Massachusetts
- Coordinates: 42°31′27.84″N 71°6′20.24″W
- Built: 1894
- Architect: Wadlin, Horace G.
- MPS: Reading MRA
- NRHP reference No.: 84002514
- Added to NRHP: July 19, 1984

The Bowser Gazebo is a historic gazebo at 25 Linden Street in Reading, Massachusetts. It is an open octagonal wooden structure, measuring about 10 by 10 feet (3.0 m × 3.0 m). It has a low cross-hatched balustrade, above which piers rise to support the octagonal bell-cast roof. The piers are paneled, with circular holes in the paneling. Above the piers is a large area of diagonal cross-hatching, with small rounded arches at the non-entry openings and larger round-arch openings at the entrances.

The gazebo was designed by architect Horace G. Wadlin and built sometime before 1894. It is one of the only known surviving 19th century gazebos in Reading. It (and the house on the property) belonged to R. L. Bowser, owner of a local dry goods store.

The gazebo was listed on the U.S. National Register of Historic Places in 1984.

== See also ==
- National Register of Historic Places listings in Reading, Massachusetts
- National Register of Historic Places listings in Middlesex County, Massachusetts
