= Reading Municipal Building =

- U.S. National Register of Historic Places
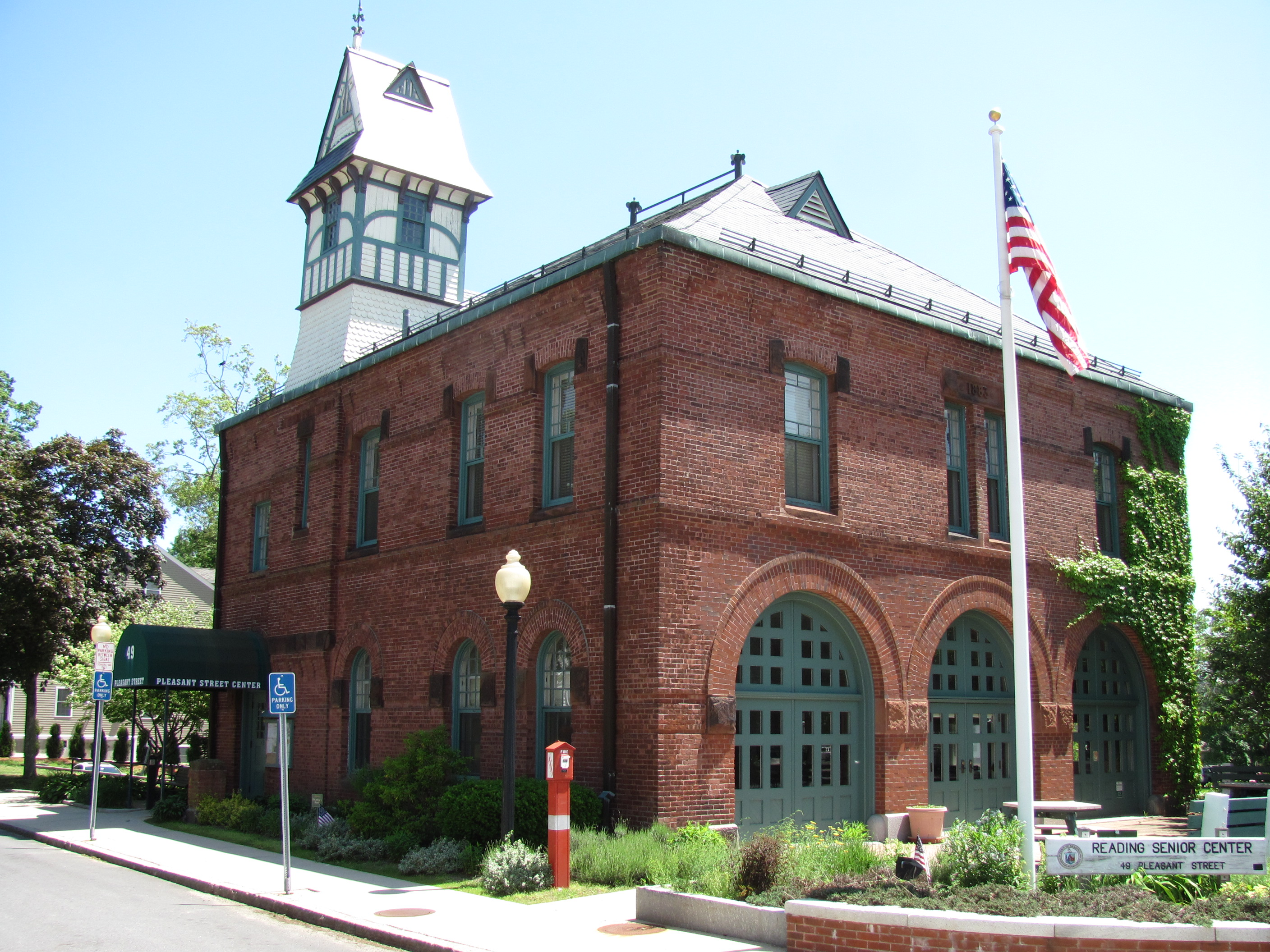
- Reading Municipal Building

- Location within Massachusetts Location within the United States
- Location: 49 Pleasant St., Reading, Massachusetts
- Coordinates: 42°31′26″N 71°6′7″W
- Built: 1883
- Architect: Wadlin, Horace G.
- Architectural style: Renaissance, Stick/Eastlake
- MPS: Reading MRA
- NRHP reference No.: 84002810
- Added to NRHP: July 19, 1984

The former Reading Municipal Building is a historic building at 49 Pleasant Street in Reading, Massachusetts. Built in 1885, this two-story brick building was the town's first municipal structure, housing the town offices, jail, and fire station. In 1918 all functions except fire services moved out of the building. It now serves as Reading's Pleasant Street Senior Center. The building was listed on the National Register of Historic Places in 1984.

== Description and history ==
The former Reading Municipal Building is set on the southeast corner of Pleasant and Parker Streets, just off Reading's Main Street central business district. It is a rectangular two-story brick Renaissance Revival structure with a hip roof. Its northern facade is four bays wide, with the main entrance in the leftmost bay. The three first-floor windows are set in round-arch openings, while the four on the second are set in segmented-arch openings. The west facade originally housed the openings for the fire house, with three large round-arch openings now filled with wood paneling and windows below, and single segmented-arch windows flanking a central pair of narrow windows in the center bay. At the northeast corner, a wood-frame tower with Stick style decoration rises to a gable-over-hip roof.

The town of Reading was incorporated in 1644, but this, its first purpose-built municipal building, was not constructed until 1883. It was designed by local architect Horace G. Wadlin, and housed town offices, fire station, and the local jail. It served all of these roles until 1918, when the town offices were relocated to the present town hall in 1918. This building remained a fire station for many years, with its original round doorway openings combined into two rectangular openings to provide access for more modern fire equipment. The building was in this configuration when it was listed on the National Register of Historic Places in 1984. The fire house facade has since been restored to its original form, albeit with the openings closed off, and the building now houses a local senior center.

== See also ==
- National Register of Historic Places listings in Reading, Massachusetts
- National Register of Historic Places listings in Middlesex County, Massachusetts
