= Reading Public Library (Massachusetts) =

- Highland School
- U.S. National Register of Historic Places
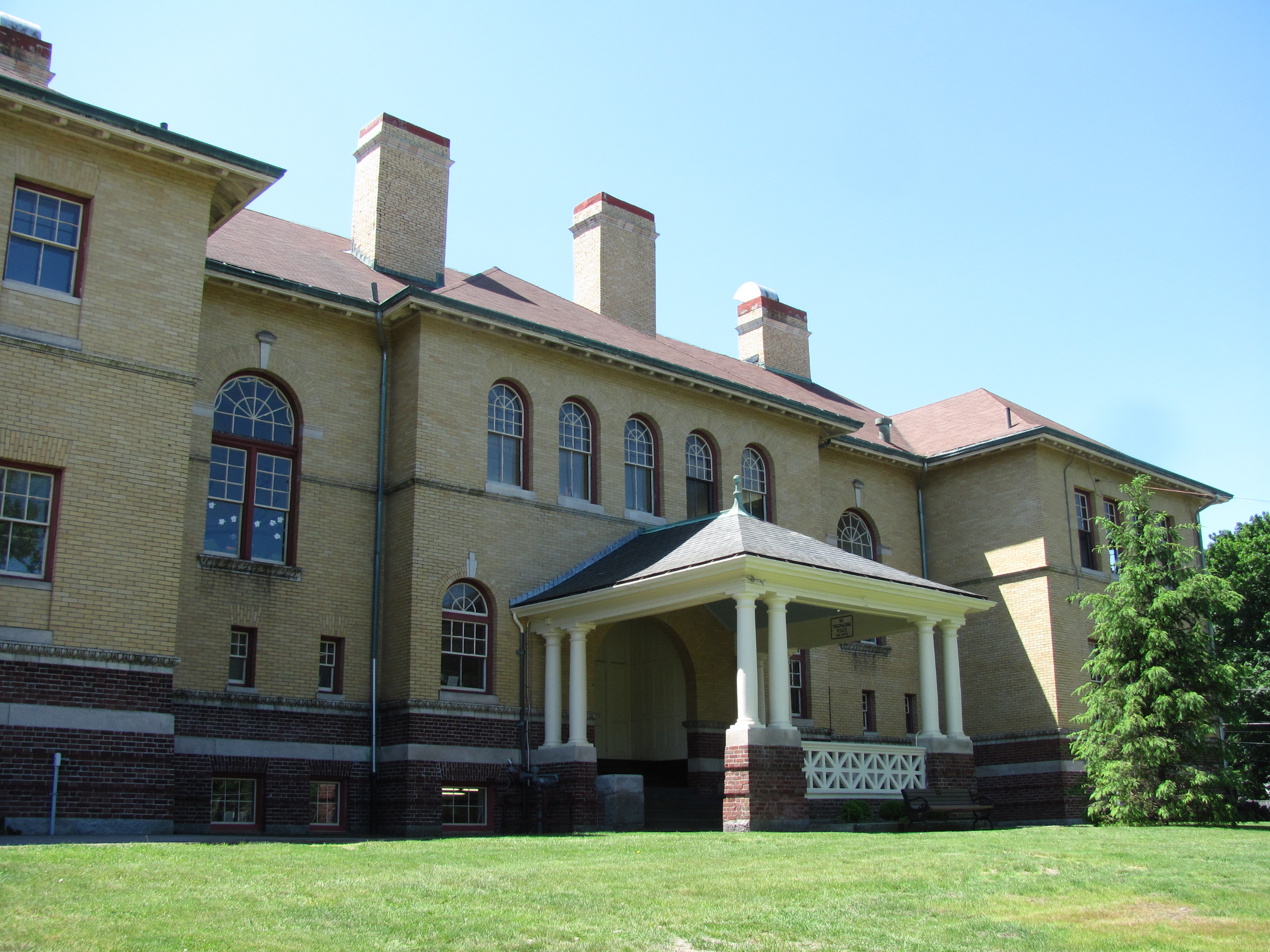
- Highland School

- Location within Massachusetts Location within the United States
- Location: 64 Middlesex Avenue, Reading, Massachusetts
- Coordinates: 42°31′33″N 71°6′39″W
- Area: 1 acre (0.40 ha)
- Built: 1896
- Architect: Horace G. Wadlin
- Architectural style: Late 19th and 20th Century Revivals
- Website: Reading Public Library
- MPS: Reading MRA
- NRHP reference No.: 84002643
- Added to NRHP: July 19, 1984

The Reading Public Library is located in Reading, Massachusetts. Previously known as the Highland School, the two-story brick-and-concrete Renaissance Revival building was designed by architect Horace G. Wadlin and built in 1896–97. The building served the town's public school needs until 1981. It is the town's most architecturally distinguished school building. It was listed on the National Register of Historic Places in 1984, the year it was converted for use as the library.

== Description and history ==
The Highland School building is set on the south side of Middlesex Avenue in the Reading Highlands area of Reading, west of the town's central business district. It is a two-story brick building with concrete and granite trim elements, a hip roof, and a high brick foundation separated from the body by a band of egg-and-dart molding. The body of the building is in pale yellow brick, while the foundation bricks are a darker reddish color. The front facade has projecting sections at each corner, and a center section that projects a shorter distance, but is fronted by a hip-roofed porte-cochere, supported by paired Ionic columns set brick piers connected by a wooden balustrade. The porte-cochere shelters the main entrance, which is recessed under a round-arch opening and accessed by stairs. The second level of the center projection has a bank of five round-arch windows.

The Reading Highlands area was platted for residential development in the 1870s, and this school was built in 1896-97 to provide educational facilities to that area. The building was designed by the prominent local architect Horace G. Wadlin. The school was at first used for grades 4-8, and the junior high school occupied the first floor between 1915 and 1927. The school was closed in 1981, and in 1984 it was converted for use as the town's public library. An expansion and rehabilitation was completed in 2016.

== See also ==
- National Register of Historic Places listings in Reading, Massachusetts
- National Register of Historic Places listings in Middlesex County, Massachusetts
