= Museum of Early Trades and Crafts =

- Madison Public Library and the James Building
- U.S. National Register of Historic Places
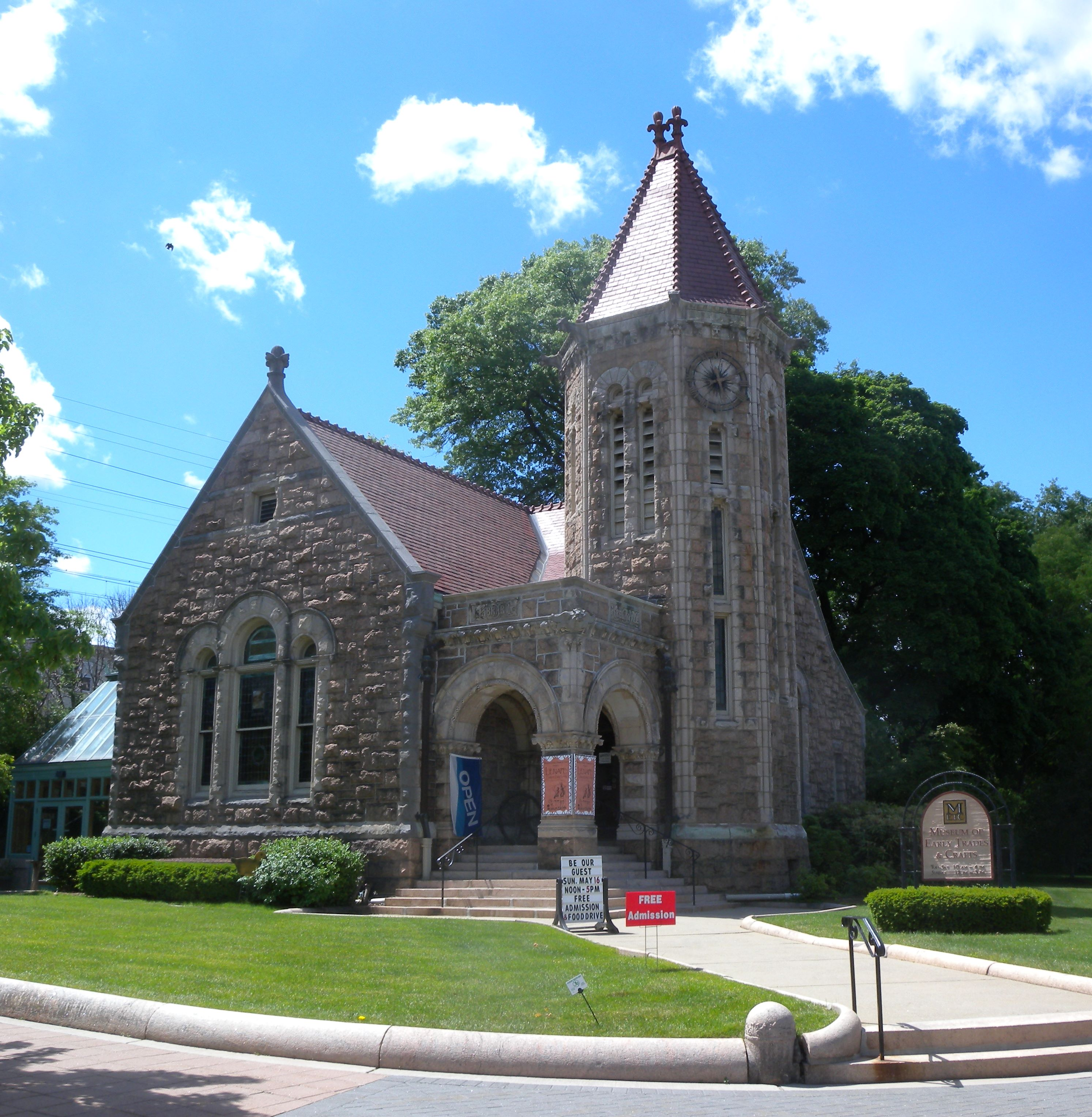

- Location within Morris County, New Jersey Location within New Jersey Location within the United States
- Location: Main St. and Green Village Rd., Madison, New Jersey
- Coordinates: 40.75960°N 74.41690°W
- Built: 1900
- Architects: Charles Brigham, Willard P. Adden
- Architectural style: Romanesque, Richardsonian Romanesque
- NRHP reference No.: 80002512
- Added to NRHP: February 8, 1980

The Museum of Early Trades & Crafts is a non-profit educational institution in Madison, Morris County, New Jersey, United States. The museum's mission is:

To inspire a connection with New Jersey's history, culture, trades, and crafts.

The museum's historic structure, the Madison Public Library and the James Building, is listed on the National Register of Historic Places (as Reference #: 80002512).

== History ==
The museum was founded in 1969 in the former site of the Madison Public Library to house a collection of over 8,000 tools and artifacts used in New Jersey before 1860 that had been collected by Agnes and Edgar Land. The couple started their collection on Long Island in the 1940s, purchasing 18th and 19th century craft items that had been used on area farms that had started to become mechanized or converted to residential developments. The couple continued their collecting after moving to New Jersey.

The museum's building, designed by Boston architect Charles Brigham and his associate, Willard P. Adden, is a prime example of Romanesque Revival; the building, a gift to the town of D. Willis James, was completed in 1900, and was used as the town's library until the late 1960s when it was leased by the Lands as a site for the museum.

The museum underwent an extensive renovation project in the 1990s, funded by a million-dollar fundraising effort, to bring the facility up to date in its century-old structure. As part of the renovation project, the museum received a $240,000 grant from the New Jersey Historic Trust towards interior restoration that would allow the public to appreciate the building's "most dramatic architectural features--groined vaulting, decorative stained glass and stenciling, fireplaces, handsome light fixtures and intricate woodwork" which had been hidden by architectural changes made over the intervening years since its construction a century earlier.

== Exhibits and programs ==
Artifacts on exhibit at the museum include such items as buckets, powder horns, hayforks, cradle scythes, and the ice saws used to cut and collect ice from the surface ponds in the pre-refrigeration era of iceboxes.

The museum's most popular programs involve craftspeople — such as carpenters, coopers and blacksmiths — demonstrating the use of these tools in the performance of their professions.
