= Eaton–Prescott House =

Historic house in Massachusetts, United States

- U.S. National Register of Historic Places
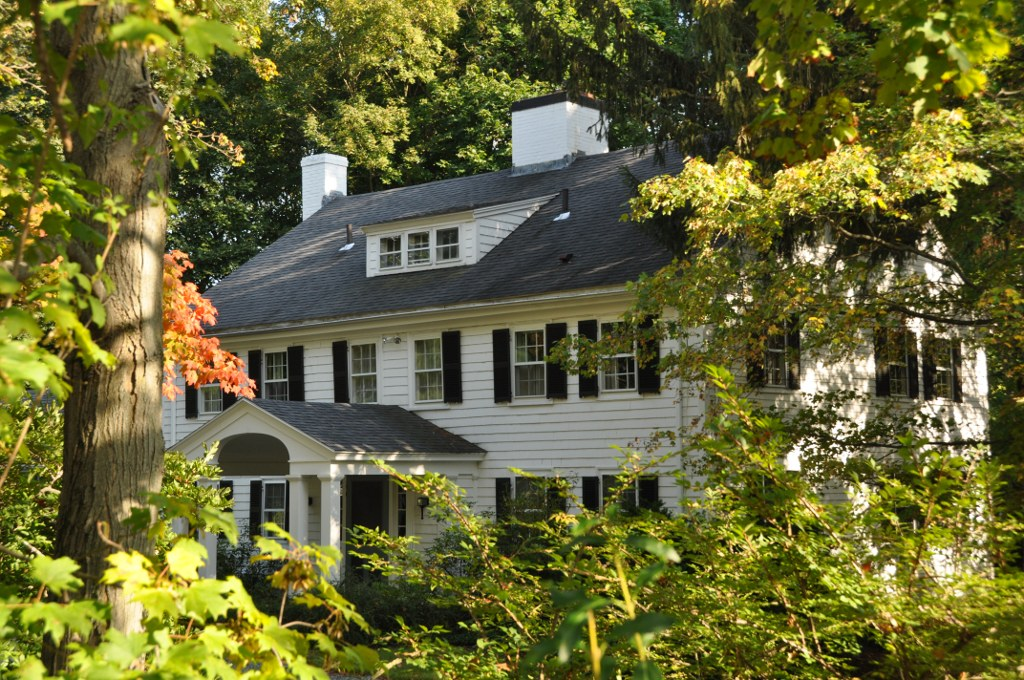

- Location within Massachusetts Location within the United States
- Location: Reading, Massachusetts
- Coordinates: 42°31′3″N 71°6′52″W
- Built: circa 1757; circa 1907
- Architect: Willard P. Adden (circa 1907)
- Architectural style: Greek Revival, Georgian
- MPS: Reading MRA
- NRHP reference No.: 84002597
- Added to NRHP: July 19, 1984

The Eaton–Prescott House is a historic house at 284 Summer Avenue in Reading, Massachusetts, United States. Its oldest portion was probably built before 1757. By that year it had acquired a leanto section, since removed or incorporated into the main structure of the house. It is now a principally Georgian style house, although its door surround dates to the Greek Revival period of the 1830s-1840s. The house stands on land that was in the Eaton family as far back as the late 17th century.

The house remained in the same family until the last local descendant of the Prescotts died in 1902. The house was purchased c. 1907 by local architect Willard P. Adden, who restored and renovated it for use as his family home. He moved out of the house c. 1916.

The house was listed on the National Register of Historic Places in 1984.

== See also ==
- National Register of Historic Places listings in Reading, Massachusetts
- National Register of Historic Places listings in Middlesex County, Massachusetts
