= Everett Avenue–Sheffield Road Historic District =

Historic district in Massachusetts, United States

- U.S. National Register of Historic Places
- U.S. Historic district
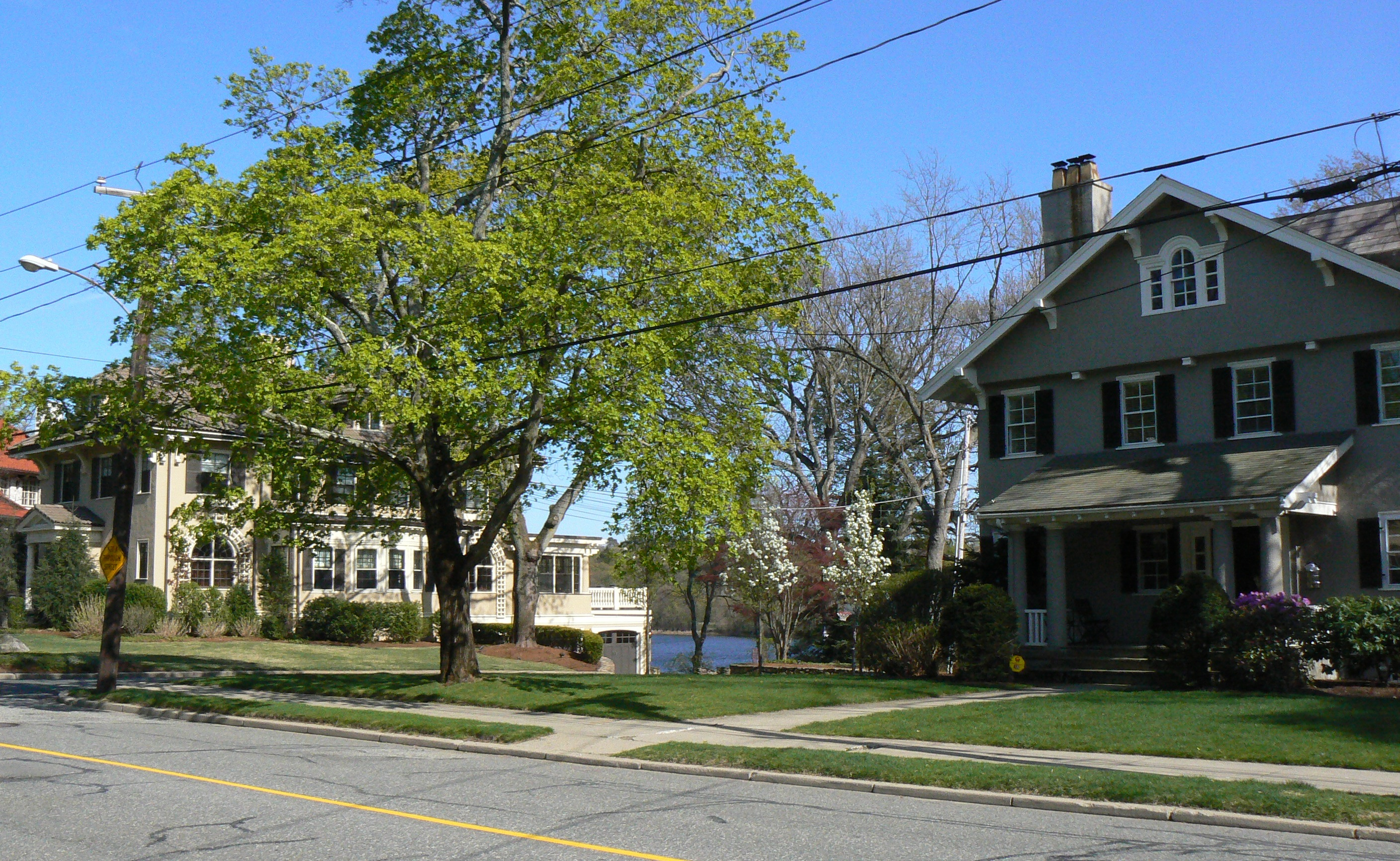
- Everett Avenue and Niles Lane

- Location within Massachusetts Location within the United States
- Location: Winchester, Massachusetts
- Coordinates: 42°26′43″N 71°8′49″W
- Area: 49.38 acres (19.98 ha)
- Architect: F. Patterson Smith, Dexter Blaikie
- Architectural style: Colonial Revival, Bungalow/Craftsman
- MPS: Winchester MRA
- NRHP reference No.: 89000661
- Added to NRHP: July 5, 1989

The Everett Avenue–Sheffield Road Historic District is a historic district encompassing one of the finest residential districts from the turn of the 20th century in Winchester, Massachusetts. The district is roughly triangular in shape, bounded in the north by Bacon Street, on the west by Church Street, Sheffield West, and Sheffield Road, and on the south and heast by the Upper Mystic Lake and Mystic Valley Parkway. It is characterized by winding roads, with relatively large houses on well-proportioned lots. Most of the houses were built between 1890 and 1916, and all exhibit some architectural sophistication. A significant number of properties were designed by either F. Patterson Smith or Dexter Blaikie, two local architects. The district was listed on the National Register of Historic Places in 1989.

This residential area was not formally laid out as a subdivision. It was in this area that Massachusetts politician and orator Edward Everett had an estate in the 1850s; it is for him that Everett Avenue is named. The earliest house is at 8 Everett Avenue, built in 1880, in the Colonial Revival style, which predominated in construction until the advent of the 20th century. One of the finest examples of this style is the Smith-designed Chadwick House at 24 Everett Avenue, combining stucco walls with brick trim on the corners and window trim.

Houses built in the 20th century tended by be either Neo-Rationalist, Tudor Revival, or Craftsman in their styling. Many houses in this time were designed either by Dexter Blaikie, Phineas Nickerson, or both in partnership. A house Blaikie designed for himself, at 45 Everett Avenue, is a relatively simple example of Tudor Revival styling. A more elaborate example of that style, designed by Blaikie and Nickerson is the Martin House at 23 Sheffield Road. The district includes a total of 129 properties, of which only 20 do not contribute to its significance. These are mostly excluded because they do not meet the normal 50-year cutoff period for historical significance, although a few buildings have been compromised by unsympathetic alterations.

== See also ==
- National Register of Historic Places listings in Winchester, Massachusetts
