= Walnut Street School (Evansville, Indiana) =

- Formerly listed on the U.S. National Register of Historic Places
- Location: Walnut and 9th Sts., Evansville, Indiana
- Area: less than one acre
- Built: 1913
- Architect: Shopbell & Company
- Architectural style: Prairie School
- MPS: Downtown Evansville MRA
- NRHP reference No.: 82000127

Significant dates
- Added to NRHP: July 1, 1982
- Removed from NRHP: November 13, 1987

Walnut Street School was a historic school building located in downtown Evansville, Indiana. It was designed by the architecture firm Shopbell & Company and built in 1913. It was in the Prairie School style architecture. It has been demolished.

It was listed on the National Register of Historic Places in 1982 and delisted in 1987.
