= Walnut Street School (Reading, Massachusetts) =

- U.S. National Register of Historic Places
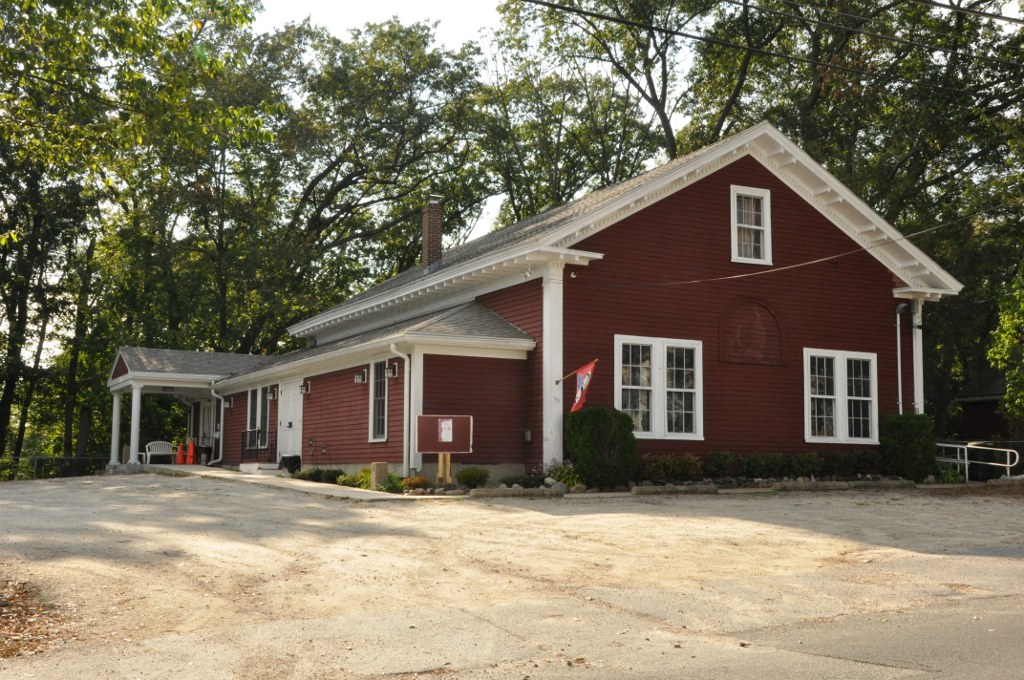

- Location within Massachusetts Location within the United States
- Location: Reading, Massachusetts
- Coordinates: 42°30′31″N 71°6′25″W
- Built: 1854
- Architect: Wadlin, Horace G.
- Architectural style: Italianate
- MPS: Reading MRA
- NRHP reference No.: 84002841
- Added to NRHP: July 19, 1984

The Walnut Street School is a historic school building at 55 Hopkins Street in Reading, Massachusetts. A two-room schoolhouse built in 1854, it is the town's oldest public building. Since 1962 it has been home to the Quannapowitt Players, a local theatrical company. The building was listed on the National Register of Historic Places in 1984.

== Description and history ==
The Walnut Street School is set on the west side of Hopkins Street in a residential area of southern Reading. It is a roughly rectangular single-story wood-frame structure, with its long axis perpendicular to the street. The building is finished in wooden clapboards, and has a gable roof whose eaves are studded with Italianate brackets. The building corners are pilastered. The street-facing facade is two bays wide, with each bay containing a pair of sash windows; there is a single sash window in the gable end. Most of the south facade is covered by a modern extended vestibule with a hip roof, and a projecting gable-roofed portico supported by round columns near the western end. One entrance is under the portico, while another is roughly centered on the extended vestibule.

The building was originally located at the intersection of Summer Avenue and Walnut Street in Reading, and housed two class-rooms when it was built in 1854. It is the oldest surviving civic building in the town. In 1883 the building was moved to its current location on Hopkins Street and renamed to the Chestnut Hill School. In 1884 the building's entrance was redesigned and its interior reconfigured, to plans by local architect Horace G. Wadlin. It was used as a school until 1944. In 1962 it was sold to the Quannapowitt Players, a local theatrical organization, which has further modified the entry and adapted the interior as a 150-seat theater.

== See also ==
- National Register of Historic Places listings in Reading, Massachusetts
- National Register of Historic Places listings in Middlesex County, Massachusetts
