= Woburn Street Historic District =

Historic district in Massachusetts, United States

- U.S. National Register of Historic Places
- U.S. Historic district
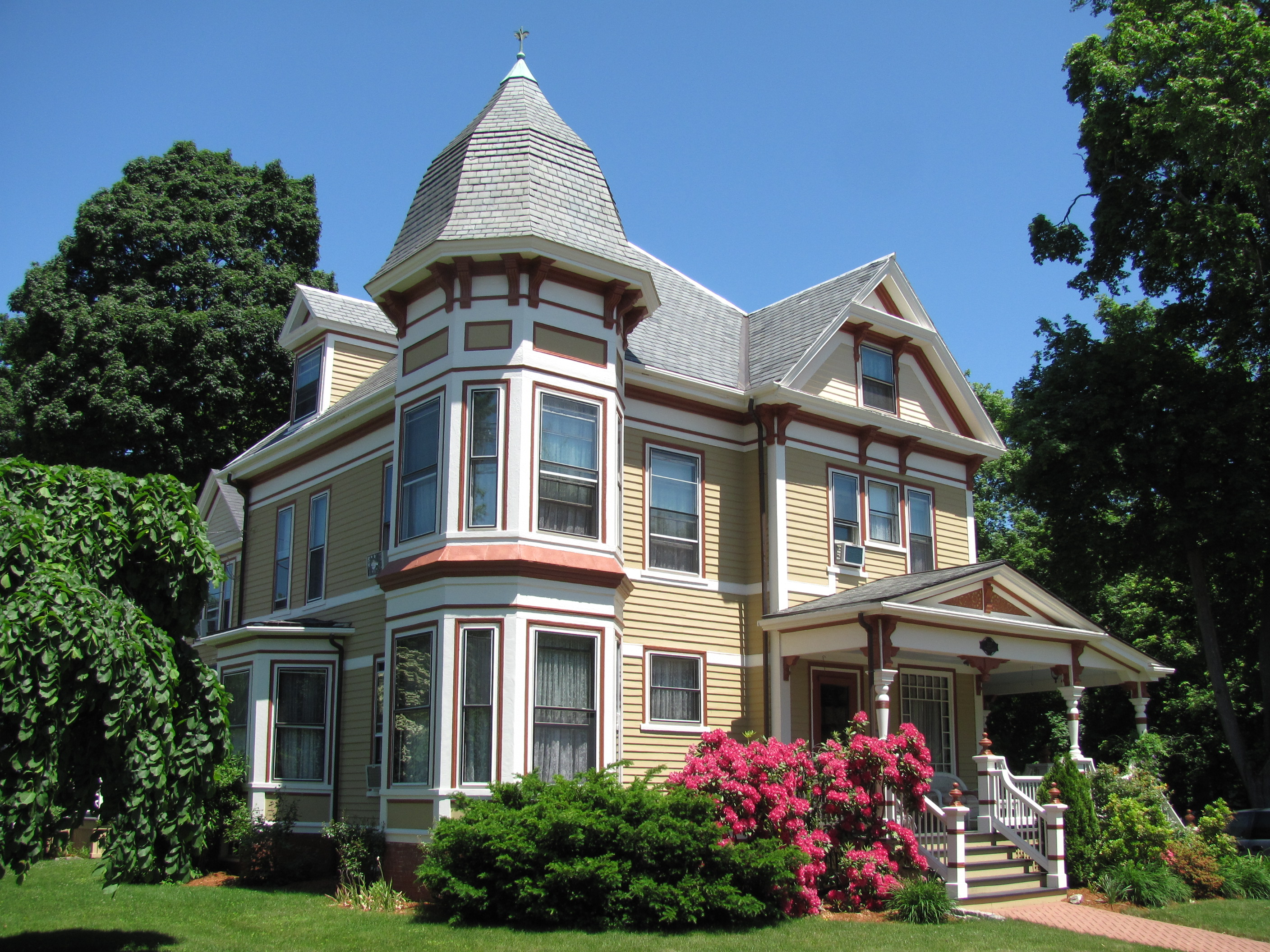
- Corner of Woburn Street and Summer Avenue

- Location within Massachusetts Location within the United States
- Location: Reading, Massachusetts
- Coordinates: 42°31′14″N 71°6′53″W
- Built: 1795
- Architect: Willard P. Adden; Horace G. Wadlin et al.
- Architectural style: Mid 19th Century Revival, Late 19th and 20th Century Revivals, Late Victorian
- MPS: Reading MRA
- NRHP reference No.: 85000551
- Added to NRHP: February 1, 1985

The Woburn Street Historic District of Reading, Massachusetts encompasses a two-block section of late 19th century upper-class housing. The 10-acre (4.0 ha) extends along Woburn Street from Summer Street to Temple Street, and includes sixteen houses on well-proportioned lots along an attractive tree-lined section of the street. The historic district was listed on the National Register of Historic Places in 1985.

Woburn Street is one of the oldest streets in Reading, with portions appearing on a map in 1765. The area remained rural until the late 19th century, when railroad-influenced suburban development resulted in the extension and development of the road. Four houses were built prior to this time: the c. 1795 house at 201 Woburn Street, a predominantly Federal-style house that was later modified with a Colonial Revival portico, is the oldest house in the district. Other houses from earlier in the 19th century are two Greek Revival and one Italianate style house, which was moved c. 1908 to the area to serve as the rectory for the Saint Agnes Church.

A number of prominent individuals lived in the district. 206 Woburn Street, a Shingle style building, was the home of architect Horace G. Wadlin. Railroad owner Edward Appleton lived at 201 Woburn Street, as did shoemaker Daniel Pratt and architect Willard P. Adden. The house at 216 Woburn Street was owned by local hardware store owner Richard W. Francis. A founder and director of the First National Bank in Reading lived at 177 Woburn Street.

Most of the houses in the district are either Colonial Revival or Queen Anne in styling; even one of the early Greek Revival houses was refashioned in Queen Anne style. Houses at 183 Woburn Street and 228 Woburn Street are good examples of Colonial Revival style. There is one Craftsman-style house, at 207 Woburn Street.

== See also ==
- National Register of Historic Places listings in Reading, Massachusetts
- National Register of Historic Places listings in Middlesex County, Massachusetts
