= Ace Art Company =

- U.S. National Register of Historic Places
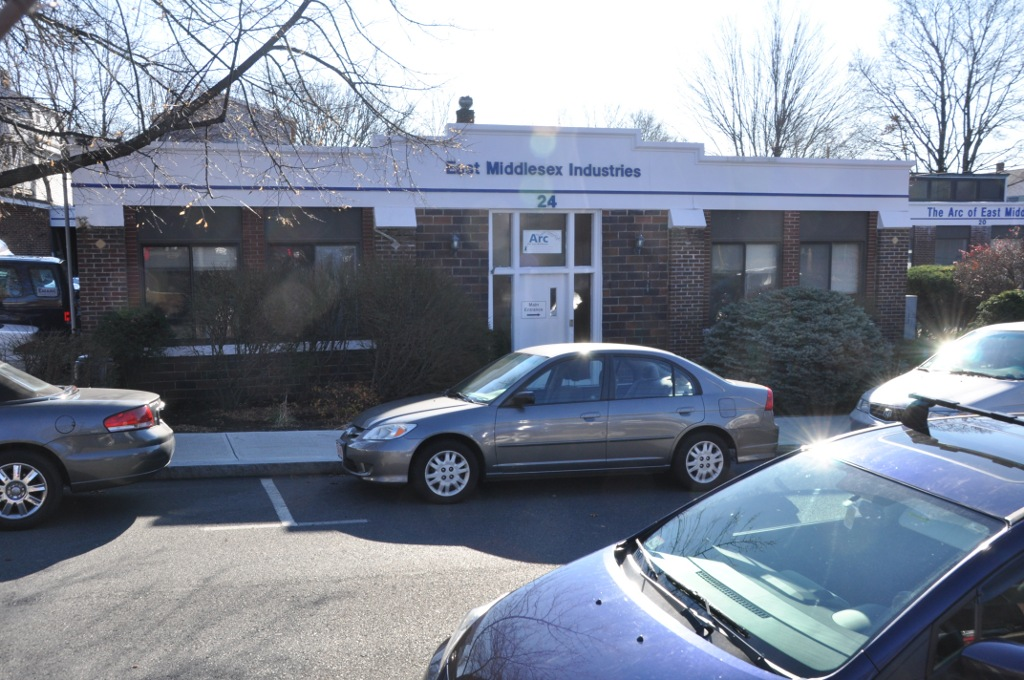

- Location within Massachusetts Location within the United States
- Location: 24 Gould Street, Reading, Massachusetts
- Coordinates: 42°31′20″N 71°6′21″W
- Built: 1924
- Architectural style: Art Deco
- MPS: Reading MRA
- NRHP reference No.: 85000497
- Added to NRHP: February 1, 1985

The Ace Art Company is a historic commercial and industrial building in Reading, Massachusetts. Built in 1924, the single-story brick building is the only Art Deco building in Reading. It was listed on the National Register of Historic Places in 1985.

== Description and history ==
The Ace Art Company building is set on the south side of Gould Street, a relatively short street on the southwest side of Reading's central business district. It is a single-story brick structure with a flat roof, and restrained Art Deco styling. Its main facade is divided into three bays by brick buttresses, which have concrete caps with ceramic tile detailing. A stepped parapet rises above the central bay, where the main entrance is located. The brick surrounding the entrance is larger and of more varied color than that used in the buttresses. The outer bays each have two windows separated by brick piers fashioned of bricks smaller than those of the buttresses, with concrete sill set on several courses of the larger bricks of the central section.

The Ace Art Company manufactured mounting corners for photographs, using patented technology to produce them in large numbers. This building was built for the company in 1924. The building was enlarged to the rear in 1931, 1941, and 1966; the main entrance was redesigned with the last addition.

== See also ==
- National Register of Historic Places listings in Reading, Massachusetts
- National Register of Historic Places listings in Middlesex County, Massachusetts
