= Jackson =

Jackson may refer to:

== People ==
- Jackson (given name), includes a list of people with the name
- Jackson (surname), includes a list of people with the name

== Places ==
=== Australia ===
- Jackson, Queensland, a town in the Maranoa Region
- Jackson North, Queensland, a locality in the Maranoa Region
- Jackson South, Queensland, a locality in the Maranoa Region
- Jackson oil field in Durham, Shire of Bulloo, Queensland

=== Canada ===
- Jackson Inlet, Nunavut
- Jackson Island (Nunavut)
- Jackson, a small community southeast of London, Ontario

=== United States ===
- Jackson, Alabama
- Jackson, California
- Jackson, Georgia
- Jackson, Idaho
- Jackson, Indiana, an unincorporated community in Tipton County
- Jackson, Kentucky
- Jackson, Louisiana
- Jackson, Maine
- Jackson, Michigan
- Jackson, Minnesota
- Jackson, Mississippi, the state capital of and most populous city in Mississippi
- Jackson, Missouri
- Jackson, Montana
- Jackson, Nebraska
- Jackson, New Hampshire, a town in Carroll County
- Jackson, Camden County, New Jersey
- Jackson, New York
- Jackson, North Carolina, a town in Northampton County
- Jackson, Union County, North Carolina
- Jackson, Ohio
- Jackson, Pennsylvania
- Jackson, Rhode Island
- Jackson, South Carolina
- Jackson, Tennessee, the ninth-most populous city in Tennessee
- Jackson, Washington
- Jackson, Wisconsin (disambiguation), multiple places with the same name
- Jackson, Wyoming
- Jackson County (disambiguation)
- Jackson metropolitan area (disambiguation)
- Jackson River (Virginia)
- Jackson Township (disambiguation)
- Lake Jackson, Texas

=== Elsewhere ===
- Jackson River (New Zealand)
- Jackson Island, Franz Josef Land, Russian Federation
- Jackson (crater), on the Moon

== Arts and entertainment ==
- Jackson (2008 film), an American comedy-drama-musical film
- Jackson (2015 film), an Indian Kannada romantic comedy
- Jackson, a 1991 album by Tar
- "Jackson" (song), a 1963 song recorded by Johnny Cash and others
- Classical Electrodynamics (book), a textbook often known by the name of its author: Jackson

== Businesses ==
- Jackson Guitars, a manufacturing company
- Jackson Laboratory, a biomedical research institution
- Jackson National Life, a financial services company

== Computing ==
- Jackson (API), a JSON processor for Java
- Jackson structured programming

== Other uses ==
- M36 tank destroyer, nicknamed the "Jackson", a U.S. tank destroyer in World War II
- Jackson Correctional Institution (Florida), U.S.
- Jackson Correctional Institution (Wisconsin), U.S.

== See also ==
- Jackson's (disambiguation)
- Jacksonville (disambiguation)
- Jackson Hole (disambiguation)
- Jackson Lake (disambiguation)
- Jackson station (disambiguation)
- Jaxon (disambiguation)
- Mount Jackson (disambiguation)
- Jaxson
- United States twenty-dollar bill, nicknamed for Andrew Jackson, whose picture appears on the obverse side
