= Kitty Harrison (tennis) =

American tennis coach (1934–2026)

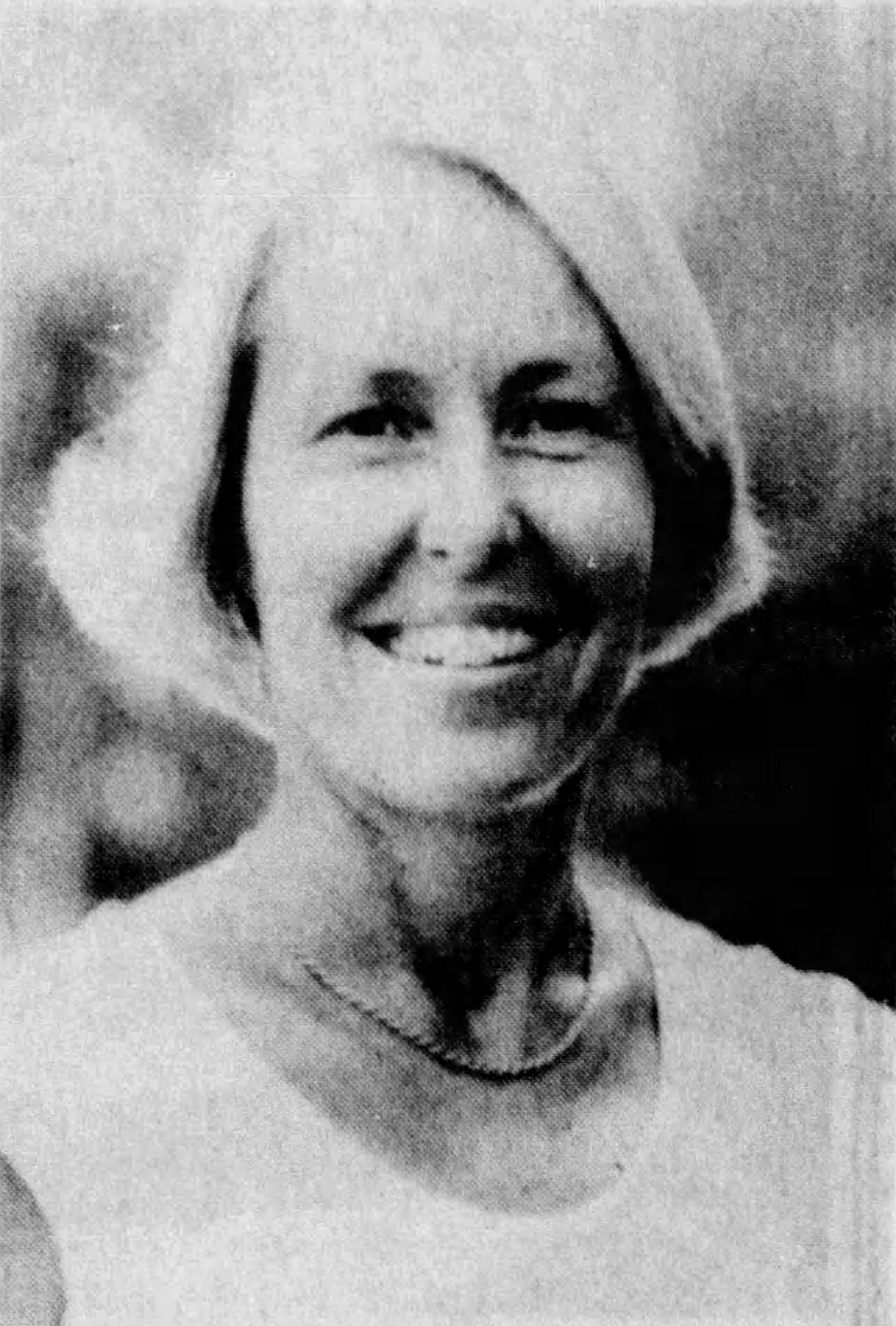
- Harrison c. 1980
- Full name: Katherine Gordon Harrison
- Residence: Chapel Hill, North Carolina, U.S.
- Born: November 14, 1934 Austin, Texas, U.S.
- Died: March 27, 2026 (aged 91)
- College: Texas (BA, MA)

Coaching career
- North Carolina (1976–1998)

Katherine Gordon Harrison (14 November 1934 – March 27, 2026) was an American college tennis coach who was the head coach of the North Carolina Tar Heels women's tennis team from 1976 to 1998. At the time of her retirement, she was the most successful women's tennis coach within the Atlantic Coast Conference.

== Early life and education ==
Harrison grew up in Austin, Texas. Her father, Thomas P. Harrison, went to college at the University of North Carolina. She took up tennis at age seven or eight and received instruction from University of Texas classics professor and longtime men's tennis coach D. A. Penick. She played high school tennis for Austin High School and competed in local and state junior tournaments. After a year of attending Sweet Briar College in Virginia, she transferred to the University of Texas, where she joined groups such as Kappa Kappa Gamma, the Mortar Board, the Orange Jackets, and Phi Beta Kappa. There was no intercollegiate women's tennis program at Texas at the time, so she played on a club team. She majored in history and philosophy, graduating with honors in 1956.

After college, Harrison worked as a secretary in cities across the country. She eventually returned to the University of Texas to earn a master's degree in classics. In 1970, she enrolled in a classics PhD program at the University of North Carolina, but she left in the summer of 1974 after seeing how few teaching positions were open in the field. She became certified as a tennis instructor after training at Dennis Van der Meer's tennis academy in Hilton Head, South Carolina, and began working as an assistant instructor at the Hollow Rock Racquet & Swim Club in Durham, North Carolina.

== Coaching career ==
Harrison began coaching the women's tennis program at the University of North Carolina in 1976–77, succeeding longtime coach Frances Hogan. This was initially a part-time job, and she continued to work at the tennis club in Durham, until she was hired full time for the 1979–80 season. Under Harrison, North Carolina won the first four ACC Championships, from 1977 to 1980, and finished runner-up four other times. Eight times, they finished the season ranked within the top 25 nationally, and she had only four losing seasons. Notable players for Harrison include Kathy Barton; Cinda Gurney, the 1993 NCAA Women's Singles Championships runner-up; and Alisha Portnoy. She retired after the 1997–98 season, succeeded by Kansas coach Roland Thornqvist. Sportswriter Mary Garber described her as "quiet and soft-spoken, but with a passion for tennis".

== Death and legacy ==
At the time of her retirement in 1998, Harrison was the winningest women's tennis coach in ACC history by dual match wins (with a record of about 360 wins, 225 losses). (Note: Contemporary sources say 362 wins, 226 losses, while later sources say 351 wins, 224 losses.) This record was eventually broken by fellow North Carolina coach Brian Kalbas in 2017. She was inducted into the North Carolina Tennis Hall of Fame in 2004.

The Kitty Harrison Invitational is an annual preseason women's college tournament held at the University of North Carolina since 2004. Also named after Harrison is the North Carolina women's tennis team's most valuable player award.

Harrison died on March 27, 2026.
