= Jacksonville micropolitan area =

The Jacksonville micropolitan area may refer to:

- Jacksonville, Illinois, micropolitan area
- Cherokee County, Texas, comprises the Jacksonville, Texas, micropolitan area

== See also ==
- Jacksonville metropolitan area (disambiguation)
- Jacksonville (disambiguation)
