= Brian Kalbas =

American tennis coach (born 1966)

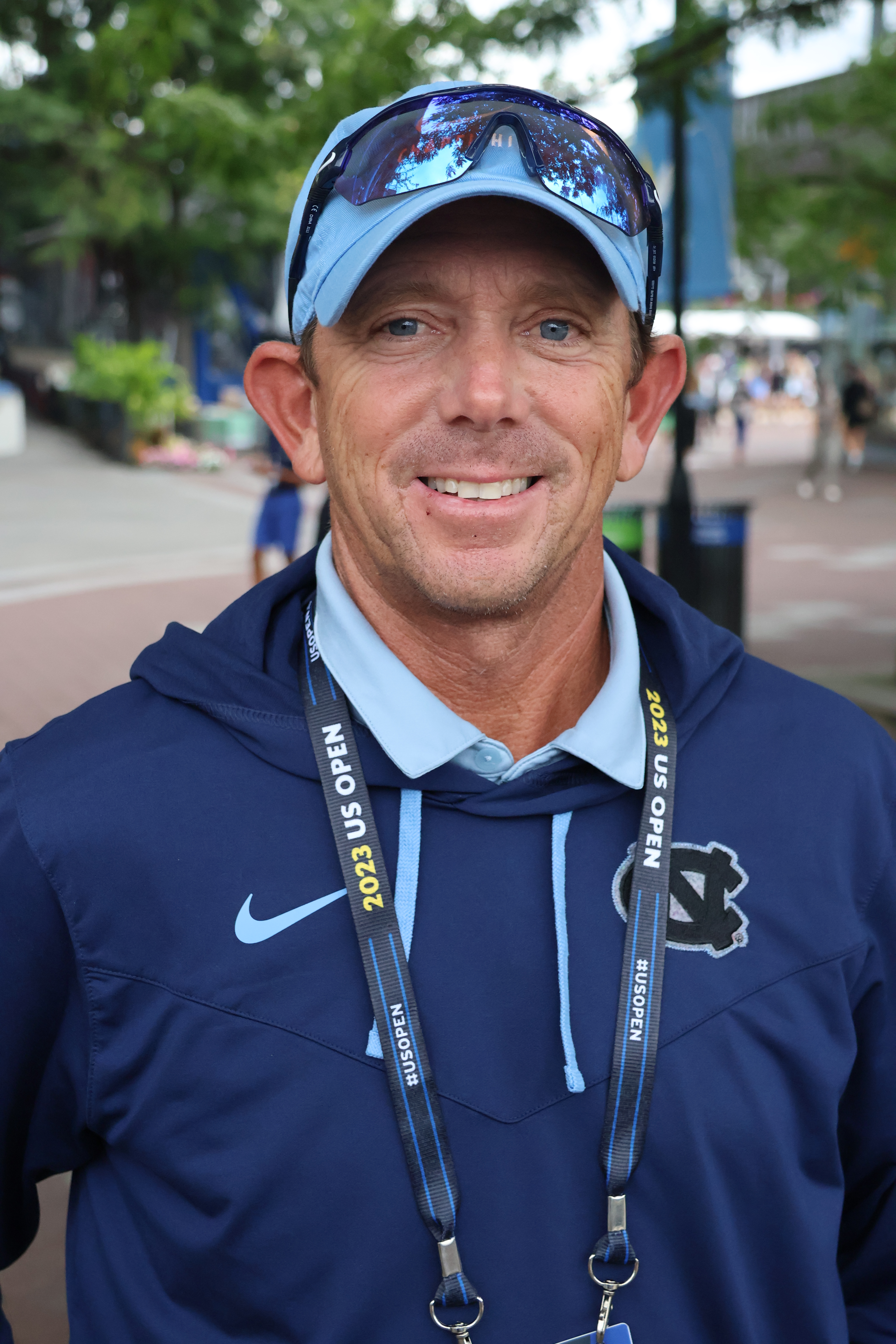
- Kalbas at the 2023 US Open
- Full name: Brian Kalbas
- Born: 1966 (age 59–60)
- Height: 5 ft 7 in (170 cm)
- College: Notre Dame (1985–1989)

Coaching career (1989–present)
- Notre Dame men's team (1989–1992); William & Mary women's team (1992–2003); North Carolina women's team (2003–present)

Coaching awards and records
- Awards ITA Coach of the Year (1998, 2010, 2023)
- Last updated on: July 1, 2023.

Brian Kalbas (born 1966) is an American college tennis coach. He has been the head coach of the North Carolina Tar Heels women's tennis team since 2003. He played college tennis and started his coaching career at the University of Notre Dame before becoming the head women's tennis coach at the College of William & Mary in 1992. He is a three-time Intercollegiate Tennis Association (ITA) Coach of the Year and the winningest women's tennis coach in Atlantic Coast Conference (ACC) history.

== College career ==
Kalbas attended the University of Notre Dame in Notre Dame, Indiana, where he played for the Fighting Irish tennis team. He compiled a singles record of 85 wins, 54 losses, playing mostly in the team's No. 1 or No. 2 spot. A strong counterpuncher, he made up for his 5-foot-7-inch (1.70 m) size with good court awareness, grit, and a willingness to play through injury. Teammates considered him an informal leader by his junior year. As the team captain in his senior year in 1988–89, he missed half of the season due to a sore shoulder and other injuries and fell to No. 3; he had helped recruit the player, freshman David DiLucia, who replaced him in the top spot. Before the end of his senior year, he was hired as an assistant coach for the next season.

== Coaching career ==
Kalbas remained an assistant coach at Notre Dame for three years. In his last year, Notre Dame reached the final of the 1992 NCAA Championships.

Kalbas served as the head coach of the William & Mary Tribe women's team from 1992 to 2003. The team, under Kalbas, won the Colonial Athletic Association (CAA; now Coastal Athletic Association) league title nine times. The Intercollegiate Tennis Association (ITA) named him Coach of the Year in 1998, the year of William & Mary's second consecutive quarterfinal finish in the NCAA Championships.

Kalbas became the head coach of the University of North Carolina women's team in the summer of 2003. Since its breakthrough 2009–10 season, the team has consistently held a place in the top 5 of the ITA rankings, and they have won the ACC Championships six times and the ITA National Team Indoor Championships seven times. In Kalbas's twentieth season, North Carolina won its first NCAA team title at the 2023 Championships; he had led the program to five previous appearances in the NCAA semifinals, including one final appearance in 2014. One of his North Carolina players has won an NCAA singles title (Jamie Loeb in 2015), and three North Carolina teams have won the NCAA doubles title (Jenna Long/Sara Anundsen in 2007, Makenna Jones/Elizabeth Scotty in 2021, and Fiona Crawley/Carson Tanguilig in 2023). Kalbas was named the national Coach of the Year in 2010 and 2023. The active leader in NCAA Division I dual match wins as a coach, he has signed a contract extension with North Carolina through 2027.

== Personal life ==
Kalbas has two children with his wife, Suzanne. His brother, Tim Kalbas, was a fellow member of the Notre Dame tennis team.
