= Jackson River =

Jackson River is the name of rivers and places:

== Rivers ==
- Jackson River (New Zealand), New Zealand
- Jackson River (Florida), United States
- Jackson River (Virginia), United States

== Places ==
- Clifton Forge, Virginia, once known as Jackson's River Station

== See also ==
- Jackson (disambiguation)
- Jackson Lake (disambiguation)
- Jackson Rivera, Puerto Rican volleyball player
- Jackson Rivera (boxer), Venezuelan boxer
