= Jackson micropolitan area =

The Jackson micropolitan area may refer to:

- Jackson micropolitan area, Ohio
- Jackson micropolitan area, Wyoming–Idaho

== See also ==
- Jackson metropolitan area (disambiguation)
- Jackson (disambiguation)
