= General Jackson =

General Jackson may refer to:

== People ==
=== United Kingdom ===
- Alexander Cosby Jackson (1773–1827), British Army major general commanding Ceylon
- Arnold Jackson (British Army officer) (1891–1972), British Army brigadier general
- George Jackson (British Army officer) (1876–1958), British Army major general
- Henry Jackson (British Army officer) (1879–1972), British Army general
- James Jackson (British Army officer) (1790–1871), British Army general
- Mike Jackson (British Army officer) (b. 1944), British general
- Richard Downes Jackson (1777–1845), British Army lieutenant general
- William Jackson (British Army officer) (1917–1999), British Army general

=== United States ===
==== U.S. Army ====
- Andrew Jackson (1767–1845), U.S. Army general in the War of 1812 and seventh president of the United States
- Charles Douglas Jackson (1902–1964), U.S. Army general
- Conrad Feger Jackson (1813–1862), Union Army brigadier general
- Dennis K. Jackson (born 1946), U.S. Army major general
- Henry Jackson (Continental Army general) (1747–1809), Continental Army brevet brigadier general
- James S. Jackson (1823–1862), Union Army general, American Civil War
- Joseph Andrew Jackson Lightburn (1824–1901), Union Army brigadier general
- Michael Jackson (American soldier) (1734–1801), Continental Army brevet general from Massachusetts
- Nathaniel J. Jackson (1818–1892), Union Army brigadier general and brevet major general
- Stonewall Jackson (20th century general) (1891–1943), U.S. Army major general
- William Payne Jackson (1868–1945), U.S. Army brigadier general

==== Confederate States Army ====
- Alfred E. Jackson (1807–1889), Confederate States Army brigadier general
- Henry R. Jackson (1820–1898), Confederate States Army major general
- John K. Jackson (1828–1866), Confederate general, American Civil War
- Stonewall Jackson (1824–1863), Confederate general in the United States Civil War
- William Hicks Jackson (1835–1903), Confederate States Army brigadier general
- William Lowther Jackson (1825–1890), Confederate States Army brigadier general

==== Others ====
- Gilder D. Jackson Jr. (1893–1966), U.S. Marine Corps brigadier general
- James F. Jackson (born 1947), U.S. Air Force lieutenant general
- Joel D. Jackson (fl. 1990s–2020s), U.S. Air Force major general

=== Others ===
- Robert Jackson (general) (1886–1948), Australian Army major general

== Other uses ==
- General Jackson (riverboat)

== See also ==
- Aleksander Jaakson (1892–1942), Estonian Army major general
- Jackson Generals, a Minor League Baseball team in Jackson, Tennessee
- Attorney General Jackson (disambiguation)
- Jaxon (disambiguation)
