= Lake Jackson =

Lake Jackson may refer to:

== Lakes in the United States ==
- Lake Jackson (Leon County, Florida)
  - Lake Jackson Mounds Archaeological State Park
- Lake Jackson (Sebring, Florida)
- Lake Jackson (Georgia)

== Cities or towns in the United States ==
- Lake Jackson, Texas
- Lake Jackson, Virginia, which is situated on a reservoir called Lake Jackson

== See also ==
- Jackson Lake (disambiguation)
- Jackson Lake State Park (disambiguation), multiple parks
- Little Lake Jackson, Sebring, Florida
- Lake Jacksonville, Texas
- Lake Jacksonville (Illinois)
