= Stephen F. Austin High School (Austin, Texas) =

Public high school in Austin, Texas

Austin High School

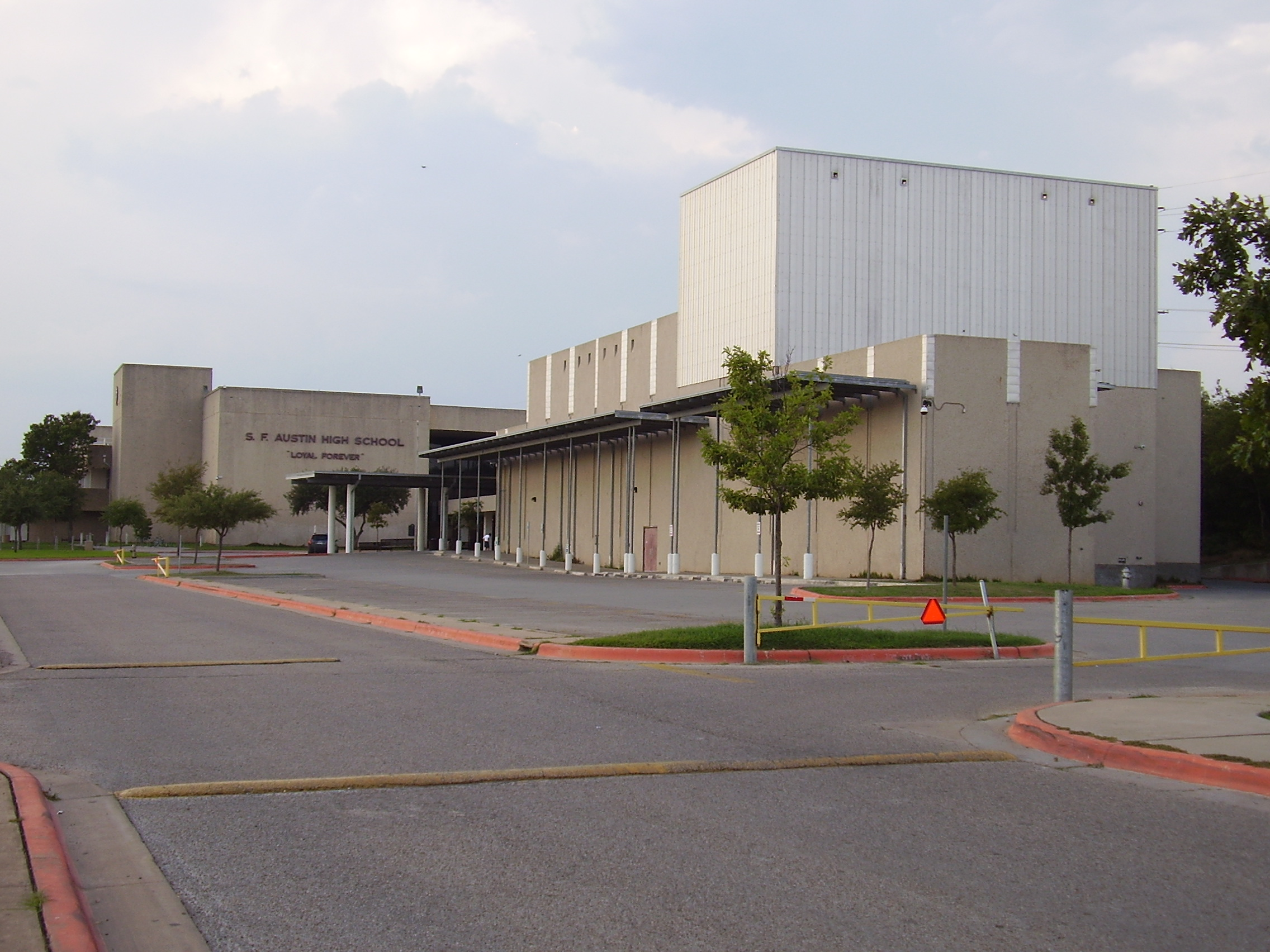

Location
- 1715 West Cesar Chavez Street; Austin, Texas; United States; 30°16′26″N 97°45′59″W

Information
- School type: Public, High school
- Motto: Loyal Forever
- Established: 1881; 145 years ago
- School district: Austin Independent School District
- Principal: Melvin Bedford
- Teaching staff: 126.63 (FTE)
- Grades: 9–12
- Enrollment: 2,239 (2025–2026)
- Student to teacher ratio: 18.13
- Colors: Maroon; White
- Athletics conference: UIL Class 6A
- Mascot: Mr. Maroo
- Team name: Maroons
- Website: Official website

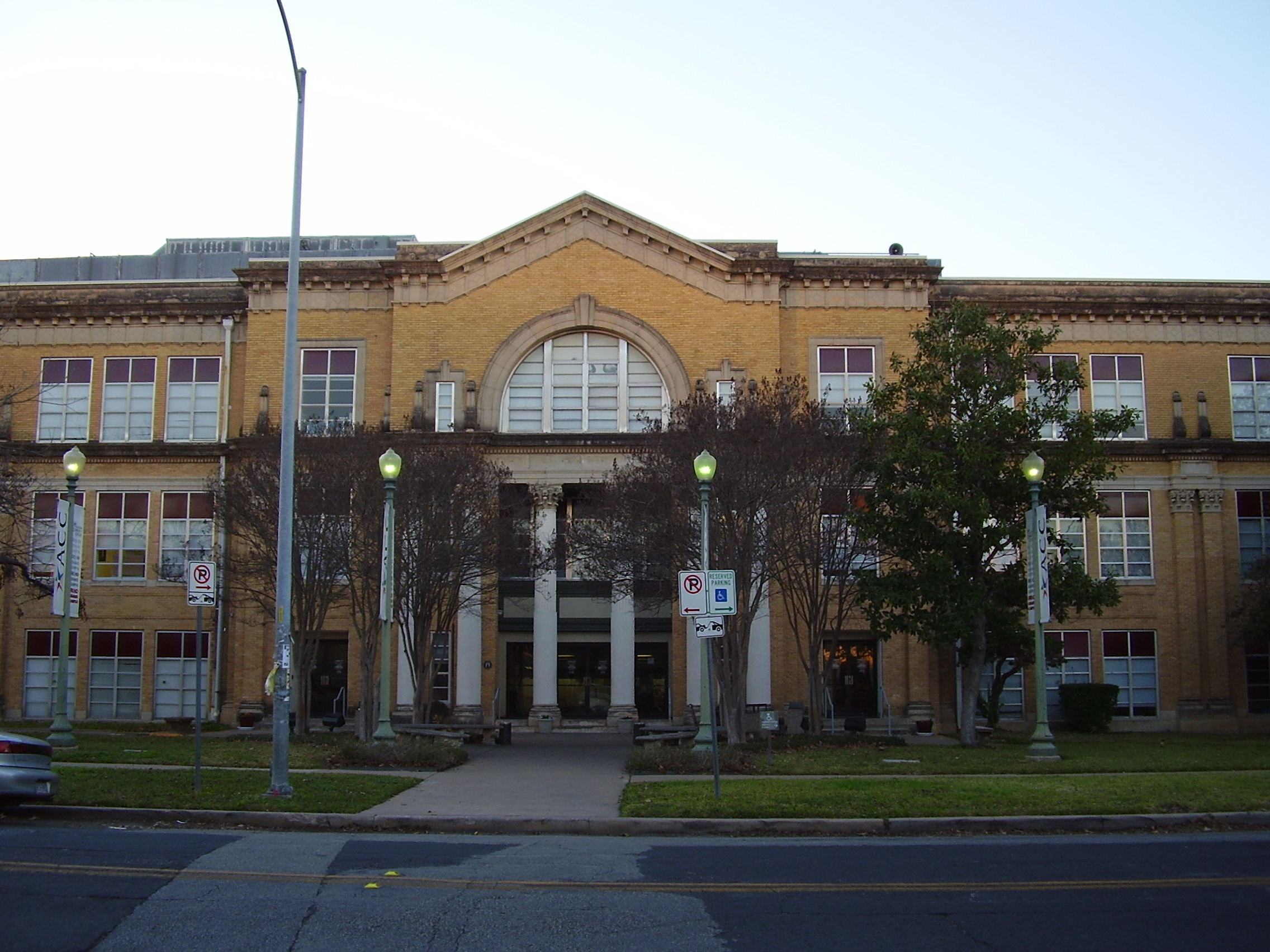
Austin Community College Rio Grande Campus, formerly Austin High School and John T. Allan Junior High School (est. 1916.)

Stephen F. Austin High School, more commonly known as Austin High, is a public high school in Austin, Texas, United States, and part of the Austin Independent School District (AISD). Founded in 1881, it is one of the oldest public high schools west of the Mississippi River, and was one of the first public high schools in the state of Texas.

The campus is located near Downtown Austin along the Colorado River (Lady Bird Lake). The school, originally known simply as Austin High School, was renamed in 1953 after Stephen F. Austin, locally revered as the "Father of Texas". It is one of thirteen high schools in the Austin Independent School District.

Roughly 2,300 students attend the school in grades nine through twelve. The school's current building is its seventh, following four 19th-century and two 20th-century locations in other buildings.

Austin High's official motto is Mens Agitat Molem (Latin: The Mind Moves the Masses) or, "Mind Over Matter". The official mascot is Mr. Maroo.

== History ==
Austin High School opened in September 1881, with classes held on the third floor of the West Austin School building at 11th Street and Rio Grande Street. Due to population growth, instruction was held at the First Baptist Church, the temporary State Capitol, and the Smith Opera House. The first dedicated Austin High School campus, located at 9th and Trinity Streets, opened in 1900. In 1925, Austin High School moved to 1212 Rio Grande Street, the former building of John T. Allan Junior High School (est. 1916), which had relocated to 9th at Trinity. Allan would relocate to East Austin in 1957, later convert to an elementary school, and close in 2013.

In 1956, the first seven African-American students began attending Austin High School as part of desegregation; a total of 13 black students attended white high schools in AISD at that time.

In 1975, Austin High School moved to its current building, designed by Jay W. Barnes II. The first classes at the Cesar Chavez campus commenced on August 25, 1975.

The Mr. Maroo mascot was officially adopted by the student council in the 1965–66 school year.

== Campus ==
The current campus is bounded by Lady Bird Lake (formerly Town Lake) to the south and a controlled-access portion of Cesar Chavez Street to the north. Because of the school's relative isolation and the campus's relative newness, Amy Wells, author of Both Sides Now: The Story of School Desegregation's Graduates, wrote that the school "has a somewhat suburban feel".

== Academics ==
As of the late 1970s the school was considered to be the best in its area, according to Wells. It was known for having a university preparatory curriculum.

Austin High was called a National Blue Ribbon School in 1982–83.

== Neighborhoods served ==
Downtown Austin, portions of Oak Hill, and the family apartment complexes of the University of Texas at Austin are zoned to Austin High School. Other Austin High neighborhoods include Zilker, Westcreek, Barton Hills, Travis Country, and Tarrytown.

Austin High School historically had a reputation as an elite school as it was associated with wealthy neighborhoods in the western part of Austin.

== Student body ==
As of November 2020, Austin High School is 54% non-Hispanic White, 35.3% Hispanic, 3.7% Black, and 2.3% Asian. The school is 23.5% economically disadvantaged and 7.2% of students are English Language Learners.

In 2000 the school was 54% non-Hispanic White, 37% Hispanic and Latino, 8% black, and 2% Asian, reflecting the overall demographics of Austin. As of 1980 most of the White students originated from west Austin, including Tarrytown. There were also middle class and poor students. Some black students originated from Clarksville, an area housing servants' quarters that, until school desegregation, was served by segregated black schools. By 1980, court-ordered desegregation added a heavily Hispanic and Latino section of South Austin, and a black section of northeast Austin to the student population.

As of the late 1970s the school was 66% White, 19% Hispanic, and 15% African-American, making it one of the more racially balanced AISD schools; at the time there was less Hispanic representation and more White representation than the district average. In 1980 the federal court system forced AISD to begin desegregation busing.

== Athletics ==
Austin High School offers many different athletic programs for students: football, basketball, tennis, golf, mountain biking, swimming, baseball, volleyball, soccer, track and field, cross country, lacrosse, water polo, ultimate frisbee, and cheerleading. The Austin High football team won the 1942 state championship.

== Notable alumni ==
- Sooraj Cherukat — Hanumankind, a rapper, singer, songwriter, and actor originally from Kerala, India
- Marshall Allman — actor, notable for roles on Humans, True Blood, and Prison Break
- Jake Andrews — blues rock guitarist
- Jessie Andrews — Peabody award for outstanding graduate, first female graduate of the University of Texas at Austin.
- Richard Moya — local and state politician
- Don Baylor — former Major League Baseball player and manager
- Ray Culp — Major League Baseball pitcher
- William Lee Bergstrom — high roller known for placing a single $777,000 bet on dice at the Horseshoe Casino in 1980
- Amy Moffett Brown — co-host of the Bobby Bones Show
- Barbara Bush — daughter of U.S. President George W. Bush
- Jenna Bush Hager — TV personality and daughter of U.S. President George W. Bush
- Liz Carpenter — author, lecturer, presidential advisor
- Gary Clark Jr. — Grammy Award-winning guitarist
- Ben Crenshaw — professional golfer, two-time winner of the Masters
- Lloyd Doggett — member of United States House of Representatives
- Bibb Falk — professional baseball player
- Kinky Friedman — comedian, politician
- Shakey Graves (Alejandro Rose-Garcia) — musician
- Kitty Harrison — former North Carolina Tar Heels women's tennis coach
- Isaiah "Zay" Jones — NFL wide receiver for the Jacksonville Jaguars
- Carole Keeton Strayhorn — politician, former Texas Comptroller
- Edmund Kuempel — state representative from Seguin
- Verne Lundquist — sportscaster, CBS Sports
- Ray Lynch — musician and composer
- Al Matthews— professional football player for the Green Bay Packers
- Mark McClellan — former Commissioner of the U.S. Food and Drug Administration and Administrator of the Centers for Medicare and Medicaid Services
- Scott McClellan — former White House Press Secretary for President George W. Bush and current Vice President for Communications at Seattle University
- Benjamin McKenzie — television actor; James Gordon in the television series Gotham
- Azie Taylor Morton — Treasurer of the United States under President Jimmy Carter
- David M. Parsons — 2011 Texas State Poet Laureate
- Harvey Penick — professional golfer
- Julie Powell — author of Julie & Julia
- Robin Wilson - founder CLEAN DESIGN HOME lifestyle brand, selected for Inc. Top 100 Female Founders list, named a 2024 NYU Distinguished Alumnus, and a 2013 Hall of Honor recipient
- Ben H. Procter — American historian at Texas Christian University, 1957–2000
- Richard "Cactus" Pryor — Texas radio legend
- Scott Ruffcorn — former Major League Baseball pitcher for the Chicago White Sox and Philadelphia Phillies
- Robert Schenkkan — award-winning playwright, screenwriter and actor
- Xavier Silas — former professional basketball player
- Django Walker — country music musician
