= Jackson's =

Jackson's or Jacksons may refer to:

== Businesses ==
- Jackson's (restaurant), in Perth, Western Australia
- William Jackson Food Group, a food manufacturer in the United Kingdom
- Jacksons Food Stores, an American West Coast convenience store chain
- Jacksons (department store), a department store chain in the United Kingdom
- Jacksons Stores, a British convenience store chain

== Places ==
- Jacksons Corner, a prominent landmark in Reading, Berkshire, England
- Jacksons, British Columbia, a settlement in British Columbia, Canada
- Jacksons, New Zealand, a settlement in New Zealand

== Others ==
- Jackson's House, student-body subdivision at Canadian secondary school Upper Canada College
- Jackson's chameleon

== See also ==
- Jackson (disambiguation)
- The Jacksons (disambiguation)
