= The Jacksons (disambiguation) =

The Jacksons or Jackson 5 are an American family singing group.

The Jacksons may also refer to:

- Jackson family, the entire family which includes the singing group
- The Jacksons (album), a 1976 album by the group
- The Jacksons (TV series), a 1976–1977 TV variety show starring most of the family
- The Jacksons: An American Dream, a 1992 miniseries about the family
- The Jacksons: A Family Dynasty, a 2009–2010 reality TV series starring the family
- The Jacksons: Next Generation, a 2015 reality TV series starring the members of the musical group 3T, part of the same family

== See also ==
- Jackson's (disambiguation)
- Jackson (disambiguation)
