= List of Women's Tennis Academic All-America Team Members of the Year =

Student athlete award

Women's Tennis Academic All-America Team Members of the Year
- Awarded for: The yearly outstanding women's tennis Academic All-America team member
- Country: United States and Canada
- Presented by: College Sports Communicators

History
- Most recent: Reese Brantmeier, University of North Carolina; Emily Buchanan, Mississippi College; Emily Kantrovitz, Emory University; Line Jensen, Morningside University
- Next ceremony: June 2027
- Website: official site

The Women's Tennis Academic All-America Team Member of the Year is the annual most outstanding singular college tennis athlete of the set of female tennis athletes selected for the Academic All-America Teams in a given year.

== Four-division era (2023–present) ==
Key
†	Indicates winners of the all-sports Academic All-America award.

All winners are American unless indicated otherwise.

Women's Tennis Academic All-America Team Members of the Year (2023–present)
Year	Division I		Division II		Division III		College/NAIA (Note: College Division, 2011–19; NAIA, 2018–present)	
Year	Winner	School	Winner	School	Winner	School	Winner	School
2023	Kit Gulihur	North Florida	(France) Nastassia Chamoun	Newberry	Hannah Kassaie	Case Western Reserve	(Czech Republic) Tereza Koplova	Georgia Gwinnett
2024	Connie Ma	Stanford	(France) Anais Ruyssen	Wayne State	Angie Zhou	Pomona–Pitzer	(Venezuela) Stephanie Fernandez	Georgia Gwinnett
2025	Reese Brantmeier	North Carolina	(Austria) Amelie Gindl	Southern Arkansas	Angie Zhou	Pomona–Pitzer	Lucy Carpenter	Loyola New Orleans
2026	Reese Brantmeier	North Carolina	Emily Buchanan	Mississippi College	Emily Kantrovitz	Emory	(Denmark) Line Jensen	Morningside
