= Jackson Correctional Institution =

Jackson Correctional Institution may refer to:

- Jackson Correctional Institution (Florida)
- Jackson Correctional Institution (Wisconsin)
