= John Irick House =

- U.S. National Register of Historic Places
- New Jersey Register of Historic Places
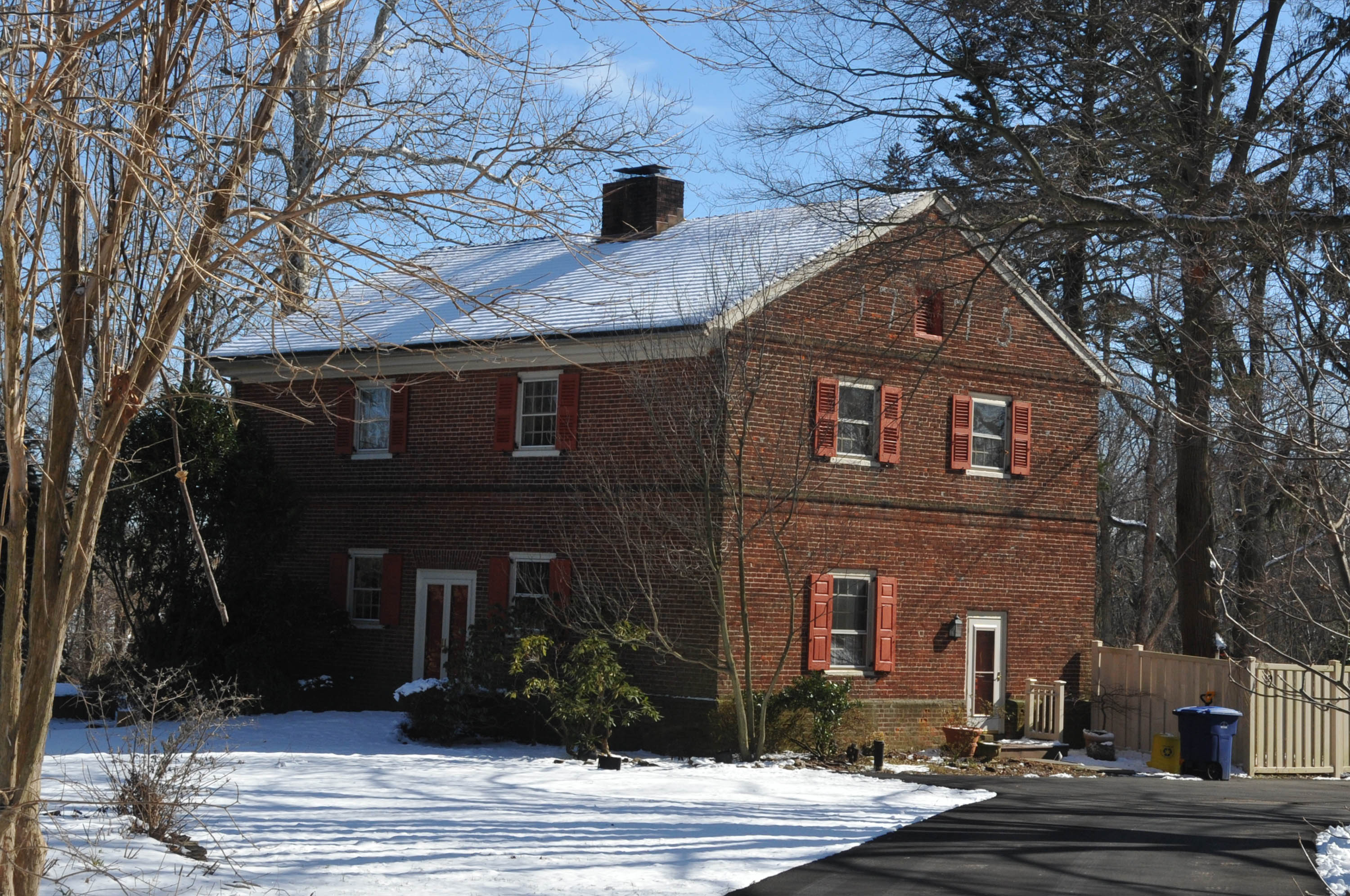

- Location within Burlington County, New Jersey Location within New Jersey Location within the United States
- Location: Jacksonville-Jobstown Road, Springfield Township, Burlington County, New Jersey
- Coordinates: 40°03′02″N 74°45′48″W
- Built: 1761
- NRHP reference No.: 77000849
- NJRHP No.: 872

Significant dates
- Added to NRHP: September 16, 1977
- Designated NJRHP: December 1, 1976

The John Irick House, also known as the Dunker House, is located on Jacksonville-Jobstown Road in the Jacksonville section of Springfield Township in Burlington County, New Jersey, United States. The brick house was built in 1761 and was added to the National Register of Historic Places on September 16, 1977, for its significance in architecture. It is also noted in the Traditional Patterned Brickwork Buildings in New Jersey Multiple Property Submission (MPS).

== History and description ==
The house was originally built in 1761 and later expanded to two stories. It features patterned brickwork and a gable end date. The house was owned by John Irick from 1901 to 1904. According to the nomination form, he was a civil-minded farmer who donated land for a local school house.

== See also ==
- National Register of Historic Places listings in Burlington County, New Jersey
