= North Carolina Tar Heels women's tennis =

American college tennis team

- University: University of North Carolina at Chapel Hill
- Head coach: Brian Kalbas (20th season)
- Conference: ACC
- Location: Chapel Hill, North Carolina, US
- Home Court: Cone-Kenfield Tennis Center
- Nickname: Tar Heels
- Colors: Carolina blue and white

NCAA Tournament championships
- 2023

NCAA Tournament runner-up
- 2014

NCAA Tournament Semifinals
- 2010, 2014, 2019, 2021, 2022, 2023

NCAA Tournament Quarterfinals
- 2010, 2013, 2014, 2015, 2017, 2019, 2021, 2022, 2023

Conference Tournament championships
- 1977, 1978, 1979, 1980, 2002, 2011, 2016, 2017, 2018, 2019, 2021, 2024

Conference regular season champions
- 1979, 1980, 1984, 1987, 2010, 2013, 2014, 2015, 2016, 2017, 2019, 2021, 2022, 2023, 2024

The North Carolina Tar Heels women's tennis team, commonly referred to as Carolina, represents the University of North Carolina at Chapel Hill in NCAA Division I college tennis. North Carolina currently competes as a member of the Atlantic Coast Conference (ACC) and plays its home matches at Cone-Kenfield Tennis Center.

== History ==
The team's history in the NCAA Championships includes one championship in 2023, one runner-up finish in 2014, and seven other appearances in at least the quarterfinals (2013, 2015, 2017, 2018, 2019, 2021, 2022). The Tar Heels have won the ITA National Team Indoor Championship seven times (2013, 2015, 2018, 2020, 2021, 2022, 2023). Additionally, the program boasts Twelve ACC tournament championships.

The team is currently led by Brian Kalbas, UNC's all-time wins leader. Kalbas compiled an .836 career winning percentage (513 out of 614 matches) over his first 20 seasons at North Carolina, the highest in ACC history. Previous coaches include Frances Hogan, Kitty Harrison, and Roland Thornqvist.

== Notable former players ==
- Jamie Loeb
- Hayley Carter

== Honors ==
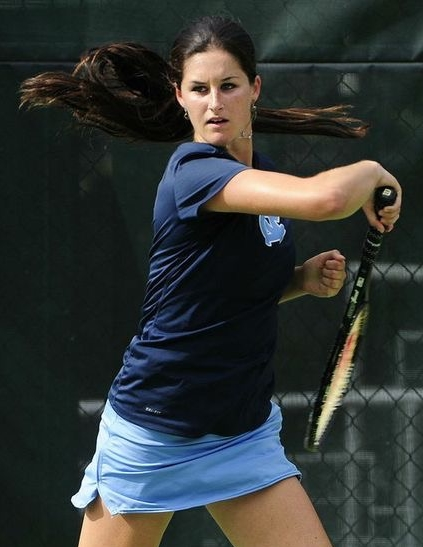
Jamie Loeb at UNC in 2013

=== Individual NCAA Champions ===
- Jamie Loeb (2015)
- Reese Brantmeier (2025)

=== Doubles NCAA Champions ===
- Jenna Long/Sara Anundsen (2007)
- Makenna Jones/Elizabeth Scotty (2021)
- Fiona Crawley/Carson Tanguilig (2023)

=== All-Americans ===
- Cinda Gurney (1992, 1993)
- Alisha Portnoy (1993)
- Marlene Mejia (2001)
- Kate Pinchbeck (2002, 2003)
- Kendall Cline (2003, 2005)
- Aniela Mojzis (2003, 2004, 2005)
- Sara Anundsen (2006, 2007)
- Jenna Long (2006, 2007)
- Sanaz Marand (2008, 2009)
- Sophie Grabinski (2009)
- Zoe De Bruycker (2011)
- Shinann Featherston (2011, 2012)
- Lauren McHale (2011, 2012)
- Caroline Price (2013, 2014)
- Gina Suarez-Malaguti (2013)
- Hayley Carter (2014, 2015, 2016, 2017)
- Jamie Loeb (2014, 2015)
- Whitney Kay (2014, 2016)
- Sara Daavettila (2017, 2018, 2019, 2020, 2021)
- Jessie Aney (2017, 2018)
- Makenna Jones (2018, 2019, 2021)
- Alexa Graham (2018, 2019, 2020, 2021)
- Alle Sanford (2018)
- Cameron Morra (2019, 2020, 2021, 2022)
- Elizabeth Scotty (2021, 2022)
- Fiona Crawley (2022, 2023)
- Carson Tanguilig (2022)
- Reese Brantmeier (2023)

=== ITA National Coach of the Year ===
- 2010, 2023: Brian Kalbas

Information about honors and former players cited from the 2019 team yearbook
