= Attorney General Jackson =

Attorney General Jackson may refer to:

- Edward St John Jackson (1886–1961), Attorney General of Ceylon
- Fred S. Jackson (1868–1931), Attorney General of Kansas
- Mortimer M. Jackson (1809–1889), Attorney General of the Wisconsin Territory
- Robert H. Jackson (1892–1954), Attorney General of the United States
- Samuel D. Jackson (1895–1951), Attorney General of Indiana
- William S. Jackson (died 1932), Attorney General of New York

== See also ==
- General Jackson (disambiguation)
