= Jackson station =

Jackson station may refer to:

== Stations ==
- Jackson station (CTA Blue Line), Chicago, Illinois
- Jackson station (CTA Red Line), Chicago, Illinois
- Jackson station (Michigan), in Jackson, Michigan

== Settlements ==
- Jackson, Indiana, also known as Jackson Station

== See also ==
- Jackson (disambiguation)
- Jackson/Euclid station, a light rail station in Salt Lake City, Utah
- Jackson Avenue station (IRT White Plains Road Line), in Bronx, New York
- Vernon Boulevard–Jackson Avenue station, a subway station in Queens, New York
- Jackson Heights–Roosevelt Avenue/74th Street station, a subway station in Queens, New York
- 82nd Street–Jackson Heights station, a subway station in Queens, New York
- Jackson Street, a trolley stop on the Media–Sharon Hill Line in Media, Pennsylvania
- Jackson Street electric railway station, in Grimsby, England
- Jackson Square station, in Boston, Massachusetts
- Martin Luther King Drive station, a light rail station on the former site of the Central Railroad of New Jersey's Jackson Avenue station
- Union Station (Jackson, Mississippi)
