= Jackson Lake =

Jackson Lake may refer to:

== Places ==
- Jackson Lake (California)
- Jackson Lake (Georgia)
- Jackson Lake (Wyoming)
  - Jackson Lake Dam, Wyoming
  - Jackson Lake Lodge, Wyoming, a U.S. National Historic Place
  - Jackson Lake Ranger Station, Wyoming, a U.S. National Historic Place
- Jackson Lake, Colorado
- Jackson Lake State Park (Colorado)
- Jackson Lake State Park (Ohio)

== Television ==
- Jackson Lake, a character played by David Morrissey in the Doctor Who Christmas special "The Next Doctor"

== See also ==
- Lake Jackson (disambiguation)
- Lake Jackson Mounds Archaeological State Park, Florida
- Stonewall Jackson Lake State Park in West Virginia
