= Jacksonville, New Jersey =

Populated place in Burlington County, New Jersey, US

- Unincorporated community
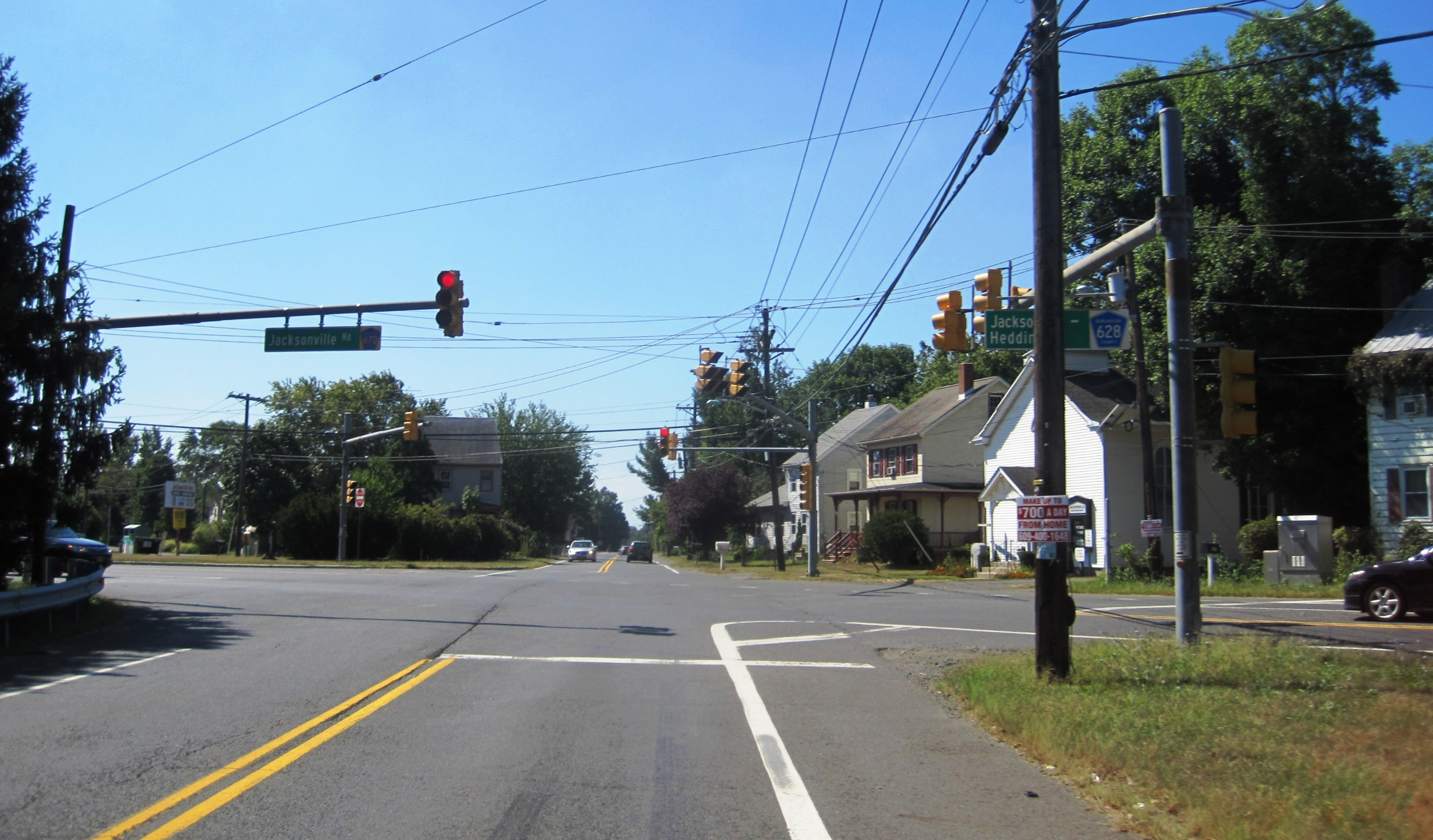
- Center of Jacksonville

- Location in Burlington County (Inset: Burlington County in New Jersey) Jacksonville (New Jersey) Jacksonville (the United States)
- Coordinates: 40°03′01″N 74°45′49″W
- Country: United States
- State: New Jersey
- County: Burlington
- Township: Springfield
- Elevation: 62 ft (19 m)
- Time zone: UTC−05:00 (Eastern (EST))
  - Summer (DST): UTC−04:00 (Eastern (EDT))
- GNIS feature ID: 877396

Jacksonville is an unincorporated community located within Springfield Township, in Burlington County, in the U.S. state of New Jersey. Located at a skewed intersection of County Routes 628 and 670, the area consists of farmland and houses. It had a population of nearly one hundred by 1883. The area also has the remains of the Animal Kingdom Zoo, a small zoo shuttered since 2012 due to deadly fires and numerous animal welfare violations. The John Irick House located in the community was listed on the National Register of Historic Places in 1977.
