= Jacksons (department store) =

Former English department store chain

E. Jackson & Sons Limited
- Company type: Private
- Industry: Retail
- Genre: Department store
- Founded: 17 September 1875; 150 years ago
- Founder: Edward Jackson
- Defunct: 24 December 2013; 12 years ago
- Headquarters: Reading, Berkshire, United Kingdom
- Number of locations: 7
- Key people: Brian Carter (Managing Director)
- Owner: Jackson family
- Website: jacksonsofreading.co.uk

Jacksons was an English department store chain. It was founded by Edward Jackson in September 1875. Its flagship branch was located in central Reading, Berkshire, occupying a prominent site, Jacksons Corner, on Kings Road, just south of Market Place. Deep underneath the building runs a culvert of The Holy Brook waterway. Jacksons expanded and at its peak operated from seven locations. It closed its remaining original store in Reading in December 2013. Throughout its history, the company was owned by its founding family.

== History ==
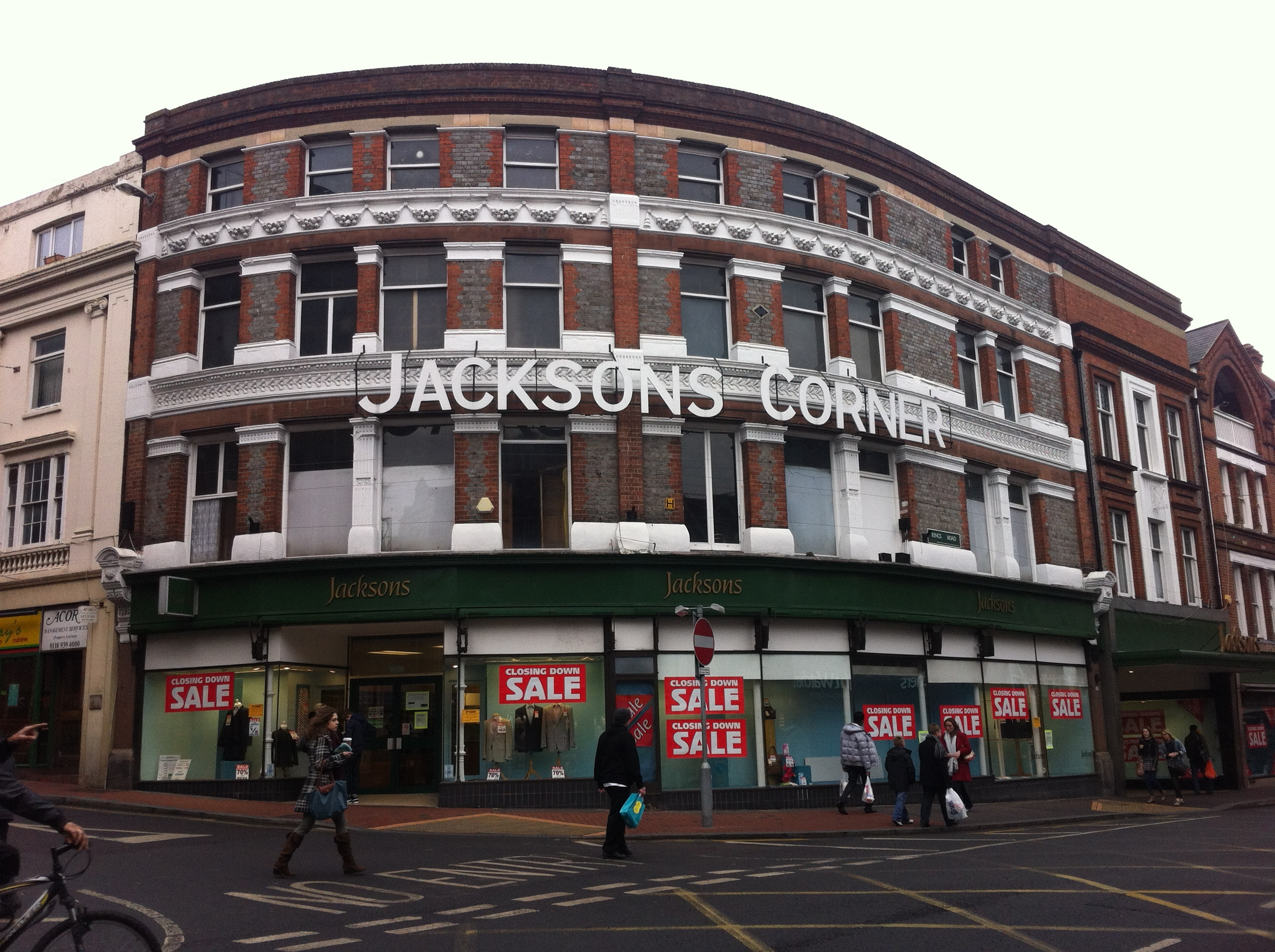
Jacksons of Reading in 2013

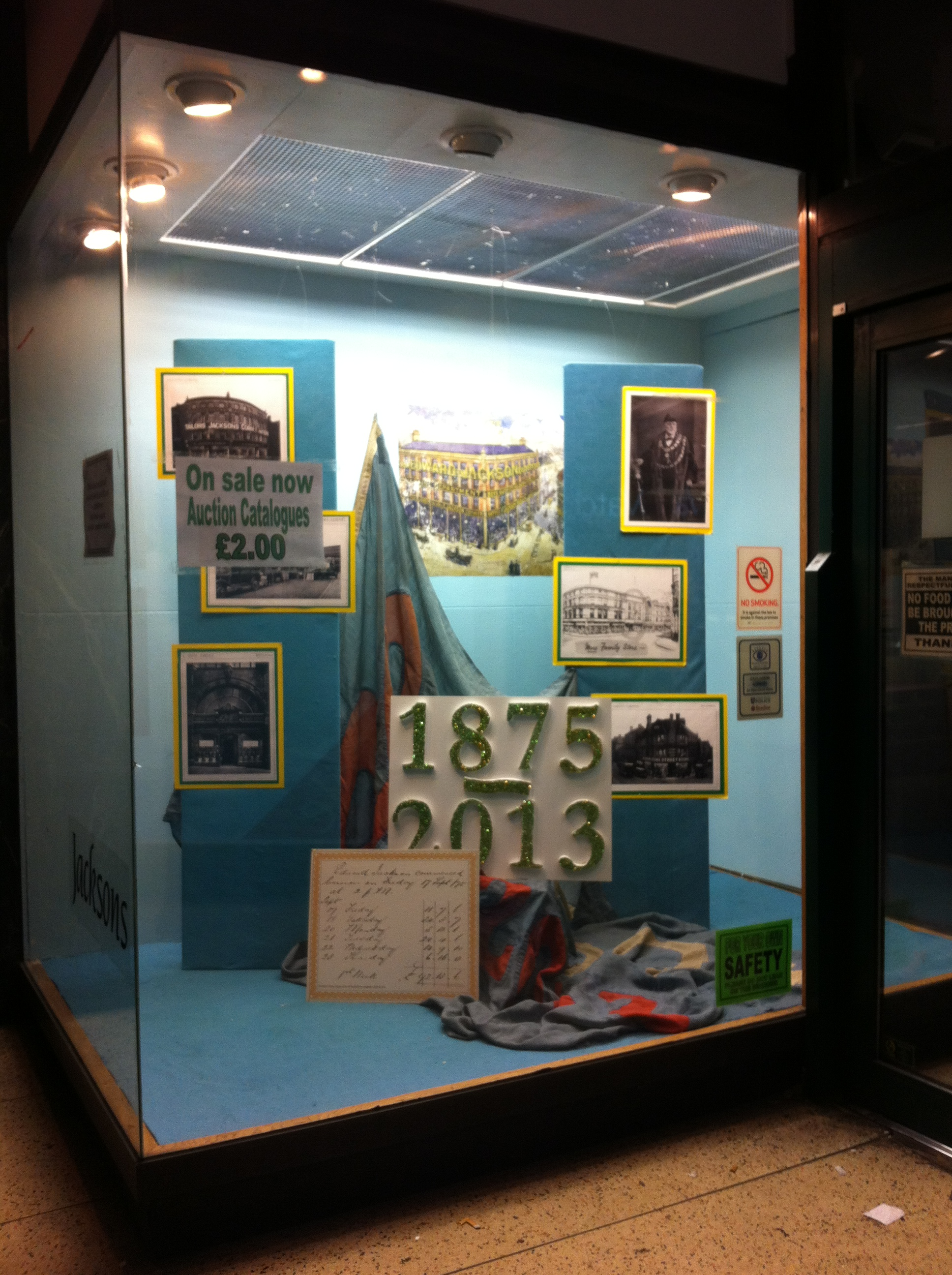
Jacksons of Reading, the last window display commemorating 1875-2013

On 17 September 1875, Edward Jackson founded the gentlemen’s outfitters shop in Kings Road, Reading. The business was incorporated as E. Jackson & Sons Ltd. on 23 December 1919. The business expanded into a department store occupying the whole of the corner on the corner of Kings Road and High Street, just south of Market Place, selling womenswear, lingerie, shoes, knitting supplies, craft supplies, textiles, and it also became one of Reading’s principal suppliers of schoolwear.

The company later expanded, and opened stores in Caversham, Goring-on-Thames, Bracknell, Camberley, Henley and Oxford, but these had all closed by 1994. This left open just its original store in Reading, which was then branded Jacksons of Reading.

The founder’s great-grandson, Brian Carter, started working for the firm in the 1960s, rising to become its Managing Director, a position he retained until the business closed on 24 December 2013.

== Department store locations ==
- Bracknell (closed)
- Camberley (closed)
- Caversham (closed in 1994)
- Goring-on-Thames (closed)
- Henley-on-Thames (closed)
- Oxford (closed)
- Reading (closed in 2013)

There were also further branches in Reading at Duke Street Corner (Jacksons Hardware Department, closed in 1928) No 215, London Road (closed), No 8, High Street (Boot and Shoe Department, closed) and No 21-23, Oxford Road (closed). In c.1901 both Jacksons stores on Kings Road and Duke Street were known as "Jacksons Corners".

== Jacksons of Reading ==
Jacksons’ flagship branch was located in Reading, Berkshire.

=== Pneumatic tube network ===
The store operated a network of pneumatic tubes made by Lamson Engineering, which transported cash and documents around the building. Installed in the 1940s, it was the last such system still functioning anywhere. A customer’s cash and a ticket, stating the item(s) purchased, would be placed in a capsule by the sales' assistant; the capsule would be delivered via the pneumatic network to the cash office; the receipt and change would be returned to the customer in another capsule. According to Carter, by centralising the cash collection, the system helped avoid thefts from the various small areas of the store, which otherwise would have each needed a cash register. At the closing auction, the system was purchased for £900 (+ VAT and commission) by the man who had been maintaining it for the past 20 years.

Part of the system is now in the care of Thomas Macey, archivist of the store, who now owns two of the cash stations and a part of the cash desk. This will be restored to working order.

=== Sign ===
As well as the building itself, the sign "Jacksons Corner" on the exterior of the building also became a local landmark. When the closure was announced there was concern over whether the lettering would be preserved.

=== Closure ===
In October 2012, staff were informed that the store would close the following year. Brian Carter cited building maintenance costs and the nearby Oracle shopping centre as primary reasons for the closure. It closed on 24 December 2013 after 138 years of business, with the loss of 60 jobs. The vast majority of the shop fittings were disposed of in a very well attended auction inside the shop itself on 4 January 2014. The auction raised £75,000.

The company archives, which consist of over 200 items, including old cash receipts, catalogues, photos and adverts, are in the care of Thomas Macey. Many of the items date back to 1875, including Edward Jackson's cash book, with the first day's takings recorded and a receipt (dated 1877) from the first shop at No 6, High Street, Reading.

The school uniforms department, which had become a significant part of the business, has been continued by Stevensons at 11-12, Market Place, Reading. Stevensons is an independent family-owned school uniform and sportswear business, also long established (c. 1925) and has taken over the supply of uniforms for 28 schools in the surrounding towns, such as Reading Girls' and Reading Boys' Schools, Sherfield School, Hook; Crosfields School, Shinfield, Reading; Maiden Erlegh, Reading and Ranelagh School, Bracknell.

The Economist newspaper marked Jacksons’ passing by suggesting "you can be too authentic".

=== The site today ===
In 2016, planning permission for 33 flats on the upper floors of the former store was approved, with the first flats having opened in 2021. A Thai cafe and restaurant is set to open on the ground floor.

== In popular culture ==
Jackson's archivist, Thomas Macey, published a book on the history of the store in 2009, Jacksons: E. Jackson & Sons Ltd.

Shortly before the store closed a theatre play, written by Benedict Sandiford and directed by Cassie Friend, was organised by South Street arts centre celebrating the store. Performances took place in November and December 2013, mainly in the Jacksons store itself. Part of the performance has been uploaded to YouTube.

In the weeks before it closed, Lea Winchcombe filmed material for a series of short documentaries on Jacksons.

Jacksons is featured briefly in the PBS Documentary "Secrets of Selfridges". The small interview covers a few of the strict guidelines for staff members in the early 1900s, as well as a look at the previously unseen upper floor, which houses the former staff quarters.

Reading Museum put on a "Jacksons Closing Down Display" from November 2013, scheduled to end April 2014.

The store’s window displays inspired a Facebook group, The Windows of My Soul. At the dispersal auction "Cruella", the child mannequin which the group had helped to make famous, sold for £966, which received a round of applause.

The interior of Jacksons was used for an episode of the television series Endeavour called ‘Sway’, first broadcast in April 2014. The school uniform department was turned into a ladieswear department. The Lamson cash-conveying system was also used in the filming.
