= Jackson metropolitan area =

The Jackson metropolitan area may refer to the following in the United States:

- Jackson metropolitan area, Mississippi
- Jackson metropolitan area, Tennessee
- Jackson County, Michigan, comprises the Jackson metropolitan area in Michigan
- Jackson micropolitan area, Ohio
- Jackson micropolitan area, Wyoming–Idaho

== See also ==
- Jacksonville metropolitan area (disambiguation)
