= Jackson Lake Ranger Station =

- U.S. National Register of Historic Places
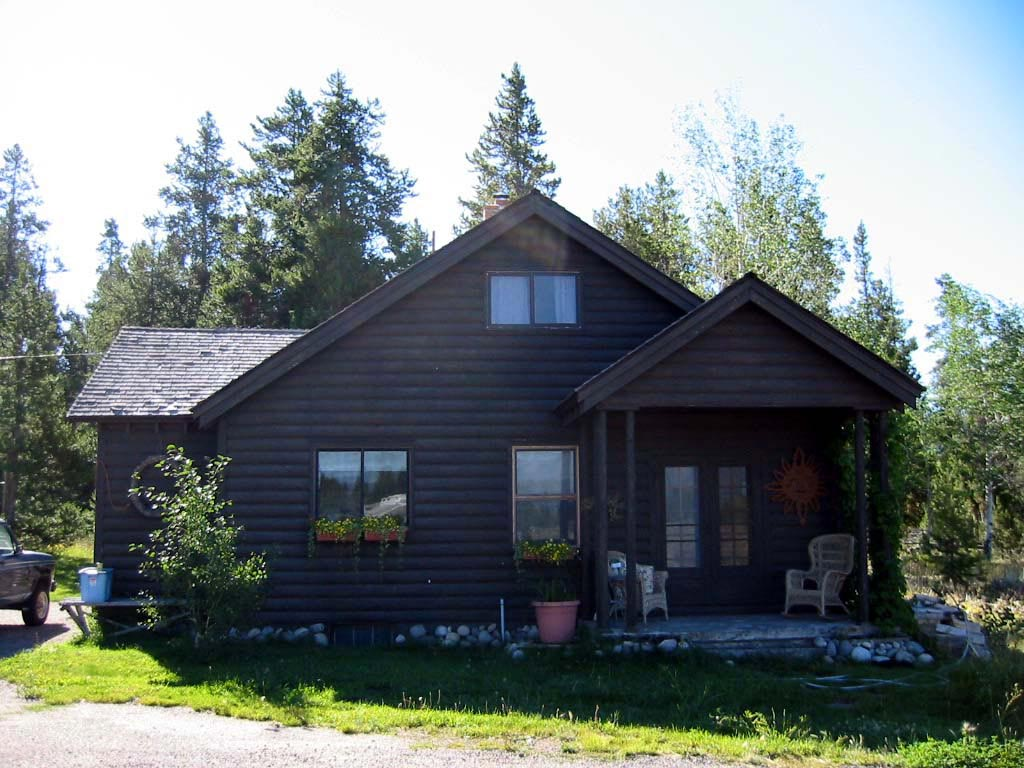

- Location within Wyoming Location within the United States
- Nearest city: Moose, Wyoming
- Coordinates: 43°52′18″N 110°34′14″W
- Architect: U.S. Forest Service
- MPS: Grand Teton National Park MPS
- NRHP reference No.: 90000620
- Added to NRHP: April 23, 1990

The Jackson Lake Ranger Station is the last Depression-era U.S. Forest Service ranger station in its original location in Grand Teton National Park. When first established, the park comprised only the mountainous terrain above Jackson Hole, while the remainder of what would eventually become the park was administered by the Forest Service as part of Teton National Forest. The Jackson Lake Station was built in 1933 as close as possible to Park Service property as possible as a kind of resistance to the park's expansion. The station was one of five Forest Service stations in the area, and was taken over by the National Park Service when Jackson Hole National Monument was established in 1943, later becoming an enlarged Grand Teton National Park. It is the only such station not to have been moved or altered by the Park Service.

== Description ==
The ranger station building is a 1-1/2 story log structure typical of the rustic bungalow style used by the Forest Service for its buildings of the era. An outhouse, 1-1/2 story garage and 2-1/2 story barn complete the grouping. The site is on the Teton Park Road overlooking the Willow Flats and Jackson Lake. Of the five Forest Service ranger stations in the area, the Jackson Lake station is the only one not to have been moved or rebuilt after the Park Service takeover.

== Forest Service vs. Park Service ==
The enlargement of Grand Teton National Park was the subject of bitter disagreement in the local population and of resentment in the Forest Service, which had opposed the transfer. When the Forest Service vacated the Jackson Lake station in 1943 it took all of the station's furnishings and fixtures, interpreting "movable equipment" to include piping, plumbing fixtures, doors and cabinets. A four-foot wide hole was cut in the floor to remove an underground water tank, leaving the building in poor condition. In advance of a visit by congressmen in 1943 a live skunk was placed in the building, dying there. Public opinion blamed Forest Service personnel who did not wish the congressional delegation to see the damage.

The Jackson Lake Ranger Station was placed on the National Register of Historic Places on April 23, 1990.

== See also ==
- Historical buildings and structures of Grand Teton National Park
