= Jaxon =

Jaxon may refer to:

- Jaxon (name), a given name and surname, including a list of people with the name
- Jaxon (cartoonist), American cartoonist, illustrator, historian, and writer
- Jaxon (musician), English progressive rock saxophonist, flautist, and composer David Jackson (born 1947)
- Jaxon, a demonym for a person from Jacksonville, Florida

== See also ==
- Jackson (disambiguation)
