= Dennis Van der Meer =

South African tennis administrator and coach

- Country (sports): United States
- Born: 2 March 1933; South West Africa
- Died: 27 July 2019 (aged 86); South Carolina
- Int. Tennis HoF: 2021 (member page)

Coaching career
- Amanda Coetzer

Dennis Douglas Van der Meer (2 March 1933 – 27 July 2019) was a South West African born, American tennis administrator, instructor and coach.

== Early life ==
Van der Meer was born in South West Africa as Dennis Douglas van der Merwe, the fourth child of Maria Dorothea van der Merwe (née Hagen) and Isak Jacobus van der Merwe, a minister of religion. He received his schooling at Jan van Riebeeck High School in Cape Town, South Africa, and in 1950 played for the Western Province junior tennis team. He later also played for the senior Western Province team.

== Career ==
At the age of nineteen, Van der Meer took part in the South African Davis Cup trials but was unsuccessful. He then decided to focus on coaching and started working in the Johannesburg area, where he soon made a name for himself.

In 1961 Van der Meer emigrated to the United States where he settled in California and taught at the Berkeley Tennis Club. It was at this time that Dennis changed his surname from Van der Merwe to Van der Meer. In the early 1970s he went to South Carolina where he bought property on Hilton Head Island in order to set up a tennis academy and founded the Van Der Meer TennisUniversity in 1973, the Professional Tennis Registry in 1976, and the Professional Tennis Registry Foundation in 1978.

At the academy he coached numerous players, from junior level to professional. His coaching included assisting both Margaret Court and Billie Jean King during the "Battle of the Sexes" with Bobby Riggs. He also regularly acted as the coach for Amanda Coetzer and under his guidance, Coetzer reached third place in the WTA rankings.

As president of the USPTR, Van der Meer traveled extensively around the world, holding training workshops for coaches under his TennisUniversity business, then certifying them into the USPTR using USPTR testers.

== Honours ==
- Tennis Educational Merit Award from the International Hall of Fame in 1969.
- Award as Developmental Coach of the Year from the US Olympic Committee in 1997.
- International Tennis Federation Service to the Game Award in 1999.
- Honorary doctorate from the University of Greenwich, England in 2004.
- Inducted into the International Tennis Hall of Fame in 2021. (posthumously)

== Books ==
Van der Meer has written several books on tennis coaching, including:

- Tennis Clinic; Play the TennisAmerican Way, 1974 (with Murray Olderman)
- Dennis Van der Meer's Strokes and Strategies, 1977
- Dennis Van der Meer's Complete book of tennis, 1982
- Dennis Van Der Meer's Complete Book of Tennis Strategy, 1987 (with Eddie Parker)
- Mind Over Tennis-Canc, 2002 (with James Loehr)
