= Jackson County =

Jackson County may refer to the following counties in the United States:

- Jackson County, Alabama
- Jackson County, Arkansas
- Jackson County, Colorado
  - Jackson County, Jefferson Territory
- Jackson County, Florida
- Jackson County, Georgia
- Jackson County, Illinois
- Jackson County, Indiana
- Jackson County, Iowa
- Jackson County, Kansas
- Jackson County, Kentucky
- Jackson County, Michigan
- Jackson County, Minnesota
- Jackson County, Mississippi
- Jackson County, Missouri
- Jackson County, North Carolina
- Jackson County, Ohio
- Jackson County, Oklahoma
- Jackson County, Oregon
- Jackson County, South Dakota
- Jackson County, Tennessee
- Jackson County, Texas
- Jackson County, West Virginia
- Jackson County, Wisconsin

== See also ==
- Jackson Parish, Louisiana
