= Jacksonville metropolitan area (disambiguation) =

The Jacksonville metropolitan area is the metropolitan area centered on Jacksonville, Florida.

Jacksonville metropolitan area may also refer to:

- Onslow County, North Carolina, comprises the Jacksonville, North Carolina, metropolitan area
- Jacksonville, Illinois, micropolitan area
- Cherokee County, Texas, comprises the Jacksonville, Texas, micropolitan area

== See also ==
- Jacksonville (disambiguation)
