= Jackson Inlet =

Inlet in Nunavut, Canada

Jackson Inlet (73°18′N 088°45′W) is a body of water in Nunavut's Qikiqtaaluk Region. It lies east of Lancaster Sound and cuts into Baffin Island's Brodeur Peninsula.

== Mining ==
Nanisivik, a company mining town, is located 120 km (75 mi) to the east.

The inlet and surrounding area has been explored for diamonds and other potential mining resources.
