= Jackson Hole (disambiguation) =

Jackson Hole is a valley in the US State of Wyoming.

Jackson Hole may also refer to:

- Jackson, Wyoming, locally called Jackson Hole
- Jackson Hole Airport, an airport in Jackson Hole valley
- Jackson Hole Mountain Resort, a ski resort in Jackson Hole valley
- Jackson Hole, China, a resort town

== See also ==
- Jackson Hole Economic Symposium
- Jackson's Whole, a fictional planet in the Vorkosigan Saga novels by Lois McMaster Bujold
