= Little Lake Jackson =

Lake in the state of Florida, United States

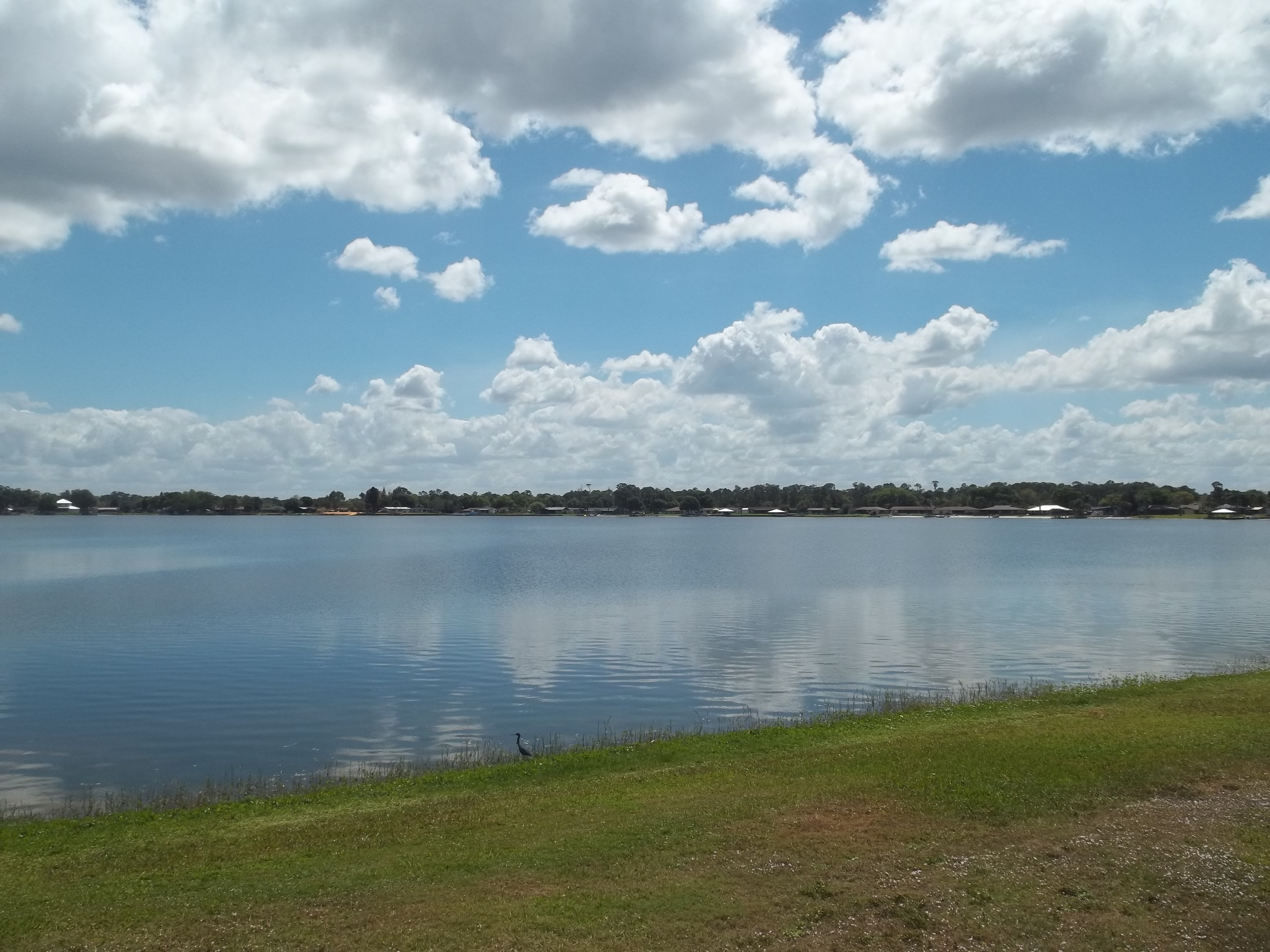

- Location within Florida Location within the United States
- Location: Sebring, Florida
- Coordinates: 27°28′04″N 81°27′49″W
- Basin countries: United States
- Surface area: 137 acres (55 ha)
- Max. depth: 30 ft (9.1 m)

Little Lake Jackson is a 137-acre (0.55 km^{2}) lake, located within the city of Sebring, Florida. It has a maximum depth of 30 feet (9.1 m). On the north side is U.S. Highway 27 and across from that is Lake Jackson.

The lake has no public access directly, although it is connected by a short canal to Lake Jackson, which has a public boat ramp. Activities on the lake include boating and fishing. A golf course overlooks the southwest side and various businesses adjoin it on the north, along US 27. A hotel, Inn on the Lakes, is on its north shore. Historic Harder Hall, partially renovated but abandoned because of the developer's financial problems, is on the northwest shore.

== History ==
In 1928 Harder Hall, a classic Spanish Style hotel and golf resort, was built on the shore of Little Lake Jackson. It was built in Sebring because the city was a stop on the railroad. In 1953 it was bought by Victor and David Jacobson and partners Larry Tennenbaum and Sam Levy. In 1954 Victor commissioned golf course architect Dick Wilson to transform the golf course into a championship layout. Among the major tournaments held at Harder Hall Hotel were the Haig & Haig, a PGA event played by both Arnold Palmer and Jack Nicholas. Other famous guests of the hotel were Paul Newman, Steve Mcqueen, Ali MacGraw and Mario Andretti. With head pro Ben Roman Victor started the first golf school in the world. Victor and Eva Jacobson also operated Harder Hall Golf and Tennis Camp at the hotel between 1967 and 1980. This was the first and last co-ed, teenage golf and tennis camp in a resort hotel ever and drew campers from all over the world. Victor operated this hotel until the 1981 when he sold it. The building has been abandoned ever since. Several renovation projects were started but halted. Several times Harder Hall barely escaped demolition. Currently the building is still unfinished. Harder Hall was purchased at auction by the City of Sebring in late July 2007.
