= Sara Anundsen =

American tennis player (born 1985)

- Full name: Sara Lynn Anundsen
- Country (sports): United States
- Born: June 21, 1985 (age 40) Denver, Colorado, U.S.
- Height: 5 ft 6 in (168 cm)
- Prize money: $5,315

Singles
- Career record: 0–2

Doubles
- Career record: 1–3

Grand Slam doubles results
- US Open: 1R (2007)

Sara Lynn Anundsen (born June 21, 1985) is an American former professional tennis player.

Born in Denver, Anundsen attended Columbine High School and was a three-time Colorado state schools champion from 2001 to 2003, going undefeated (50–0).

Anundsen played collegiate tennis for the University of North Carolina and won the 2007 NCAA doubles championship partnering Jenna Long, which was the first national title for the Tar Heels. This earned the pair a wildcard into the doubles main draw of the 2007 US Open.
