= Jenna Long =

American tennis player (born 1985)

- Country (sports): United States
- Born: November 26, 1985 (age 40) Fremont, California, U.S.
- Height: 5 ft 8 in (173 cm)
- Prize money: $7,210

Singles
- Career record: 4–7

Doubles
- Career record: 6–7
- Career titles: 1 ITF
- Highest ranking: No. 796 (November 26, 2007)

Grand Slam doubles results
- US Open: 1R (2007)

Jenna Long (born November 26, 1985) is an American former professional tennis player. She is now an attorney.

Long grew up in Fremont, California and studied at the University of North Carolina. In her senior year of collegiate tennis, she partnered with Sara Anundsen to win the 2007 NCAA doubles championship.

As the reigning national college champions, Long and Anundsen received a wildcard to compete in the main draw of the 2007 US Open, where they were beaten in the first round of the doubles draw by the Polish pairing of Klaudia Jans and Alicja Rosolska.

== ITF finals ==
=== Doubles (1–1) ===
Result	No.	Date	Tournament	Surface	Partner	Opponents	Score
Loss	1.	July 23, 2006	Wichita, United States	Hard	(United States) Christy Striplin	(United States) Catrina Thompson (United States) Christian Thompson	2–6, 3–6
Win	2.	July 29, 2007	Evansville, United States	Hard	(United States) Anna Lubinsky	(Bosnia and Herzegovina) Helena Bešović (Norway) Nina Munch-Søgaard	6–1, 3–6, 6–2
