= Jackson Correctional Institution (Florida) =

State prison in Malone, Florida

Coordinates: 30°58′07″N 85°10′05″W

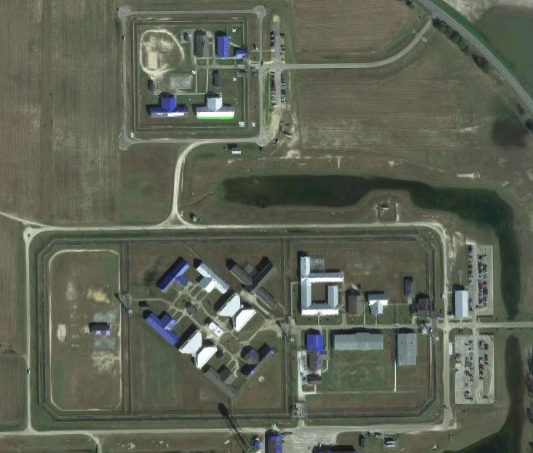
- Overhead view of JACCI
- Interactive map of Jackson Correctional Institution
- Location: 5563 10th Street Malone, Florida
- Status: Operational
- Security class: Minimum, medium, and close
- Capacity: 2,096 = 1,346 (main) + 573 (satellites)
- Population: 1,554 = 1,161 (main) + 393 (satellites) (July 2025)
- Opened: 1991
- Managed by: Florida Department of Corrections
- Warden: Heath Holland

The Jackson Correctional Institution (JACCI) is a state prison for men located in Malone, Jackson County, Florida, owned and operated by the Florida Department of Corrections. This facility has a mix of security levels, including minimum, medium, and close, and houses adult male offenders. Jackson first opened in 1991, has two work camps (Jackson Work Camp and Graceville Work Camp), and has a maximum capacity of 2,096 prisoners.

== History ==
JAACI was estimated to cost about $15 million (equivalent to $36,965,104 in 2025).

== Notable inmates ==
Inmate Name	Register Number	Status	Details
Fidel Lopez	B15765	Serving a life sentence.	Convicted of the 2015 murder of his girlfriend, Maria Nemeth, with the motivation of the killing being she mentioned another man's name during sex.
