= Jacksonville (disambiguation) =

Jacksonville is the largest city in the U.S. state of Florida.

Jacksonville may also refer to:

== Places ==
=== United States ===
- Jacksonville, Alabama
- Jacksonville, Arkansas
- Jacksonville, Florida
- Jacksonville, Georgia, a city in Telfair County
- Jacksonville, Towns County, Georgia
- Jacksonville, Illinois
- Jacksonville, Indiana
- Jacksonville, Iowa
- Jamestown, Kentucky, formerly known as Jacksonville
- Phoenix, Maryland, also known as Jacksonville
- Jacksonville, Missouri, Randolph County
- Jacksonville, Sullivan County, Missouri
- Jacksonville, New Jersey
- Jacksonville, New York
- Jacksonville, North Carolina
- Jacksonville, Adams County, Ohio
- Jacksonville, Ohio, Athens County
- Pickerington, Ohio, originally named Jacksonville
- Jacksonville, Oregon
- Jacksonville, Centre County, Pennsylvania
- Jacksonville, Pennsylvania, Indiana County
- Jacksonville, Lehigh County, Pennsylvania
- Jacksonville, Texas
- Jacksonville, Vermont
- Floyd, Virginia, originally named Jacksonville
- Jacksonville, West Virginia
- Jacksonville, Wisconsin

=== Other ===
- Jacksonville, New Brunswick, Canada see List of New Brunswick provincial highways
- Jacksonville, a former settlement on East Caicos in the Turks and Caicos Islands

== Education ==
- Jacksonville College, a private junior college in Jacksonville, Texas
- Jacksonville State University, a public collegiate level institution in Jacksonville, Alabama
- Jacksonville University, a private collegiate level institution in Jacksonville, Florida
- Jacksonville Theological Seminary, a theological seminary in Jacksonville, Florida

== Music and television ==
- Jacksonville, the working title of the Ryan Adams album released as Jacksonville City Nights
- "Jacksonville", a song by Sufjan Stevens from the album Illinois, 2005
- "Jacksonville", a song by Brandon Flowers from the album Flamingo, 2010
- "Jacksonville" (Fringe), an episode of the television series Fringe
- "Jacksonville" (Space Ghost Coast to Coast), an episode of Space Ghost Coast to Coast

== See also ==
- Jacksonville Dolphins, the athletic program of Jacksonville University
- Jacksonville Jaguars, an American football team based in Jacksonville, Florida
- Jacksonville Jumbo Shrimp, a baseball team based in Jacksonville, Florida
