= List of Atlantic Coast Conference champions =

The Atlantic Coast Conference awards championships in 28 sports—13 men's and 15 women's (women's gymnastics was added for the 2023-24 school year with the addition of Clemson). Nationally, fencing (which was relaunched as an official conference sport in 2014–15 after having been absent since 1980) is a coeducational sport, offering one team title since 1990, while ACC titles are awarded to the men's and women's teams. In all sports except volleyball, champions are determined by a post-season game, tournament, or meet. In football, the teams with the best conference records play in the ACC Championship Game for the conference title. The volleyball title is awarded based on regular-season play.

== Summary ==
Through November 15, 2026

School	Joined ACC	Total	Baseball	Men's Basketball	Women's Basketball	Men's Cross Country	Women's Cross Country	Men's Fencing	Women's Fencing	Field Hockey	Football	Men's Golf	Women's Golf	Women's Gymnastics	Men's Indoor Track	Women's Indoor Track	Men's Lacrosse	Women's Lacrosse	Men's Outdoor Track	Women's Outdoor Track	Rowing	Men's Soccer	Women's Soccer	Softball	Men's Swimming	Women's Swimming	Men's Tennis	Women's Tennis	Women's Volleyball	Wrestling	Total	School
Boston College	2005	3	0	0	0	0	0	0	0	0	0	0	0	—	0	0	—	2	0	0	0	1	0	0	0	0	0	0	0	—	3	Boston College
Cal	2024	2	0	0	0	0	0	—	—	0	0	0	0	0	0	0	—	0	0	0	0	0	0	0	2	0	0	0	0	—	2	Cal
Clemson	1953	146	16	0	2	7	1	1	—	—	22	11	1	1	12	8	—	—	12	8	1	16	0	1	1	4	11	8	2	0	146	Clemson
Duke	1953	154	5	24	10	7	2	3	1	0	8	8	22	0	0	1	10	1	1	3	0	5	0	2	0	0	12	18	11	0	154	Duke
Florida State	1991	109	8	2	0	1	6	—	—	—	16	1	1	—	13	4	—	—	14	6	—	—	11	19	0	1	1	0	5	—	109	Florida State
Georgia Tech	1979	47	10	4	0	0	0	—	—	—	2	19	—	—	0	1	—	—	0	0	—	—	—	5	0	0	0	4	2	0	47	Georgia Tech
Louisville	2014	8	0	0	1	0	0	—	—	0	0	0	0	—	0	0	—	0	0	0	0	1	0	0	1	0	0	0	5	0	8	Louisville
Maryland	1953-2014	200	3	3	10	11	0	1	—	10	9	1	0	0	26	0	26	11	26	0	—	23	0	1	7	1	2	0	5	24	200	Maryland
Miami	2004	12	1	1	0	0	0	—	—	—	0	—	0	—	0	5	—	—	0	4	0	—	0	—	0	0	0	1	0	—	12	Miami
North Carolina	1953	303	13	18	9	10	4	9	1	28	5	12	2	0	4	15	14	9	5	14	0	5	24	1	17	16	25	13	13	17	303	North Carolina
North Carolina State	1953	156	5	11	7	16	31	—	—	—	7	1	0	2	1	0	0	—	8	0	—	1	1	2	33	4	2	2	1	21	156	North Carolina State
Notre Dame	2013	34	0	1	6	3	1	8	10	—	0	0	0	—	0	0	4	0	0	0	0	1	0	—	0	0	0	0	0	0	34	Notre Dame
Pittsburgh	2013	8	0	0	0	0	0	—	—	—	1	0	—	—	0	0	—	—	0	0	0	0	0	—	0	0	0	0	7	0	8	Pittsburgh
South Carolina	1953–1971	4	0	1	—	0	—	—	—	—	1	1	—	—	0	—	—	—	0	—	—	0	—	—	0	—	1	—	—	—	4	South Carolina
Southern Methodist	2024	1	—	0	0	—	0	—	—	—	0	0	0	—	—	0	—	—	—	0	0	1	0	—	0	0	0	0	0	—	1	Southern Methodist
Stanford	2024	7	0	0	0	0	0	0	0	0	0	0	1	1	0	0	—	0	0	0	2	0	1	0	0	0	1	0	1	0	7	Stanford
Syracuse	2013	15	—	0	0	6	0	—	—	1	0	—	—	—	1	0	3	1	0	0	1	2	0	0	—	—	—	0	0	—	15	Syracuse
Virginia	1953	160	4	3	3	5	3	0	—	1	2	1	2	—	0	1	20	5	3	6	22	16	2	1	16	22	15	2	0	5	160	Virginia
Virginia Tech	2004	39	0	1	1	1	0	—	—	—	4	1	0	—	9	6	—	0	4	3	—	0	0	2	1	0	0	0	0	6	39	Virginia Tech
Wake Forest	1953	61	7	4	0	7	1	—	—	4	2	19	8	—	0	0	—	—	0	0	—	4	1	—	0	—	4	0	0	0	61	Wake Forest
		Total	72	73	49	75	50	22	12	44	79	75	37	4	66	40	76	29	73	44	26	75	40	34	78	48	74	48	52	73	Total	

== Baseball ==
The ACC Baseball champion was determined by regular season finish from 1954 until 1972 and in 1979. The ACC Tournament has determined the champion since 1973. All current conference members field baseball teams except SMU and Syracuse. Both schools were without baseball for more than 40 years before joining the ACC—Syracuse, a member since 2013, last sponsored baseball in the 1972 season, and SMU, which joined in 2024, last sponsored baseball in the 1980 season.

Year	Regular season champion	Tournament champion
1954	Clemson	N/A (Note: No tournament; the champion was determined by regular season finish.)
1955	Wake Forest	N/A
1956	Duke	N/A
1957	Duke	N/A
1958	Clemson	N/A
1959	Clemson	N/A
1960	North Carolina	N/A
1961	Duke	N/A
1962	Wake Forest	N/A
1963	Wake Forest	N/A
1964	North Carolina	N/A
1965	Maryland^{†}	N/A
1966	North Carolina	N/A
1967	Clemson	N/A
1968	NC State	N/A
1969	North Carolina	N/A
1970	Maryland^{†}	N/A
1971	Maryland^{†}	N/A
1972	Virginia	N/A
1973	Clemson	NC State
1974	Clemson	NC State
1975	Clemson	NC State
1975	NC State	NC State
1976	Clemson	
1977	Clemson	Wake Forest
1978	Clemson	
1979	Clemson	N/A (Note: No tournament due to conflict with exams; the champion was determined by regular season finish.)
1980	North Carolina	Clemson
1981	Clemson	Clemson
1981	NC State	Clemson
1982	Clemson	North Carolina
1983	North Carolina	
1984	Clemson	North Carolina
1984	North Carolina	North Carolina
1985	Clemson	Georgia Tech
1985	North Carolina	Georgia Tech
1985	Virginia	Georgia Tech
1986	NC State	Georgia Tech
1987	Georgia Tech	
1988	Clemson	Georgia Tech
1989	North Carolina	Clemson
1990	North Carolina	
1991	Clemson	
1992	Clemson	NC State
1993	Georgia Tech	Clemson
1994	Clemson	
1995	Clemson	Florida State
1996	Florida State	Virginia
1997	Georgia Tech	Florida State
1998	Florida State	Wake Forest
1999	Florida State	Wake Forest
2000	Georgia Tech	
2001	Florida State	Wake Forest
2002	Florida State	
2003	Florida State	Georgia Tech
2004	Georgia Tech	Florida State
2005	Georgia Tech	
2006	Clemson	
2007	Florida State	North Carolina
2008	Miami	
2009	Florida State	Virginia
2010	Virginia	Florida State
2011	Virginia	Virginia
2011	Georgia Tech	Virginia
2012	Florida State	Georgia Tech
2013	North Carolina	
2014	Miami	Georgia Tech
2015	Louisville	Florida State
2016	Miami	Clemson
2017	Louisville	Florida State
2018	Clemson	Florida State
2019	Louisville	North Carolina
2020	Cancelled (Note: Not played due to the COVID-19 pandemic)	
2021	Notre Dame	Duke
2022	Virginia Tech	North Carolina
2023	Wake Forest	Clemson
2024	North Carolina	Duke
2025	Georgia Tech	North Carolina
2026	Georgia Tech	

School	Last conference title	Regular season	Tournament	Total
Boston College	never	0	0	0
California	never	0	0	0
Clemson	2023	21	11	32
Duke	2024	3	2	5
Florida State	2018	9	8	17
Georgia Tech	2026	9	10	19
Louisville	2019	3	0	3
Maryland	1971	3	0	3
Miami	2016	3	1	4
North Carolina	2025	13	9	22
NC State	1992	4	4	8
Notre Dame	2021	1	0	1
Pittsburgh	never	0	0	0
South Carolina	never	0	0	0
Stanford	never	0	0	0
Virginia	2011	4	3	7
Virginia Tech	2022	1	0	1
Wake Forest	2023	4	4	8

== Men's basketball ==
All 18 full members sponsor men's basketball.

Year	Regular season champion	Tournament champion
1953–54	Duke	NC State
1954–55	NC State	
1955–56	NC State	NC State
1955–56	North Carolina	NC State
1956–57	North Carolina	
1957–58	Duke	Maryland^{†}
1958–59	NC State	NC State
1958–59	North Carolina	NC State
1959–60	North Carolina	Duke
1959–60	Wake Forest	Duke
1960–61	North Carolina	Wake Forest
1961–62	Wake Forest	
1962–63	Duke	
1963–64	Duke	
1964–65	Duke	NC State
1965–66	Duke	
1966–67	North Carolina	
1967–68	North Carolina	
1968–69	North Carolina	
1969–70	South Carolina^{†}	NC State
1970–71	North Carolina	South Carolina^{†}
1971–72	North Carolina	
1972–73	NC State	
1973–74	NC State	
1974–75	Maryland^{†}	North Carolina
1975–76	North Carolina	Virginia
1976–77	North Carolina	
1977–78	North Carolina	Duke
1978–79	North Carolina	North Carolina
1978–79	Duke	North Carolina
1979–80	Maryland^{†}	Duke
1980–81	Virginia	North Carolina
1981–82	North Carolina	North Carolina
1981–82	Virginia	North Carolina
1982–83	North Carolina	NC State
1982–83	Virginia	NC State
1983–84	North Carolina	Maryland^{†}
1984–85	Georgia Tech	Georgia Tech
1984–85	North Carolina	Georgia Tech
1984–85	NC State	Georgia Tech
1985–86	Duke	
1986–87	North Carolina	NC State
1987–88	North Carolina	Duke
1988–89	NC State	North Carolina
1989–90	Clemson	Georgia Tech
1990–91	Duke	North Carolina
1991–92	Duke	
1992–93	North Carolina	Georgia Tech
1993–94	Duke	North Carolina
1994–95	Wake Forest	Wake Forest
1994–95	North Carolina	Wake Forest
1994–95	Maryland^{†}	Wake Forest
1994–95	Virginia	Wake Forest
1995–96	Georgia Tech	Wake Forest
1996–97	Duke	North Carolina
1997–98	Duke	North Carolina
1998–99	Duke	
1999–00	Duke	
2000–01	North Carolina	Duke
2000–01	Duke	Duke
2001–02	Maryland^{†}	Duke
2002–03	Wake Forest	Duke
2003–04	Duke	Maryland^{†}
2004–05	North Carolina	Duke
2005–06	Duke	
2006–07	North Carolina	North Carolina
2006–07	Virginia	North Carolina
2007–08	North Carolina	
2008–09	North Carolina	Duke
2009–10	Duke	Duke
2009–10	Maryland^{†}	Duke
2010–11	North Carolina	Duke
2011–12	North Carolina	Florida State
2012–13	Miami	
2013–14	Virginia	
2014–15	Virginia	Notre Dame
2015–16	North Carolina	
2016–17	North Carolina	Duke
2017–18	Virginia	
2018–19	Virginia	Duke
2018–19	North Carolina	Duke
2019–20	Florida State	N/A
2020–21	Virginia	Georgia Tech
2021–22	Duke	Virginia Tech
2022–23	Miami	Duke
2023–24	North Carolina	NC State
2024–25	Duke	
2025–26	Duke	

School	Last conference title	Regular season	Tournament	Total
Boston College	never	0	0	0
California	never	0	0	0
Clemson	1989-90	1	0	1
Duke	2025-26	22	24	46
Florida State	2019-20	1	1	2
Georgia Tech	2020-21	2	4	6
Louisville	never	0	0	0
Maryland	2009-10	5	3	8
Miami	2022-23	2	1	3
North Carolina	2023-24	33	18	51
NC State	2023-24	7	11	18
Notre Dame	2014-15	0	1	1
Pittsburgh	never	0	0	0
South Carolina	1970-71	1	1	2
Southern Methodist	never	0	0	0
Stanford	never	0	0	0
Syracuse	never	0	0	0
Virginia	2020-21	10	3	13
Virginia Tech	2021-22	0	1	1
Wake Forest	2002-03	4	4	8

== Women's basketball ==
All full members sponsor women's basketball. The ACC began sponsoring women's basketball in the 1977–78 season.

Year	Regular season champion	Tournament champion
1977–78	NC State	Maryland^{†}
1978–79	Maryland^{†}	
1979–80	NC State	
1980–81	Clemson	Maryland^{†}
1981–82	Maryland^{†}	
1982–83	NC State	Maryland^{†}
1983–84	Virginia	North Carolina
1984–85	NC State	
1985–86	Virginia	Maryland^{†}
1986–87	Virginia	NC State
1987–88	Virginia	Maryland^{†}
1987–88	Maryland^{†}	Maryland^{†}
1988–89	Maryland^{†}	
1989–90	NC State	Virginia
1990–91	Virginia	NC State
1991–92	Virginia	
1992–93	Virginia	
1993–94	Virginia	North Carolina
1994–95	Virginia	North Carolina
1995–96	Virginia	Clemson
1996–97	North Carolina	
1997–98	Duke	North Carolina
1998–99	Duke	Clemson
1999–00	Virginia	Duke
2000–01	Duke	
2001–02	Duke	
2002–03	Duke	
2003–04	Duke	
2004–05	North Carolina	North Carolina
2004–05	Duke	North Carolina
2005–06	North Carolina	
2006–07	Duke	North Carolina
2007–08	North Carolina	
2008–09	Maryland^{†}	Maryland^{†}
2008–09	Florida State	Maryland^{†}
2009–10	Duke	Duke
2009–10	Florida State	Duke
2010–11	Duke	Duke
2010–11	Miami	Duke
2011–12	Duke	Maryland^{†}
2012–13	Duke	
2013–14	Notre Dame	
2014–15	Notre Dame	
2015–16	Notre Dame	
2016–17	Notre Dame	
2017–18	Louisville	Louisville
2017–18	Notre Dame	Louisville
2018–19	Notre Dame	Notre Dame
2018–19	Louisville	Notre Dame
2019–20	Louisville	NC State
2020–21	Louisville	NC State
2021–22	NC State	
2022–23	Notre Dame	Virginia Tech
2023–24	Virginia Tech	Notre Dame
2024–25	Notre Dame	Duke
2024–25	NC State	Duke
2025–26	Duke	

School	Last conference title	Regular season	Tournament	Total
Boston College	never	0	0	0
California	never	0	0	0
Clemson	1998-99	1	2	3
Duke	2025-26	13	10	23
Florida State	2009-10	2	0	2
Georgia Tech	never	0	0	0
Louisville	2020-21	4	1	5
Maryland	2011-12	5	10	15
Miami	2010-11	1	0	1
North Carolina	2007-08	4	9	13
NC State	2024-25	7	7	14
Notre Dame	2024-25	8	6	14
Pittsburgh	never	0	0	0
Southern Methodist	never	0	0	0
Stanford	never	0	0	0
Syracuse	never	0	0	0
Virginia	1999-00	11	3	14
Virginia Tech	2022-23	1	1	1
Wake Forest	never	0	0	0

== Cross country ==
=== Men's ===
The 1953 and 1955 champions were determined based on regular season standings; all others have been determined at a post-season meet. All member schools except SMU sponsor men's cross country.

Year	Champion
1953 (Note: Champion based on dual meet standings of regular season.)	NC State
1954	Maryland^{†}
1955	Maryland^{†}
1956	North Carolina
1957	North Carolina
1958	Duke
1959	Duke
1960	North Carolina
1961	North Carolina
1962	North Carolina
1963	North Carolina
1964	Maryland^{†}
1965	Maryland^{†}
1966	Maryland^{†}
1967	Maryland^{†}
1968	Maryland^{†}
1969	Maryland^{†}
1970	Duke
1971	North Carolina
1972	Maryland^{†}
1973	Duke
1974	Maryland^{†}
1975	Duke
1976	Maryland^{†}
1977	Duke
1978	Clemson
1979	North Carolina
1980	Clemson
1981	Clemson
1982	Clemson
1983	Clemson
1984	Virginia
1985	North Carolina
1986	NC State
1987	Clemson
1988	Clemson
1989	Wake Forest
1990	Wake Forest
1991	NC State
1992	NC State
1993	Wake Forest
1994	Wake Forest
1995	NC State
1996	NC State
1997	NC State
1998	NC State
1999	NC State
2000	Duke
2001	NC State
2002	NC State
2003	NC State
2004	NC State
2005	Virginia
2006	NC State
2007	Virginia
2008	Virginia
2009	NC State
2010	Florida State
2011	NC State
2012	Virginia Tech
2013	Syracuse
2014	Syracuse
2015	Syracuse
2016	Syracuse
2017	Syracuse
2018	Notre Dame
2019	Syracuse
2020	Notre Dame
2021	Notre Dame
2022	Wake Forest
2023	North Carolina
2024	Wake Forest
2025	Virginia
2026	Wake Forest

School	Last conference title	Number of ACC titles
Boston College	never	0
California	never	0
Clemson	1988	7
Duke	2000	7
Florida State	2010	1
Georgia Tech	never	0
Louisville	never	0
Maryland	1976	11
Miami	never	0
North Carolina	2023	10
NC State	2011	16
Notre Dame	2021	3
Pittsburgh	never	0
Stanford	never	0
Syracuse	2019	6
Virginia	2025	5
Virginia Tech	2012	1
Wake Forest	2026	7

=== Women's ===
All member schools sponsor women's cross country.

Year	Champion
1978	NC State
1979	NC State
1980	NC State
1981	Virginia
1982	Virginia
1983	NC State
1984	NC State
1985	NC State
1986	Clemson
1987	NC State
1988	NC State
1989	NC State
1990	NC State
1991	NC State
1992	NC State
1993	NC State
1994	North Carolina
1995	NC State
1996	NC State
1997	NC State
1998	NC State
1999	North Carolina
2000	NC State
2001	NC State
2002	NC State
2002	Wake Forest
2003	North Carolina
2004	Duke
2005	Duke
2006	NC State
2007	vacated (Note: Florida State's 2007 season was vacated by the NCAA's Committee on Infractions.)
2008	Florida State
2009	Florida State
2010	Florida State
2011	Florida State
2012	Florida State
2013	Florida State
2014	North Carolina
2015	Virginia
2016	NC State
2017	NC State
2018	NC State
2019	NC State
2020	NC State
2021	NC State
2022	NC State
2023	NC State
2024	Notre Dame
2025	NC State
2026	NC State

School	Last conference title	Number of ACC titles
Boston College	never	0
California	never	0
Clemson	1986	1
Duke	2005	2
Florida State	2013	6
Georgia Tech	never	0
Louisville	never	0
Maryland	never	0
Miami	never	0
North Carolina	2014	4
NC State	2026	31
Notre Dame	2024	1
Pittsburgh	never	0
Southern Methodist	never	0
Stanford	never	0
Syracuse	never	0
Virginia	2015	3
Virginia Tech	never	0
Wake Forest	2002	1

== Fencing ==
Four schools—Boston College, Duke, North Carolina, and Notre Dame—relaunched ACC fencing in the 2014–15 school year after the sport had been absent from the conference since 1980. Stanford, which joins in 2024–25, also sponsors the sport. Fencing was a men's sport during the first era of ACC fencing from 1971 to 1980. Today, ACC fencing is a coeducational sport, with teams fielding separate men's and women's squads and all bouts involving a single sex. Although the NCAA Fencing Championships award only a single team title, the ACC Fencing Championships award separate men's and women's team titles.

Year	Men's champion	Women's champion
1971	North Carolina	—
1972	North Carolina	—
1973	North Carolina	—
1974	North Carolina	—
1975	North Carolina	—
1976	North Carolina	—
1977	North Carolina	—
1978	Maryland^{†}	—
1979	Clemson	—
1980	North Carolina	—
2015	Notre Dame	Notre Dame
2016	Notre Dame	Notre Dame
2017	Notre Dame	Notre Dame
2018	Duke	North Carolina
2019	Notre Dame	Notre Dame
2020	Notre Dame	Notre Dame
2021	Duke	Duke
2022	Notre Dame	Notre Dame
2023	Notre Dame	Notre Dame
2024	North Carolina	Notre Dame
2025	Notre Dame	Notre Dame
2026	Duke	Notre Dame

School	Last conference title	Number of ACC titles
Boston College	never	0
Duke	2026	3
Clemson	1979	1 (Note: Clemson and Virginia sponsored fencing in the 1971–80 period, but no longer do so.)
Maryland	1978	1
North Carolina	2024	10
Notre Dame	2026	18
Stanford	never	0
Virginia	never	0

== Field hockey ==
Nine schools—Boston College, California, Duke, Louisville, North Carolina, Stanford, Syracuse, Virginia, and Wake Forest—will sponsor women's field hockey in the upcoming 2024 season.

Year	Champion
1983	North Carolina
1984	North Carolina
1985	North Carolina
1986	North Carolina
1987	North Carolina
1988	North Carolina
1989	North Carolina
1990	North Carolina
1991	North Carolina
1992	Maryland^{†}
1993	North Carolina
1994	North Carolina
1995	North Carolina
1996	North Carolina
1997	North Carolina
1998	Maryland^{†}
1999	Maryland^{†}
2000	Maryland^{†}
2001	Maryland^{†}
2002	Wake Forest
2003	Wake Forest
2004	North Carolina
2005	Maryland^{†}
2006	Wake Forest
2007	North Carolina
2008	Maryland^{†}
2009	Maryland^{†}
2010	Maryland^{†}
2011	North Carolina
2012	North Carolina
2013	Maryland^{†}
2014	Wake Forest
2015	North Carolina
2016	Virginia
2017	North Carolina
2018	North Carolina
2019	North Carolina
2020	North Carolina
2021	North Carolina
2022	North Carolina
2023	North Carolina
2024	North Carolina
2025	North Carolina
2026	Syracuse

School	Last conference title	Number of ACC titles
Boston College	never	0
California	never	0
Duke	never	0
Louisville	never	0
Maryland	2013	10
North Carolina	2025	28
Stanford	never	0
Syracuse	2026	1
Virginia	2016	1
Wake Forest	2014	4

== Football ==
The ACC football champion was determined based on regular season finish from 1953 until 2004. In 2005, the conference split into two divisions, and the division winners met in the ACC Championship Game through the 2022 season. The football divisions were eliminated in 2020 and after the 2022 season. Notre Dame has never been an ACC member in football, except for the 2020 season on a temporary basis due to the COVID-19 pandemic; that season, they played in (but lost) the football conference championship. They have otherwise remained independent but have a yearly 5-game scheduling agreement with the ACC.

Year	Champion
1953	Duke
1953	Maryland^{†}
1954	Duke
1955	Duke
1955	Maryland^{†}
1956	Clemson
1957	NC State
1958	Clemson
1959	Clemson
1960	Duke
1961	Duke
1962	Duke
1963	North Carolina
1963	NC State
1964	NC State
1965	Clemson*
1965	NC State*
1966	Clemson
1967	Clemson
1968	NC State
1969	South Carolina^{†}
1970	Wake Forest
1971	North Carolina
1972	North Carolina
1973	NC State
1974	Maryland^{†}
1975	Maryland^{†}
1976	Maryland^{†}
1977	North Carolina
1978	Clemson
1979	NC State
1980	North Carolina
1981	Clemson
1982	Clemson
1983	Maryland^{†}
1984	Maryland^{†}
1985	Maryland^{†}
1986	Clemson
1987	Clemson
1988	Clemson
1989	Duke
1989	Virginia
1990	Georgia Tech
1991	Clemson
1992	Florida State
1993	Florida State
1994	Florida State
1995	Florida State
1995	Virginia
1996	Florida State
1997	Florida State
1998	Florida State
1998	Georgia Tech
1999	Florida State
2000	Florida State
2001	Maryland^{†}
2002	Florida State
2003	Florida State
2004	Virginia Tech
2005	Florida State
2006	Wake Forest
2007	Virginia Tech
2008	Virginia Tech
2009	vacated (Note: Georgia Tech's 2009 championship was vacated by the NCAA Committee on Infractions)
2010	Virginia Tech
2011	Clemson
2012	Florida State
2013	Florida State
2014	Florida State
2015	Clemson
2016	Clemson
2017	Clemson
2018	Clemson
2019	Clemson
2020	Clemson
2021	Pittsburgh
2022	Clemson
2023	Florida State
2024	Clemson
2025	Duke

School	Last conference title	Number of ACC titles
Boston College	never	0
California	never	0
Clemson	2024	22
Duke	2025	8
Florida State	2023	15
Georgia Tech	1998	2
Louisville	never	0
Maryland	2001	9
Miami	never	0
North Carolina	1980	5
NC State	1979	7
Pittsburgh	2021	1
South Carolina	1969	1
Southern Methodist	never	0
Stanford	never	0
Syracuse	never	0
Virginia	1995	2
Virginia Tech	2010	4
Wake Forest	2006	2

== Golf ==
=== Men's ===
All schools except Miami, Pittsburgh, and Syracuse sponsor men's golf.

Year	Champion
1954	Duke
1955	Wake Forest
1956	North Carolina
1957	Wake Forest
1958	Wake Forest
1959	Duke
1960	North Carolina
1961	Duke
1962	Duke
1963	Wake Forest
1964	South Carolina^{†}
1964	Maryland^{†}
1965	North Carolina
1966	Duke
1967	Wake Forest
1968	Wake Forest
1969	Wake Forest
1970	Wake Forest
1971	Wake Forest
1972	Wake Forest
1973	Wake Forest
1974	Wake Forest
1975	Wake Forest
1976	Wake Forest
1977	North Carolina
1978	Wake Forest
1979	Wake Forest
1980	Wake Forest
1981	North Carolina
1982	Clemson
1983	North Carolina
1984	North Carolina
1985	Georgia Tech
1986	North Carolina
1987	Clemson
1988	Clemson
1989	Wake Forest
1990	Clemson
1990	NC State
1991	Georgia Tech
1992	Georgia Tech
1993	Georgia Tech
1994	Georgia Tech
1995	North Carolina
1996	North Carolina
1997	Clemson
1998	Clemson
1999	Georgia Tech
2000	Clemson
2001	Georgia Tech
2002	Georgia Tech
2003	Clemson
2004	Clemson
2005	Duke
2006	Georgia Tech
2006	North Carolina
2007	Georgia Tech
2007	Virginia Tech
2008	Florida State
2009	Georgia Tech
2010	Georgia Tech
2011	Georgia Tech
2012	Georgia Tech
2013	Duke
2014	Georgia Tech
2015	Georgia Tech
2016	Clemson
2017	Duke
2018	Georgia Tech
2019	Georgia Tech
2020	Cancelled
2021	Clemson
2022	Wake Forest
2023	Georgia Tech
2024	North Carolina
2025	Virginia

School	Last conference title	Number of ACC titles
Boston College	never	0
California	never	0
Clemson	2021	11
Duke	2017	8
Florida State	2008	1
Georgia Tech	2023	19
Louisville	never	0
Maryland	1964	1
North Carolina	2024	12
NC State	1990	1
Notre Dame	never	0
South Carolina	1964	1
Southern Methodist	never	0
Stanford	never	0
Virginia	2025	1
Virginia Tech	2007	1
Wake Forest	2022	19

=== Women's ===
All schools except Georgia Tech, Pittsburgh, and Syracuse sponsor women's golf. The most recent additions to ACC women's golf are California, SMU, and Stanford, all of which joined the ACC in 2024–25.

Year	Champion
1984	Duke
1985	Duke
1986	Wake Forest
1987	Not held
1988	Not held
1989	Not held
1990	Not held
1991	Not held
1992	North Carolina
1993	Duke
1994	Wake Forest
1995	Wake Forest
1996	Duke
1997	Duke
1998	Duke
1999	Duke
2000	Duke
2001	Duke
2002	Duke
2003	Duke
2004	Duke
2005	Duke
2006	Duke
2007	Duke
2008	Duke
2009	Wake Forest
2010	Wake Forest
2011	North Carolina
2012	Duke
2013	Duke
2014	Duke
2015	Virginia
2016	Virginia
2017	Duke
2018	Duke
2019	Wake Forest
2020	Cancelled
2021	Duke
2022	Wake Forest
2023	Clemson
2024	Wake Forest
2025	Florida State
2026	Stanford

School	Last conference title	Number of ACC titles
Boston College	never	0
California	never	0
Clemson	2023	1
Duke	2021	22
Florida State	2025	1
Louisville	never	0
Maryland	never	0
Miami	never	0
North Carolina	2011	2
NC State	never	0
Notre Dame	never	0
Southern Methodist	never	0
Stanford	2026	1
Virginia	2016	2
Virginia Tech	never	0
Wake Forest	2024	8

== Gymnastics ==
=== Women's ===
The ACC sponsored women's gymnastics for one season, 1984. Duke discontinued their program following the season, and the conference stopped sponsoring the sport until renewing the competition in the 2024 season. The conference initially planned to resume sponsoring gymnastics once Pittsburgh joined in 2013–14, but backed away from those plans once Maryland announced its 2014 departure for the Big Ten.

The ACC women's gymnastics league expanded from 4 to 6 teams in 2024–25 with the arrival of California and Stanford.

Year	Champion
1984	NC State
2024	NC State
2025	Stanford
2026	Clemson

School	Last conference title	Number of ACC titles
California	never	0
Clemson	2026	1
Duke	never	0
Maryland	never	0
North Carolina	never	0
NC State	2024	2
Pittsburgh	never	0
Stanford	2025	1

== Lacrosse ==
=== Men's ===
Champions were determined through regular-season standings until 1988, after which time an ACC Lacrosse Championship tournament was held to determine the conference champion (with exceptions being in the 2021 and 2022 seasons, which again used conference standings). Five schools—Duke, North Carolina, Notre Dame, Syracuse, and Virginia—sponsor men's lacrosse with the most recent additions being Notre Dame and Syracuse, both added in the 2014 season (2013-14 school year). Former ACC school Maryland moved to the Big Ten Conference in 2015. North Carolina State sponsored men's lacrosse from 1973 to 1982.

Year	Champion
1954	Duke
1955	Maryland^{†}
1956	Maryland^{†}
1957	Maryland^{†}
1958	Maryland^{†}
1959	Maryland^{†}
1960	Maryland^{†}
1961	Maryland^{†}
1962	Virginia
1963	Maryland^{†}
1964	Virginia
1965	Maryland^{†}
1966	Maryland^{†}
1967	Maryland^{†}
1968	Maryland^{†}
1969	Virginia
1970	Virginia
1971	Virginia
1972	Maryland^{†}
1973	Maryland^{†}
1974	Maryland^{†}
1975	Virginia
1976	Maryland^{†}
1977	Maryland^{†}
1978	Maryland^{†}
1979	Maryland^{†}
1980	Maryland^{†}
1980	Virginia
1981	North Carolina
1982	North Carolina
1983	Virginia
1984	Virginia
1985	Maryland^{†}
1985	North Carolina
1985	Virginia
1986	Virginia
1987	Maryland^{†}
1988	North Carolina
1989	North Carolina
1990	North Carolina
1991	North Carolina
1992	North Carolina
1993	North Carolina
1994	North Carolina
1995	Duke
1996	North Carolina
1997	Virginia
1998	Maryland^{†}
1999	Virginia
2000	Virginia
2001	Duke
2002	Duke
2003	Virginia
2004	Maryland^{†}
2005	Maryland^{†}
2006	Virginia
2007	Duke
2008	Duke
2009	Duke
2010	Virginia
2011	Maryland^{†}
2012	Duke
2013	North Carolina
2014	Notre Dame
2015	Syracuse
2016	Syracuse
2017	North Carolina
2018	Notre Dame
2019	Virginia
2020	Not held
2021	Duke
2021	North Carolina
2022	Notre Dame
2022	Virginia
2023	Duke
2024	Notre Dame
2025	Syracuse
2026	Virginia

School	Last conference title	Number of ACC titles
Duke	2023	10
Maryland (Note: Maryland was in the ACC before joining the Big Ten in 2015.)	2011	26
North Carolina	2021	14
NC State (Note: NC State sponsored men's lacrosse from 1973-82.)	never	0
Notre Dame	2024	4
Syracuse	2025	3
Virginia	2026	20

=== Women's ===
Ten of the eighteen schools—Boston College, California, Duke, Louisville, North Carolina, Notre Dame, Stanford, Syracuse, Virginia, and Virginia Tech—sponsor women's lacrosse. Maryland left the ACC in 2015 to join the Big Ten Conference.

Year	Champion
1997	Maryland^{†}
1998	Virginia
1999	Maryland^{†}
2000	Maryland^{†}
2001	Maryland^{†}
2002	North Carolina
2003	Maryland^{†}
2004	Virginia
2005	Duke
2006	Virginia
2007	Virginia
2008	Virginia
2009	Maryland^{†}
2010	Maryland^{†}
2011	Maryland^{†}
2012	Maryland^{†}
2013	Maryland^{†}
2014	Maryland^{†}
2015	Syracuse
2016	North Carolina
2017	North Carolina
2018	North Carolina
2019	North Carolina
2020	Not held
2021	North Carolina
2022	North Carolina
2023	Boston College
2024	Boston College
2025	North Carolina
2026	North Carolina

School	Last conference title	Number of ACC titles
Boston College	2024	2
California	never	0
Duke	2005	1
Louisville	never	0
Maryland	2014	11
North Carolina	2026	9
Notre Dame	never	0
Stanford	never	0
Syracuse	2015	1
Virginia	2008	5
Virginia Tech	never	0

== Indoor track and field ==
=== Men's ===
No indoor championships were held between 1981 and 1986. All schools sponsor men's indoor track & field except SMU.

Year	Champion
1953–54	Maryland^{†}
1954–55	North Carolina
1955–56	Maryland^{†}
1956–57	Maryland^{†}
1957–58	Maryland^{†}
1958–59	Maryland^{†}
1959–60	Maryland^{†}
1960–61	Maryland^{†}
1961–62	Maryland^{†}
1962–63	Maryland^{†}
1963–64	Maryland^{†}
1964–65	Maryland^{†}
1965–66	Maryland^{†}
1966–67	Maryland^{†}
1967–68	Maryland^{†}
1968–69	Maryland^{†}
1969–70	Maryland^{†}
1970–71	Maryland^{†}
1971–72	Maryland^{†}
1972–73	Maryland^{†}
1973–74	Maryland^{†}
1974–75	Maryland^{†}
1975–76	Maryland^{†}
1976–77	Maryland^{†}
1977–78	Maryland^{†}
1978–79	Maryland^{†}
1979–80	Maryland^{†}
1980–81	Not held
1981–82	Not held
1982–83	Not held
1983–84	Not held
1984–85	Not held
1985–86	Not held
1986–87	Clemson
1987–88	NC State
1988–89	Clemson
1989–90	Clemson
1990–91	Clemson
1991–92	Clemson
1992–93	Clemson
1993–94	Florida State
1994–95	North Carolina
1995–96	North Carolina
1996–97	Clemson
1997–98	Clemson
1998–99	Clemson
1999–00	Clemson
2000–01	Clemson
2001–02	Clemson
2002–03	Florida State
2003–04	Florida State
2004–05	Florida State
2005–06	Florida State
2006–07	vacated (Note: Florida State's 2006–2007 season was vacated by the NCAA Committee on Infractions.)
2007–08	Florida State
2008–09	Florida State
2009–10	Florida State
2010–11	Virginia Tech
2011–12	Florida State
2012–13	Virginia Tech
2013–14	Florida State
2014–15	Virginia Tech
2015–16	Syracuse
2016–17	Virginia Tech
2017–18	Florida State
2018–19	Florida State
2018–19	Virginia Tech
2019–20	Florida State
2020–21	Virginia Tech
2021–22	Virginia Tech
2022–23	Virginia Tech
2023–24	North Carolina
2024–25	Virginia Tech
2025–26	Florida State

School	Last conference title	Number of ACC titles
Boston College	never	0
California	never	0
Clemson	2002	12
Duke	never	0
Florida State	2026	14
Georgia Tech	never	0
Louisville	never	0
Maryland	1980	26
Miami	never	0
North Carolina	2024	4
NC State	1988	1
Notre Dame	never	0
Pittsburgh	never	0
South Carolina	never	0
Stanford	never	0
Syracuse	2016	1
Virginia	never	0
Virginia Tech	2025	9
Wake Forest	never	0

=== Women's ===
All members sponsor women's Indoor Track

Year	Champion
1986–87	Virginia
1987–88	North Carolina
1988–89	North Carolina
1989–90	North Carolina
1990–91	North Carolina
1991–92	North Carolina
1992–93	Clemson
1993–94	North Carolina
1994–95	North Carolina
1995–96	North Carolina
1996–97	North Carolina
1997–98	North Carolina
1998–99	North Carolina
1999–00	North Carolina
2000–01	North Carolina
2001–02	Georgia Tech
2002–03	North Carolina
2003–04	North Carolina
2004–05	Miami
2005–06	Miami
2006–07	Virginia Tech
2007–08	Virginia Tech
2008–09	Florida State
2009–10	Clemson
2010–11	Clemson
2011–12	Clemson
2012–13	Clemson
2013–14	Florida State
2014–15	Clemson
2015–16	Miami
2016–17	Miami
2017–18	Florida State
2018–19	Miami
2019–20	Virginia Tech
2020–21	Florida State
2021–22	Duke
2021–22	Virginia Tech
2022–23	Virginia Tech
2023–24	Virginia Tech
2024–25	Clemson
2025–26	Clemson

School	Last conference title	Number of ACC titles
Boston College	never	0
California	never	0
Clemson	2026	8
Duke	2022	1
Florida State	2021	4
Georgia Tech	2002	1
Louisville	never	0
Maryland	never	0
Miami	2019	5
North Carolina	2004	15
NC State	never	0
Notre Dame	never	0
Pittsburgh	never	0
Southern Methodist	never	0
Stanford	never	0
Syracuse	never	0
Virginia	1987	1
Virginia Tech	2024	6
Wake Forest	never	0

== Outdoor track and field ==
=== Men's ===
All members sponsor men's outdoor track and field except SMU.

Year	Champion
1954	Maryland^{†}
1955	North Carolina
1956	Maryland^{†}
1957	Maryland^{†}
1958	Maryland^{†}
1959	Maryland^{†}
1960	Maryland^{†}
1961	Maryland^{†}
1962	Maryland^{†}
1963	Maryland^{†}
1964	Maryland^{†}
1965	Maryland^{†}
1966	Maryland^{†}
1967	Maryland^{†}
1968	Maryland^{†}
1969	Maryland^{†}
1970	Maryland^{†}
1971	Maryland^{†}
1972	Maryland^{†}
1973	Maryland^{†}
1974	Maryland^{†}
1975	Maryland^{†}
1976	Maryland^{†}
1977	Maryland^{†}
1978	Maryland^{†}
1979	Maryland^{†}
1980	Clemson
1981	Maryland^{†}
1982	Clemson
1982	NC State
1983	NC State
1984	NC State
1985	NC State
1986	NC State
1987	NC State
1988	NC State
1989	Clemson
1990	Clemson
1991	Clemson
1992	North Carolina
1993	Clemson
1994	North Carolina
1995	North Carolina
1996	NC State
1997	Clemson
1998	Clemson
1999	North Carolina
2000	Clemson
2001	Clemson
2002	Florida State
2003	Florida State
2004	Clemson
2005	Florida State
2006	Florida State
2007	vacated (Note: Florida State's 2007 season was vacated by the NCAA's Committee on Infractions.)
2008	Florida State
2009	Florida State
2009	Virginia
2010	Florida State
2011	Florida State
2012	Virginia Tech
2013	Florida State
2014	Florida State
2015	Florida State
2016	Virginia Tech
2017	Virginia Tech
2018	Florida State
2019	Virginia Tech
2020	Not held
2021	Florida State
2022	Florida State
2023	Clemson
2024	Virginia
2025	Duke
2026	Virginia

School	Last conference title	Number of ACC titles
Boston College	never	0
California	never	0
Clemson	2023	12
Duke	2025	1
Florida State	2022	14
Georgia Tech	never	0
Louisville	never	0
Maryland	1981	26
Miami	never	0
North Carolina	1999	5
NC State	1996	8
Notre Dame	never	0
Pittsburgh	never	0
Stanford	never	0
Syracuse	never	0
Virginia	2026	3
Virginia Tech	2019	4
Wake Forest	never	0

=== Women's ===
All members sponsor women's outdoor track and field.

Year	Champion
1983	Virginia
1984	Virginia
1985	Virginia
1986	Virginia
1987	Virginia
1988	North Carolina
1989	North Carolina
1990	North Carolina
1991	Clemson
1992	North Carolina
1993	North Carolina
1994	North Carolina
1995	North Carolina
1996	North Carolina
1997	North Carolina
1998	North Carolina
1999	Clemson
2000	Florida State
2001	North Carolina
2002	North Carolina
2003	North Carolina
2004	North Carolina
2005	Miami
2006	Miami
2007	Virginia Tech
2008	Virginia Tech
2009	Florida State
2010	Clemson
2011	Clemson
2012	Clemson
2013	Clemson
2014	Florida State
2015	Clemson
2016	Florida State
2017	Virginia Tech
2018	Miami
2019	Florida State
2020	Not held
2021	Duke
2021	Florida State
2022	Miami
2023	Duke
2024	Duke
2025	Virginia
2026	Clemson

School	Last conference title	Number of ACC titles
Boston College	never	0
California	never	0
Clemson	2026	8
Duke	2024	3
Florida State	2021	6
Georgia Tech	never	0
Louisville	never	0
Maryland	never	0
Miami	2022	4
North Carolina	2004	14
NC State	never	0
Notre Dame	never	0
Pittsburgh	never	0
Southern Methodist	never	0
Stanford	never	0
Syracuse	never	0
Virginia	2025	6
Virginia Tech	2017	3
Wake Forest	never	0

== Rowing ==
Florida State, Georgia Tech, NC State, Pitt, Virginia Tech, and Wake Forest do not sponsor women's rowing.

Year	Champion
2000	Virginia
2001	Virginia
2002	Virginia
2003	Virginia
2004	Virginia
2005	Virginia
2006	Virginia
2007	Virginia
2008	Virginia
2009	Clemson
2010	Virginia
2011	Virginia
2012	Virginia
2013	Virginia
2014	Virginia
2015	Virginia
2016	Virginia
2017	Virginia
2018	Virginia
2019	Virginia
2020	Cancelled
2021	Virginia
2022	Virginia
2023	Virginia
2024	Syracuse
2025	Stanford
2026	Stanford

School	Last conference title	Number of ACC titles
Boston College	never	0
California	never	0
Clemson	2009	1
Duke	never	0
Louisville	never	0
Miami	never	0
North Carolina	never	0
Notre Dame	never	0
Southern Methodist	never	0
Stanford	2026	2
Syracuse	2024	1
Virginia	2023	22

== Soccer ==
=== Men's ===
From 1953-1986 the conference champion was determined by regular season play.

Three ACC members, Florida State, Georgia Tech, and Miami, do not sponsor men's soccer.

Year	Champion
1953	Maryland^{†}
1954	Maryland^{†}
1955	Maryland^{†}
1956	Maryland^{†}
1957	Maryland^{†}
1958	Maryland^{†}
1959	Maryland^{†}
1960	Maryland^{†}
1961	Maryland^{†}
1962	Maryland^{†}
1963	Maryland^{†}
1964	Maryland^{†}
1965	Maryland^{†}
1966	Maryland^{†}
1966	North Carolina
1967	Maryland^{†}
1968	Maryland^{†}
1969	Virginia
1970	Virginia
1971	Maryland^{†}
1972	Clemson
1973	Clemson
1974	Clemson
1975	Clemson
1976	Clemson
1977	Clemson
1978	Clemson
1979	Clemson
1980	Duke
1981	Clemson
1982	Clemson
1982	Duke
1983	Virginia
1984	Virginia
1985	Clemson
1986	Virginia
1987	North Carolina
1988	Virginia
1989	Wake Forest
1990	NC State
1991	Virginia
1992	Virginia
1993	Virginia
1994	Virginia
1995	Virginia
1996	Maryland^{†}
1997	Virginia
1998	Clemson
1999	Duke
2000	North Carolina
2001	Clemson
2002	Maryland^{†}
2003	Virginia
2004	Virginia
2005	Duke
2006	Duke
2007	Boston College
2008	Maryland^{†}
2009	Virginia
2010	Maryland^{†}
2011	North Carolina
2012	Maryland^{†}
2013	Maryland^{†}
2014	Clemson
2015	Syracuse
2016	Wake Forest
2017	Wake Forest
2018	Louisville
2019	Virginia
2020	Clemson
2021	Notre Dame
2022	Syracuse
2023	Clemson
2024	Wake Forest
2025	Southern Methodist
2026	North Carolina

School	Last conference title	Number of ACC titles
Boston College	2007	1
California	never	0
Clemson	2023	16
Duke	2006	5
Louisville	2018	1
Maryland	2013	23
North Carolina	2026	5
NC State	1990	1
Notre Dame	2021	1
Pittsburgh	never	0
South Carolina	never	0
Southern Methodist	2025	1
Stanford	never	0
Syracuse	2022	2
Virginia	2019	16
Virginia Tech	never	0
Wake Forest	2024	4

=== Women's ===
In 1987 the conference champion was determined by regular season play.

Georgia Tech does not sponsor women's soccer.

Year	Champion
1987	North Carolina
1988	NC State
1989	North Carolina
1990	North Carolina
1991	North Carolina
1992	North Carolina
1993	North Carolina
1994	North Carolina
1995	North Carolina
1996	North Carolina
1997	North Carolina
1998	North Carolina
1999	North Carolina
2000	North Carolina
2001	North Carolina
2002	North Carolina
2003	North Carolina
2004	Virginia
2005	North Carolina
2006	North Carolina
2007	North Carolina
2008	North Carolina
2009	North Carolina
2010	Wake Forest
2011	Florida State
2012	Virginia
2013	Florida State
2014	Florida State
2015	Florida State
2016	Florida State
2017	North Carolina
2018	Florida State
2019	North Carolina
2020	Florida State
2021	Florida State
2022	Florida State
2023	Florida State
2024	Florida State
2025	Stanford
2026	North Carolina

School	Last conference title	Number of ACC titles
Boston College	never	0
California	never	0
Clemson	never	0
Duke	never	0
Florida State	2024	11
Louisville	never	0
Maryland	never	0
Miami	never	0
North Carolina	2026	24
NC State	1988	1
Notre Dame	never	0
Pittsburgh	never	0
Southern Methodist	never	0
Stanford	2025	1
Syracuse	never	0
Virginia	2012	2
Virginia Tech	never	0
Wake Forest	2010	1

== Softball ==
All schools except Miami, SMU, and Wake Forest sponsor softball. The most recent change to ACC softball membership was the addition of California and Stanford for the 2025 season and beyond.

All information taken from Atlantic Coast Conference softball tournament.

Year	Champion
1992	Florida State
1993	Florida State
1994	Virginia
1995	Florida State
1996	Florida State
1997	Florida State
1997	Maryland
1998	Florida State
1999	Florida State
2000	Florida State
2001	North Carolina
2002	Georgia Tech
2003	Florida State
2004	Florida State
2005	Georgia Tech
2006	NC State
2007	Virginia Tech
2008	Virginia Tech
2009	Georgia Tech
2010	Georgia Tech
2011	Florida State
2012	Georgia Tech
2013	NC State
2014	Florida State
2015	Florida State
2016	Florida State
2017	Florida State
2018	Florida State
2019	Florida State
2020	Cancelled
2021	Duke
2022	Florida State
2023	Florida State
2024	Duke
2025	Clemson

School	Last conference title	Number of ACC titles
Boston College	never	0
California	never	0
Clemson	2025	1
Duke	2024	2
Florida State	2023	19
Georgia Tech	2012	5
Louisville	never	0
North Carolina	2001	1
NC State	2013	2
Notre Dame	never	0
Pittsburgh	never	0
Stanford	never	0
Syracuse	never	0
Virginia	1994	1
Virginia Tech	2008	2

== Swimming and diving ==
=== Men's ===
From 1954 until 1961, the champion was determined by regular season competition. From 1962 to 1964, the champion was determined by a combination of the regular-season finish and placement in the championship meet. Starting with the 1965 season, the champion has been determined by the championship meet. Fourteen of the 18 member institutions compete in men's swimming and diving. Miami currently competes in diving only, and Clemson, Syracuse, and Wake Forest do not compete in swimming or diving.

Year	Champion
1953–54	NC State
1954–55	NC State
1955-56	North Carolina
1955-56	NC State
1956–57	North Carolina
1957–58	North Carolina
1958–59	North Carolina
1959–60	Maryland^{†}
1960-61	Maryland^{†}
1960-61	North Carolina
1960-61	NC State
1961–62	Maryland^{†}
1962–63	Maryland^{†}
1962–63	North Carolina
1962–63	NC State
1963–64	Maryland^{†}
1963–64	North Carolina
1964–65	Maryland^{†}
1965–66	NC State
1966–67	NC State
1967–68	NC State
1968–69	NC State
1969–70	Maryland^{†}
1970–71	NC State
1971–72	NC State
1972–73	NC State
1973–74	NC State
1974–75	NC State
1975–76	NC State
1976–77	NC State
1977–78	NC State
1978–79	NC State
1979–80	NC State
1980–81	NC State
1981–82	NC State
1982–83	North Carolina
1983–84	NC State
1984–85	NC State
1985–86	Clemson
1986–87	Virginia
1987–88	North Carolina
1988–89	North Carolina
1989–90	Virginia
1990–91	North Carolina
1991–92	NC State
1992–93	North Carolina
1993–94	North Carolina
1994–95	North Carolina
1995–96	North Carolina
1996–97	North Carolina
1997–98	North Carolina
1998–99	Virginia
1999–00	Virginia
2000–01	Virginia
2001–02	Virginia
2002–03	Virginia
2003–04	Virginia
2004–05	Virginia
2005–06	Virginia
2006–07	vacated (Note: Florida State's 2006–2007 season was vacated by the NCAA Committee on Infractions.)
2007–08	Virginia
2008–09	Virginia
2009–10	Virginia
2010–11	Virginia
2011–12	Virginia
2012–13	Virginia
2013–14	Virginia Tech
2014-15	NC State
2015–16	NC State
2016–17	NC State
2017–18	NC State
2018–19	NC State
2019–20	NC State
2020–21	Louisville
2021–22	NC State
2022–23	NC State
2023–24	NC State
2024–25	California
2025–26	California

School	Last conference title	Number of ACC titles
Boston College	never	0
California	2026	2
Clemson	1986	1
Duke	never	0
Florida State	never	0
Georgia Tech	never	0
Louisville	2021	1
Maryland	1970	7 (Note: Maryland dropped men's and women's swimming and diving in 2012, two years before it left for the Big Ten.)
Miami	never	0
North Carolina	1998	17
NC State	2024	33
Notre Dame	never	0
Pittsburgh	never	0
South Carolina	never	0
Southern Methodist	never	0
Stanford	never	0
Virginia	2013	16
Virginia Tech	2014	1
Wake Forest	never	0 (Note: Wake Forest has dropped men's swimming and diving.)

=== Women's ===
Fifteen of the 18 ACC members sponsor the sport. Syracuse and Wake Forest do not sponsor women's swimming or diving. Clemson dropped women's swimming after the 2011–12 season, and dropped women's diving after the 2016–17 season.

Year	Champion
1978–79	NC State
1979–80	NC State
1980–81	North Carolina
1981–82	North Carolina
1982–83	North Carolina
1983–84	North Carolina
1984–85	North Carolina
1985–86	North Carolina
1986–87	Clemson
1987–88	Clemson
1988–89	Clemson
1989–90	Virginia
1990–91	North Carolina
1991–92	North Carolina
1992–93	North Carolina
1993–94	North Carolina
1994–95	North Carolina
1995–96	North Carolina
1996–97	Clemson
1997–98	Virginia
1998–99	Virginia
1999–00	North Carolina
2000–01	North Carolina
2001–02	North Carolina
2002–03	Virginia
2003–04	Virginia
2004–05	Maryland^{†}
2005–06	Florida State
2006–07	North Carolina
2007–08	Virginia
2008–09	Virginia
2009–10	Virginia
2010–11	Virginia
2011–12	Virginia
2012–13	Virginia
2013–14	Virginia
2014–15	Virginia
2015–16	Virginia
2016–17	NC State
2017–18	Virginia
2018–19	NC State
2019–20	Virginia
2020–21	Virginia
2021–22	Virginia
2022–23	Virginia
2023–24	Virginia
2024–25	Virginia
2025–26	Virginia

School	Last conference title	Number of ACC titles
Boston College	never	0
California	never	0
Clemson	1997	4
Duke	never	0
Florida State	2006	1
Georgia Tech	never	0
Louisville	never	0
Maryland	2005	1
Miami	never	0
North Carolina	2007	16
NC State	2019	4
Notre Dame	never	0
Pittsburgh	never	0
Southern Methodist	never	0
Stanford	never	0
Virginia	2026	22
Virginia Tech	never	0

== Tennis ==
=== Men's ===
Before 1964, the team champion was based on regular season performance. The only members that do not sponsor men's tennis are Pittsburgh and Syracuse.

Year	Champion
1954	North Carolina
1955	North Carolina
1956	North Carolina
1957	Maryland^{†}
1958	North Carolina
1959	North Carolina
1960	North Carolina
1961	North Carolina
1962	North Carolina
1963	North Carolina
1964	Maryland^{†}
1965	North Carolina
1966	North Carolina
1967	North Carolina
1968	North Carolina
1968	South Carolina
1969	Clemson
1970	North Carolina
1971	North Carolina
1972	North Carolina
1973	North Carolina
1974	North Carolina
1975	North Carolina
1976	North Carolina
1977	North Carolina
1978	North Carolina
1978	NC State
1979	NC State
1980	Clemson
1981	Clemson
1982	Duke
1983	Clemson
1984	Clemson
1985	Clemson
1986	Clemson
1987 (Note: Tournament canceled due to rain; champion declared based on regular season.)	Clemson
1988	Clemson
1989	Clemson
1990	North Carolina
1991	Duke
1992	North Carolina
1993	Duke
1994	Duke
1995	Duke
1996	Duke
1997	Clemson
1998	Duke
1999	Duke
2000	Duke
2001	Duke
2002	North Carolina
2003	Duke
2004	Virginia
2005	Virginia
2006	Duke
2007	Virginia
2008	Virginia
2009	Virginia
2010	Virginia
2011	Virginia
2012	Virginia
2013	Virginia
2014	Virginia
2015	Virginia
2016	Wake Forest
2017	Virginia
2018	Wake Forest
2019	Wake Forest
2020	Cancelled
2021	Virginia
2022	Virginia
2023	Virginia
2024	Florida State
2025	Stanford
2026	Wake Forest

School	Last conference title	Number of ACC titles
Boston College	never	0
California	never	0
Clemson	1997	11
Duke	2006	12
Florida State	2024	1
Georgia Tech	never	0
Louisville	never	0
Maryland	1964	2
Miami	never	0
North Carolina	2002	25
NC State	1979	2
Notre Dame	never	0
South Carolina	1968	1
Southern Methodist	never	0
Stanford	2025	1
Virginia	2023	15
Virginia Tech	never	0
Wake Forest	2026	4

=== Women's ===
All member institutions sponsored women's tennis until Pittsburgh discontinued its program in 2019. With the addition of new members in 2024, 17 of 18 ACC schools sponsor the sport.

Year	Champion
1977	North Carolina
1978	North Carolina
1979	North Carolina
1980	North Carolina
1981	Clemson
1982	No tournament (Note: The tournament was held in the fall from 1977–1981, and in the spring since 1983.)
1983	Clemson
1984	Clemson
1985	Clemson
1986	Clemson
1987	Clemson
1988	Duke
1989	Duke
1990	Duke
1991	Duke
1992	Duke
1993	Duke
1994	Duke
1995	Duke
1996	Duke
1997	Duke
1998	Duke
1999	Duke
2000	Duke
2001	Duke
2002	North Carolina
2003	Duke
2004	Clemson
2005	Georgia Tech
2006	Georgia Tech
2007	Georgia Tech
2008	Clemson
2009	Duke
2010	Georgia Tech
2011	North Carolina
2012	Duke
2013	Miami
2014	Virginia
2015	Virginia
2016	North Carolina
2017	North Carolina
2018	North Carolina
2019	North Carolina
2020	Cancelled
2021	North Carolina
2022	Duke
2023	NC State
2024	North Carolina
2025	North Carolina
2026	NC State

School	Last conference title	Number of ACC titles
Boston College	never	0
California	never	0
Clemson	2008	8
Duke	2022	18
Florida State	never	0
Georgia Tech	2010	4
Louisville	never	0
Maryland	never	0
Miami	2013	1
North Carolina	2025	13
NC State	2026	2
Notre Dame	never	0
Pittsburgh	never	0
Southern Methodist	never	0
Stanford	never	0
Syracuse	never	0
Virginia	2015	2
Virginia Tech	never	0
Wake Forest	never	0

== Volleyball ==
=== Women's ===
All ACC members sponsor women's volleyball. The only one that sponsors the sport for men is Stanford, which remains a member of the Mountain Pacific Sports Federation for that sport.

The women's volleyball championship was determined through a tournament from 1980 until 2004. Since 2005, champions have been based on the regular season.

Year	Champion
1980	North Carolina
1981	North Carolina
1982	North Carolina
1983	North Carolina
1984	Duke
1985	Duke
1986	Duke
1987	NC State
1988	North Carolina
1989	North Carolina
1990	Maryland^{†}
1991	Duke
1992	Duke
1993	Duke
1994	Duke
1995	Georgia Tech
1996	Maryland^{†}
1997	Clemson
1998	Florida State
1999	North Carolina
2000	North Carolina
2001	North Carolina
2002	Georgia Tech
2003	Maryland^{†}
2004	Maryland^{†}
2005	Maryland^{†}
2005	North Carolina
2006	Duke
2007	Clemson
2008	Duke
2008	North Carolina
2009	Florida State
2010	Duke
2011	Florida State
2012	Florida State
2013	Duke
2014	North Carolina
2015	Louisville
2016	North Carolina
2017	Louisville
2017	Pittsburgh
2018	Pittsburgh
2019	Pittsburgh
2020	Louisville
2021	Louisville
2022	Louisville
2022	Pittsburgh
2023	Florida State
2023	Pittsburgh
2024	Pittsburgh
2025	Pittsburgh
2025	Stanford

School	Last conference title	Number of ACC titles
Boston College	never	0
California	never	0
Clemson	2007	2
Duke	2013	11
Florida State	2023	5
Georgia Tech	2002	2
Louisville	2022	5
Maryland	2005	5
Miami	never	0
North Carolina	2016	13
NC State	1987	1
Notre Dame	never	0
Pittsburgh	2025	7
Southern Methodist	never	0
Stanford	2025	1
Syracuse	never	0
Virginia	never	0
Virginia Tech	never	0
Wake Forest	never	0

== Wrestling ==
The championship was determined on dual meets in 1954 and 1955, with the tournament beginning in 1956. Seven schools (Duke, North Carolina, NC State, Pittsburgh, Stanford, Virginia, and Virginia Tech) will compete in wrestling in the 2024–25 season. The most recent changes to the ACC include the entry of Pitt in 2013 and departure of Maryland in 2014, with Stanford joining in 2024.

Year	Champion
1953–54	Maryland^{†}
1954–55	Maryland^{†}
1955–56	Maryland^{†}
1956–57	Maryland^{†}
1957–58	Maryland^{†}
1958–59	Maryland^{†}
1959–60	Maryland^{†}
1960–61	Maryland^{†}
1961–62	Maryland^{†}
1962–63	Maryland^{†}
1963–64	Maryland^{†}
1964–65	Maryland^{†}
1965–66	Maryland^{†}
1966–67	Maryland^{†}
1967–68	Maryland^{†}
1968–69	Maryland^{†}
1969–70	Maryland^{†}
1970–71	Maryland^{†}
1971–72	Maryland^{†}
1972–73	Maryland^{†}
1973–74	Virginia
1974–75	Virginia
1975–76	NC State
1976–77	Virginia
1977–78	NC State
1978–79	North Carolina
1979–80	North Carolina
1980–81	NC State
1981–82	NC State
1982–83	NC State
1983–84	North Carolina
1984–85	North Carolina
1985–86	North Carolina
1986–87	North Carolina
1987–88	NC State
1988–89	NC State
1989–90	NC State
1990–91	NC State
1991–92	North Carolina
1992–93	North Carolina
1993–94	North Carolina
1994–95	North Carolina
1995–96	NC State
1996–97	North Carolina
1997–98	North Carolina
1998–99	North Carolina
1999–00	North Carolina
2000–01	NC State
2001–02	NC State
2002–03	North Carolina
2003–04	NC State
2004–05	North Carolina
2005–06	North Carolina
2006–07	NC State
2007–08	Maryland^{†}
2008–09	Maryland^{†}
2009–10	Virginia
2010–11	Maryland^{†}
2011–12	Maryland^{†}
2012–13	Virginia Tech
2013–14	Virginia Tech
2014–15	Virginia
2015–16	NC State
2016–17	Virginia Tech
2017–18	Virginia Tech
2018–19	NC State
2019–20	NC State
2020–21	NC State
2021–22	NC State
2022–23	NC State
2023–24	NC State
2024–25	Virginia Tech
2025–26	Virginia Tech

School	Last conference title	Number of ACC titles
Clemson (Note: Clemson sponsored wrestling from 1976–1995)	never	0
Duke	never	0
Georgia Tech (Note: Georgia Tech sponsored wrestling from 1980–1986)	never	0
Maryland	2012	24
North Carolina	2006	17
NC State	2024	21
Pittsburgh	never	0
Stanford	never	0
Virginia	2015	5
Virginia Tech	2026	6
Wake Forest (Note: Wake Forest sponsored wrestling from 1957–1959)	never	0
