= National Register of Historic Places listings in Highlands County, Florida =

Location of Highlands County in Florida

This is a list of the National Register of Historic Places listings in Highlands County, Florida.

This is intended to be a complete list of the properties and districts on the National Register of Historic Places in Highlands County, Florida, United States. The locations of National Register properties and districts for which the latitude and longitude coordinates are included below, may be seen in a map.

There are 17 properties and districts listed on the National Register in the county.

This National Park Service list is complete through NPS recent listings posted March 21, 2025.

Contents: Counties in Florida (non-linked contain no National Register listings)
Alachua - Baker - Bay - Bradford - Brevard - Broward - Calhoun - Charlotte - Citrus - Clay - Collier - Columbia - DeSoto - Dixie - Duval - Escambia - Flagler - Franklin - Gadsden - Gilchrist - Glades - Gulf - Hamilton - Hardee - Hendry - Hernando - Highlands - Hillsborough (Tampa) - Holmes - Indian River - Jackson - Jefferson - Lafayette - Lake - Lee - Leon - Levy - Liberty - Madison - Manatee - Marion - Martin - Miami-Dade (Miami) - Monroe - Nassau - Okaloosa - Okeechobee - Orange - Osceola - Palm Beach - Pasco - Pinellas - Polk - Putnam - St. Johns - St. Lucie - Santa Rosa - Sarasota - Seminole - Sumter - Suwannee - Taylor - Union - Volusia - Wakulla - Walton - Washington

== Current listings ==
	Name on the Register	Image	Date listed	Location	City or town	Description
1	Archbold Biological Station at Red Hill	Archbold Biological Station at Red Hill	July 18, 2007 (#07000698)	123 Main Drive; 27°11′00″N 81°20′58″W	Venus	
2	Avon Park Historic District	Avon Park Historic District	March 22, 1990 (#90000486)	Main Street from South Delaney Avenue to U.S. Route 27; 27°35′44″N 81°30′23″W	Avon Park	
3	Central Station	Central Station	August 14, 1989 (#89001009)	301 North Mango Street; 27°29′49″N 81°26′24″W	Sebring	Part of the Sebring MPS
4	Elizabeth Haines House	Elizabeth Haines House	October 14, 1993 (#93001119)	605 Summit Drive; 27°30′40″N 81°27′36″W	Sebring	Part of the Sebring MPS
5	Edward Hainz House	Edward Hainz House	August 14, 1989 (#89001010)	155 West Center Avenue; 27°29′41″N 81°26′32″W	Sebring	Part of the Sebring MPS
6	Harder Hall	Harder Hall	June 20, 1990 (#90000341)	3300 Golfview Drive; 27°28′10″N 81°28′05″W	Sebring	Part of the Sebring MPS
7	Highlands County Courthouse	Highlands County Courthouse	August 14, 1989 (#89001013)	430 South Commerce Avenue; 27°29′32″N 81°26′13″W	Sebring	Part of the Sebring MPS
8	Highlands Hammock State Park and Florida Botanical Gardens and Arboretum	Highlands Hammock State Park and Florida Botanical Gardens and Arboretum	October 16, 2018 (#100003021)	5931 Hammock Rd. 27°28′16″N 81°32′31″W	Sebring	
9	Highway Park Cemetery		June 1, 2020 (#100005241)	202, 204, and 206 Crestmore Dr. 27°16′20″N 81°20′59″W	Lake Placid vicinity	
10	Kenilworth Lodge	Kenilworth Lodge	June 15, 2000 (#00000661)	836 South Lakeview Drive; 27°29′10″N 81°26′27″W	Sebring	
11	Old Lake Placid Atlantic Coast Line Railroad Depot	Old Lake Placid Atlantic Coast Line Railroad Depot	January 4, 1993 (#92001733)	19 Park Avenue West; 27°17′52″N 81°22′06″W	Lake Placid	
12	Old Pinecrest Hotel	Old Pinecrest Hotel	March 24, 2000 (#00000266)	1609 South Lake Lotela Drive; 27°34′31″N 81°28′20″W	Avon Park	Demolished
13	Old Seaboard Air Line Depot-Sebring	Old Seaboard Air Line Depot-Sebring	March 16, 1990 (#90000425)	East Center Avenue; 27°29′46″N 81°26′05″W	Sebring	Part of the Sebring MPS
14	Santa Rosa Hotel	Santa Rosa Hotel	May 8, 2017 (#100000957)	509 N. Ridgewood; 27°30′00″N 81°26′23″W	Sebring	
15	Sebring Downtown Historic District	Sebring Downtown Historic District	March 16, 1990 (#90000424)	Circle Drive and Ridgewood Drive from Mango Street to Magnolia Avenue; 27°29′43″N 81°26′29″W	Sebring	Part of the Sebring MPS
16	H. Orvel Sebring House	H. Orvel Sebring House	August 14, 1989 (#89001012)	483 South Lake View Drive; 27°29′22″N 81°26′32″W	Sebring	Part of the Sebring MPS
17	Paul L. Vinson House	Paul L. Vinson House	August 14, 1989 (#89001011)	309 North Lake View Drive; 27°29′47″N 81°26′43″W	Sebring	Part of the Sebring MPS

== See also ==
- List of National Historic Landmarks in Florida
- National Register of Historic Places listings in Florida
