= Sebring MPS =

- U.S. National Register of Historic Places
- Location within Florida Location within the United States
- Location: Sebring, Florida
- Coordinates: 27°29′44.24″N 81°26′39.74″W
- MPS: Multiple Resource Area of Sebring, Florida
- NRHP reference No.: 64500125

The following buildings were added to the National Register of Historic Places as part of the Sebring MPS Multiple Property Submission (or MPS).

Resource Name	Also known as	Address	City	County	Added
Central Station		301 North Mango Street	Sebring	Highlands County	August 14, 1989
Elizabeth Haines House		605 Summit Drive	Sebring	Highlands County	October 14, 1993
Edward Hainz House		155 West Center Avenue	Sebring	Highlands County	August 14, 1989
Harder Hall		3300 Golfview Drive	Sebring	Highlands County	June 20, 1990
Highlands County Courthouse		430 South Commerce Avenue	Sebring	Highlands County	August 14, 1989
Seaboard Air Line Depot, Old-Sebring		East Center Avenue	Sebring	Highlands County	March 16, 1990
Sebring Downtown Historic District		Circle Drive and Ridgewood Drive from Mango Street to Magnolia Avenue	Sebring	Highlands County	March 16, 1990
H. Orvel Sebring House		483 South Lake View Drive	Sebring	Highlands County	August 14, 1989
Paul L. Vinson House		309 North Lake View Drive	Sebring	Highlands County	August 14, 1989
