= Sebring Downtown Historic District =

Historic district in Florida, United States

- U.S. National Register of Historic Places
- U.S. Historic district
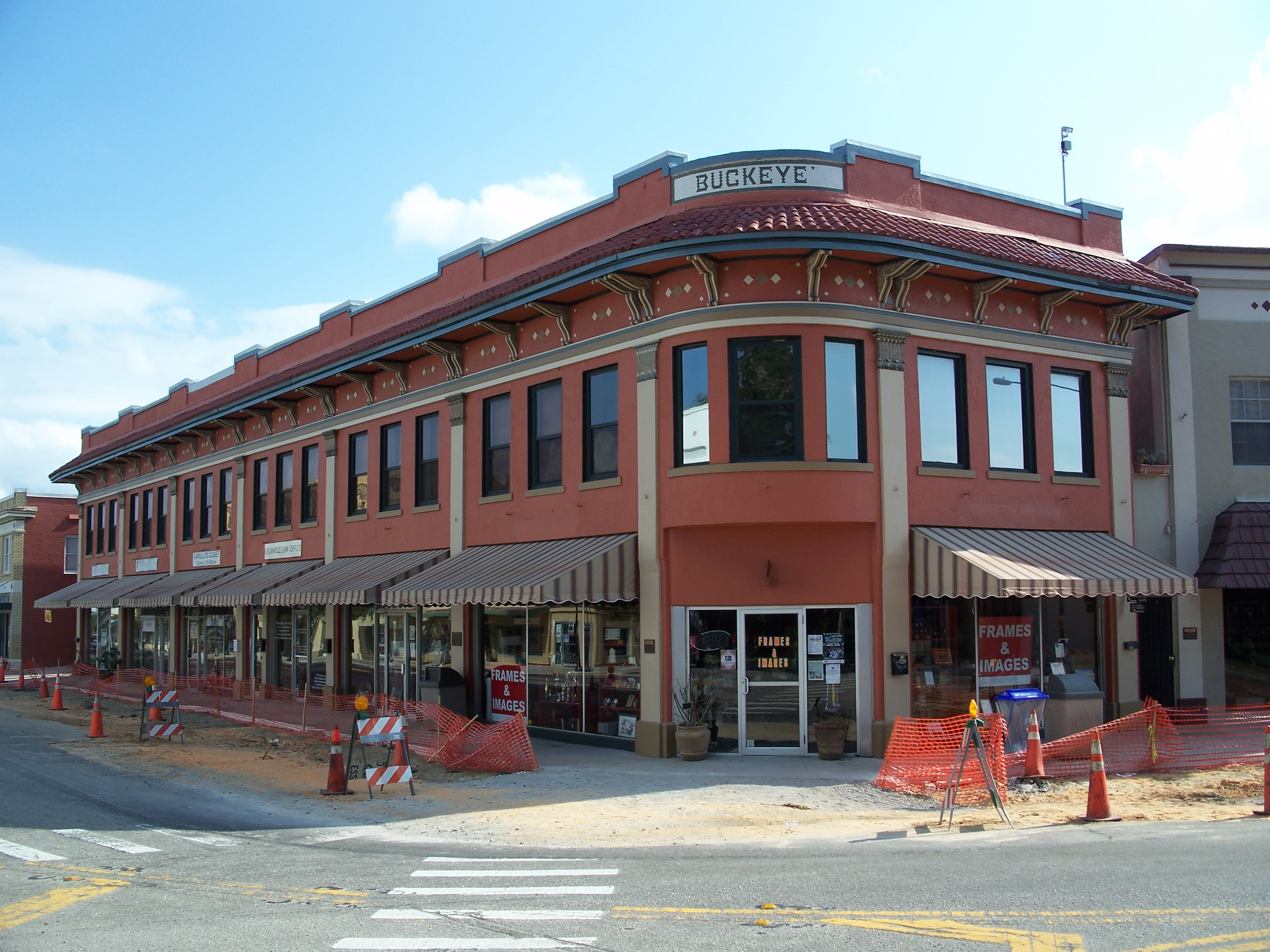
- the Buckeye Building

- Location within Florida Location within the United States
- Location: Circle Dr. and Ridgewood Dr. from Mango St. to Magnolia Ave., Sebring, Florida
- Coordinates: 27°29′43″N 81°26′29″W
- Area: 2 acres (0.81 ha)
- Architectural style: Classical Revival
- MPS: Sebring MPS
- NRHP reference No.: 90000424
- Added to NRHP: March 16, 1990

The Sebring Downtown Historic District is a U.S. historic district (designated as such on March 16, 1990) located in Sebring, Florida. The district is at Circle Drive and Ridgewood Drive from Mango Street to Magnolia Avenue. It contains 22 historic buildings.

The district surrounds "Circle Park", a central, circular park around which the historic district was master planned.

In addition to the Multiple Property Submission (MPS), there are a number of other National Register of Historic Places designated buildings in downtown Sebring, including Central Station, Kenilworth Lodge, the Highlands County Courthouse, Edward Hainz House, the Paul L. Vinson House, the H. Orvel Sebring House, and the Santa Rosa Hotel. Notable but non contributing assets include the Children's Museum of the Highlands, the First National Bank Building, and the Highlands Museum of the Arts.

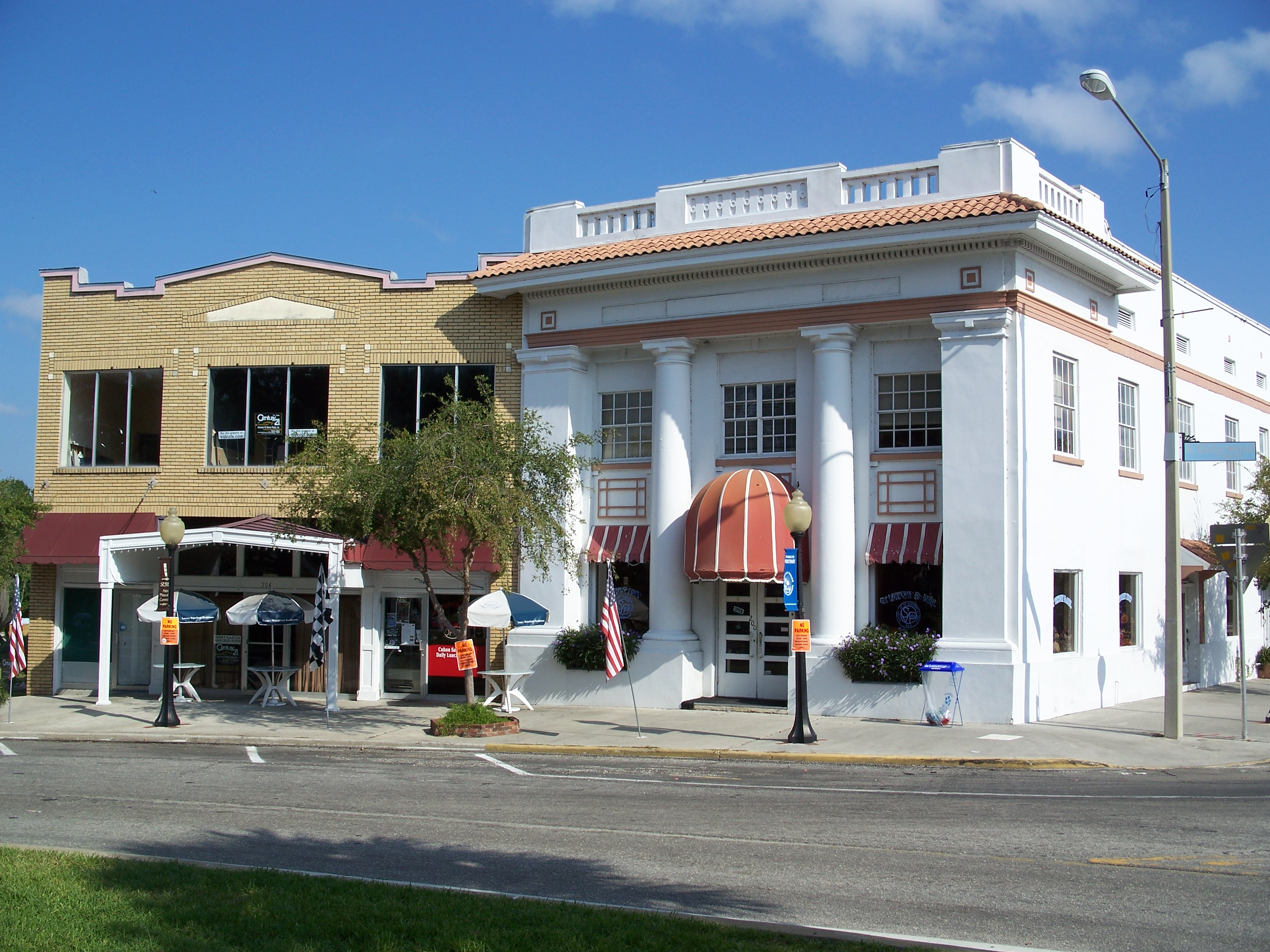
Circle Theater and Highlands Bank and Trust

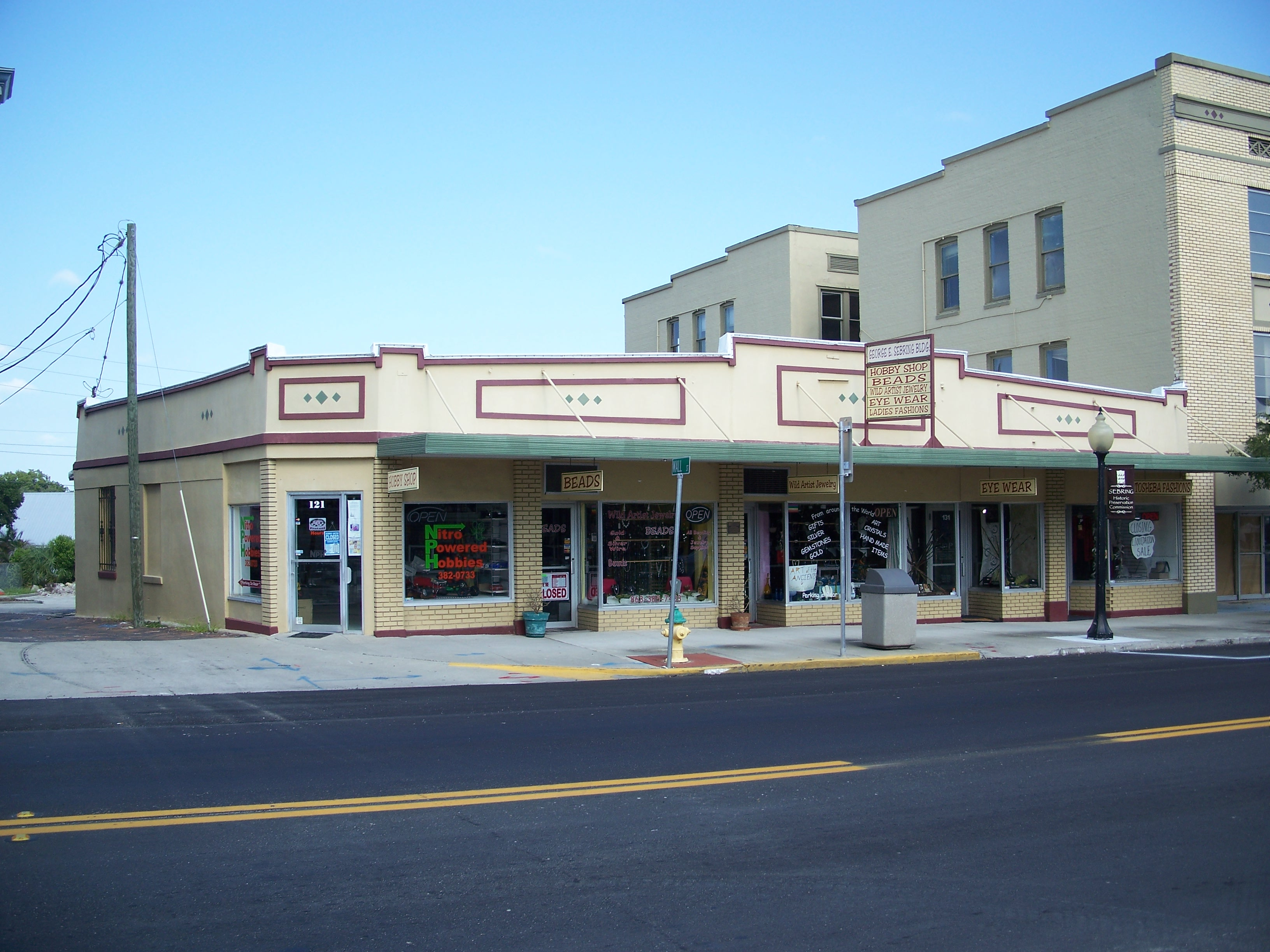
George Sebring Building

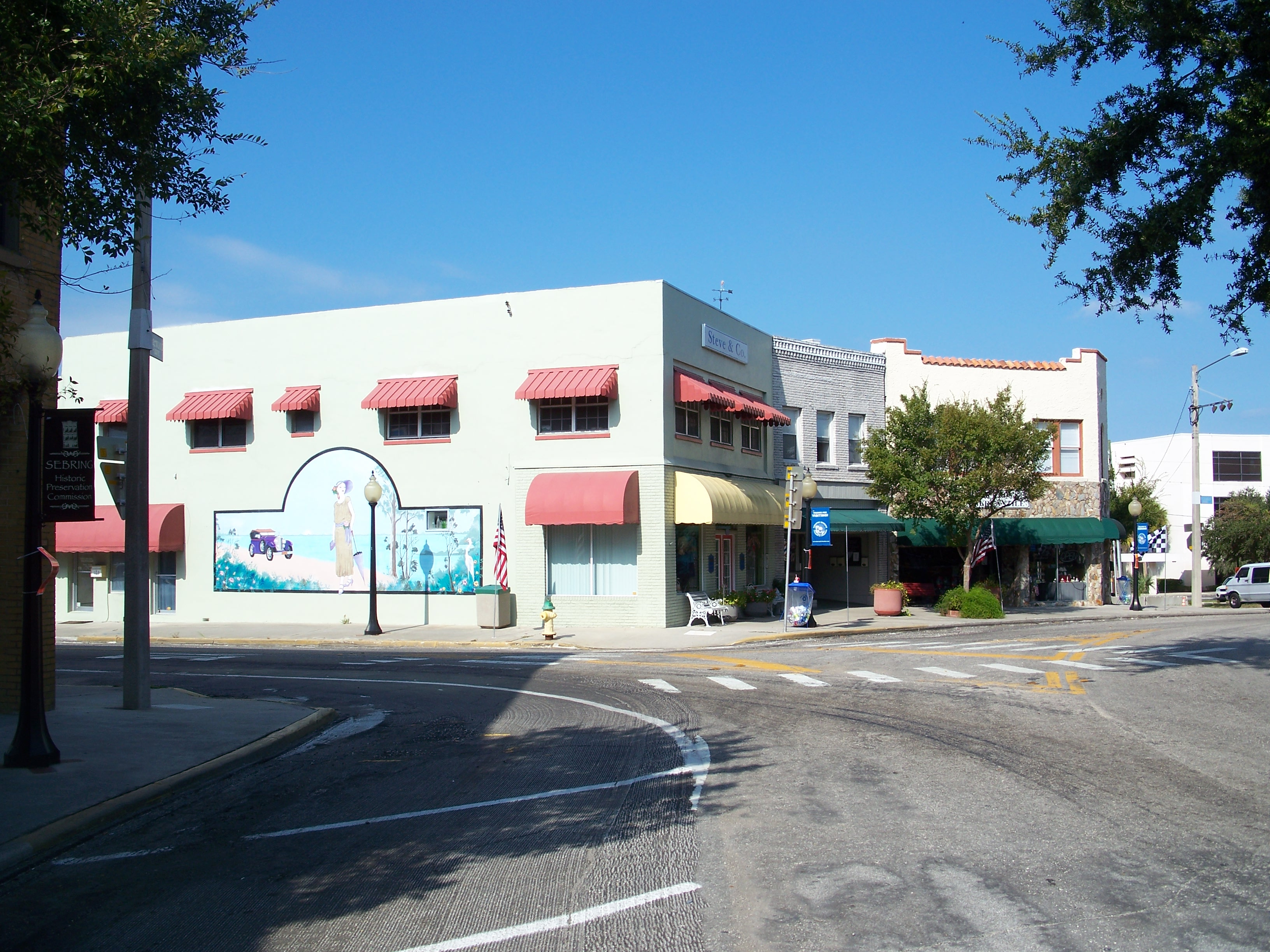

Resource Name	Also known as	Address	City/County	Added
		115 E Center Ave	Sebring, Highlands County	March 16th, 1990
		127-139 E Center Ave	Sebring, Highlands County	March 16th, 1990
Zackary Building		104 N Circle Drive	Sebring, Highlands County	March 16th, 1990
Buckeye Building		108 N Circle Drive	Sebring, Highlands County	March 16th, 1990
Highlands Bank and Trust		200 N Circle Drive	Sebring, Highlands County	March 16th, 1990
Highlands Theater	Circle Theater	202-210 N Circle Drive	Sebring, Highlands County	March 16th, 1990
Skipper Bank Building		300 N Circle Drive	Sebring, Highlands County	March 16th, 1990
Dingus Building		304-308 N Circle Drive	Sebring, Highlands County	March 16th, 1990
Tobin Building		101-103 S Circle Drive	Sebring, Highlands County	March 16th, 1990
J.B. Zeall Building		107 S Circle Drive	Sebring, Highlands County	March 16th, 1990
Roanoke Hotel		209-213 S Circle Drive	Sebring, Highlands County	March 16th, 1990
Board of Trade Building	Downtown Sebring CRA Office	309 S Circle Drive	Sebring, Highlands County	March 16th, 1990
Whitehouse Building		313 S Circle Drive	Sebring, Highlands County	March 16th, 1990
Sebring Real Estate Company Building		115-117 N Ridgewood Drive	Sebring, Highlands County	March 16th, 1990
George Sebring Building		121-127 N Ridgewood Drive	Sebring, Highlands County	March 16th, 1990
Hainz Building	E.L Heinz Bloc	134-138 N Ridgewood Drive	Sebring, Highlands County	March 16th, 1990
		105-115 S Ridgewood Drive	Sebring, Highlands County	March 16th, 1990
Circle Hotel		106 S Ridgewood Drive	Sebring, Highlands County	March 16th, 1990
		112-116 S Ridgewood Drive	Sebring, Highlands County	March 16th, 1990
		136 S Ridgewood Drive	Sebring, Highlands County	March 16th, 1990
		144-154 S Ridgewood Drive	Sebring, Highlands County	March 16th, 1990
