= Sebring =

Sebring may refer to:

== People ==
- Harold Sebring (1898–1968; aka Tom Sebring), an American judge, Florida Supreme Court justice
- George E. Sebring, founder of Sebring, Ohio, USA
- Henry Orvel Sebring, founder of Sebring, Florida, USA
- Janette Sebring Lowrey (1892–1986; born Janette Sebring), U.S. children's author
- Jay Sebring (1933–1969), an American celebrity hair stylist
- Jimmy Sebring (1882–1909), American baseball player
- Steven Sebring (born 1966), American filmmaker
- William Sebring Kirkpatrick (1844–1932), U.S. politician

== Places ==
- Sebring, Florida, a city in Highlands County, Florida, United States
  - Sebring Downtown Historic District
  - Hendricks Army Airfield, a WWII Army Airfield at Sebring, that became a racetrack and civilian airport
    - Sebring International Raceway, a road course auto racing facility in the southeastern United States
    - Sebring Regional Airport, a public use airport six nautical miles southeast of Sebring, Florida
  - Sebring station, a rail station
  - Sebring, Florida metropolitan area
  - H. Orvel Sebring House (Sebring House), an NRHP listed building
  - Sebring High School, Sebring, Florida, USA
- Lake Sebring, a freshwater lake in Highlands County, Florida, United States
- Sebring, Ohio, a village in Mahoning County, Ohio, United States

== Motorsports races ==
- 12 Hours of Sebring, an annual motorsport endurance race for sports cars held at Sebring International Raceway; the most famous Sebring race (the "at Sebring" race, generally)
- 1000 Miles of Sebring, a sports car race held at Sebring International Raceway
- Grand Prix of Sebring, a sports car race held at Sebring International Raceway

== Transportation ==
- Chrysler Sebring, a line of mid-size automobiles that was sold from 1995 through 2010
- Maserati Sebring, a two-door 2+2 coupé manufactured from 1962 until 1968
- Trekking Sebring, a paraglider
- Motobecane/Motomarina Sebring, a moped sold in the 1980s and built by Morini Franco Motori
- Seabring 1948 Monoplane, an airplane, see List of aircraft (Se)
- Sebring (sports car), a British sports car marque

== Other uses ==
- Sebring (horse) (2005–2019), a top class two-year-old Australian Thoroughbred racehorse

== See also ==
- Sebringville, Ontario, Canada
