= Lakeshore Mall =

Lakeshore Mall may refer to:

- Lakeshore Mall (Florida), in Sebring, Florida
- Lakeshore Mall (Georgia), in Gainesville, Georgia
