= Little Red Water Lake =

Lake in the state of Florida, United States

- Location within Florida Location within the United States
- Location: Highlands County, Florida
- Coordinates: 27°32′28″N 81°28′19″W
- Type: natural freshwater lake
- Basin countries: United States
- Max. length: 1.33 miles (2.14 km)
- Max. width: 0.5 miles (0.80 km)
- Surface area: 313.34 acres (127 ha)
- Surface elevation: 102 feet (31 m)

Little Red Water Lake is located in Highlands County, Florida, 0.33 miles (0.53 km) northeast of Lake Sebring and about the same distance south of Lake Joe. This lake is a natural freshwater lake that is very irregularly shaped. It has a 313.34-acre (1,268,000 m^{2}) surface area. It is very marshy in spots; the northwest portion of the lake is almost entirely marsh.

The entire north side of the lake is lined with residential housing and parts of the lake are bordered by citrus groves. A public boat ramp is located near the lake's northwest section. Little Red Water Lake is connected to a number of area lakes by canals. One canal leads northeast to Lake Bonnet and another leads south to Lake Sebring. Public boating and fishing are allowed at this lake, but it has no public swimming areas.
