= Lake Sebring =

Lake in the state of Florida, United States

- Location within Florida Location within the United States
- Location: Highlands County, Florida
- Coordinates: 27°31′43″N 81°29′02″W
- Type: natural freshwater lake
- Basin countries: United States
- Max. length: 1.14 miles (1.83 km)
- Max. width: 0.97 miles (1.56 km)
- Surface area: 494 acres (200 ha)
- Max. depth: 17 ft (5 m)
- Surface elevation: 105 feet (32 m)

Lake Sebring is a natural freshwater lake in Highlands County, Florida, and located north of Sebring, Florida, and Lake Jackson. The lake is somewhat oval shaped and has a 494-acre (2,000,000 m^{2}) surface area. The lake is named for Sebring's developer, George Sebring. It is a shallow muck lake with max depth of 17 feet (5.2 m).

A public boat ramp, on the lake's southwest, is just off Memorial Drive. Canals connect the lake to Little Red Water Lake, to the northeast, and to Lake Jackson, to the south. Canals indirectly connect a number of area lakes to Lake Sebring. Fishing is allowed. The lake has largemouth bass, Florida gar, bowfin, Florida crappie and two types of catfish. No public swimming beaches are on Lake Sebring's shore.
