= Charles Welner =

American football coach

Biographical details
- Born: September 3, 1935; Topsham, Maine
- Died: December 25, 2017 (aged 82); Sebring, Florida
- Education: University of New Hampshire

Coaching career (HC unless noted)
- 1960–1962: York (ME) HS (assistant)
- 1963–1965: York (ME) HS
- 1979–1983: Maranatha Baptist Bible

Head coaching record
- Overall: 5–32 (college)

Accomplishments and honors

Championships
- 3 Maine state football championships (1963–1965)

Awards
- York (ME) HS Hall of Fame (2013)

Charles E. Welner (September 3, 1935 – December 25, 2017) was an American college football coach. He was the head coach of Maranatha Baptist Bible College in Watertown, Wisconsin, from 1979 to 1983, compiling a record of 5–32.

Welner served as a high school coach in a variety of locations during his career. Most notably, he was coach for three Maine state high school football championships at York High School from 1963 to 1965.

== Head coaching record ==
=== College ===
Year	Team	Overall	Conference	Standing	Bowl/playoffs
Maranatha Baptist Bible Crusaders (Upper Midwest Athletic Conference) (1979–1983)
1979	Maranatha Baptist	1–7			
1980	Maranatha Baptist	1–6			
1981	Maranatha Baptist	2–5			
1982	Maranatha Baptist	1–6			
1983	Maranatha Baptist	0–8			
Maranatha Baptist:		5–32			
Total:		5–32			
National championship Conference title Conference division title or championship game berth
