= First National Bank Building (Sebring, Florida) =

Historic Building in Sebring Florida

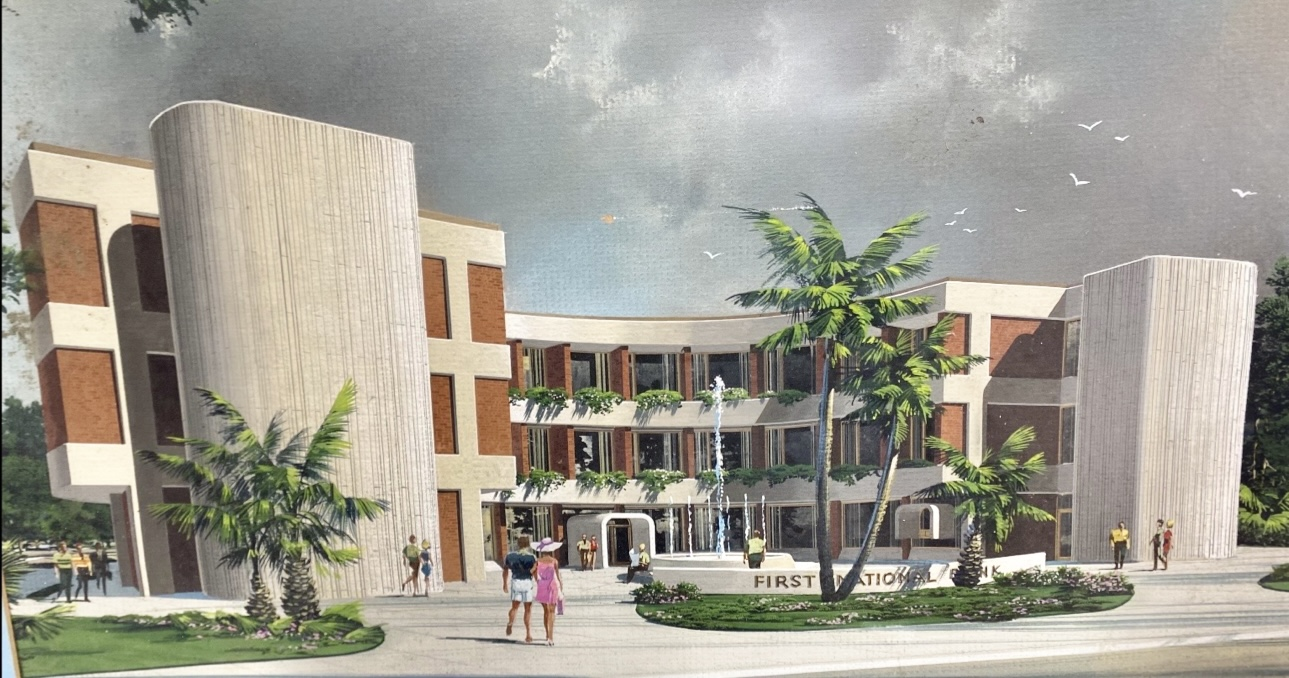
- First National Bank Building
- Interactive map of the First National Bank Building area

General information
- Location: 228 North Ridgewood Drive, Sebring, Florida, United States
- Coordinates: 27°29′51″N 81°26′25″W
- Construction started: 1972
- Completed: 1975
- Cost: more than $500,000
- Client: First National Bank of Sebring

Technical details
- Size: 3 stories

Design and construction
- Architects: William R. Frizzell, Fort Myers, Florida
- Engineer: Builder: Ellis Construction, Tampa, Florida.

The First National Bank Building of Sebring is an historic three-story mid-century modern and brutalist style building located at 228 North Ridgewood Drive in Sebring, Highlands County, Florida.

Built between 1972 and 1975, it was designed by Fort Myers, Florida architect William R. Frizzell.

Frizzell, one of the most accomplished mid-century architects in the state of Florida, died in a plane crash in 1978. In 2009, he was named one of the “125 most influential people in Southwest Florida history”; the AIA FLaSW's highest recognition is named the W.R Frizzell Award in his honor.

== History ==
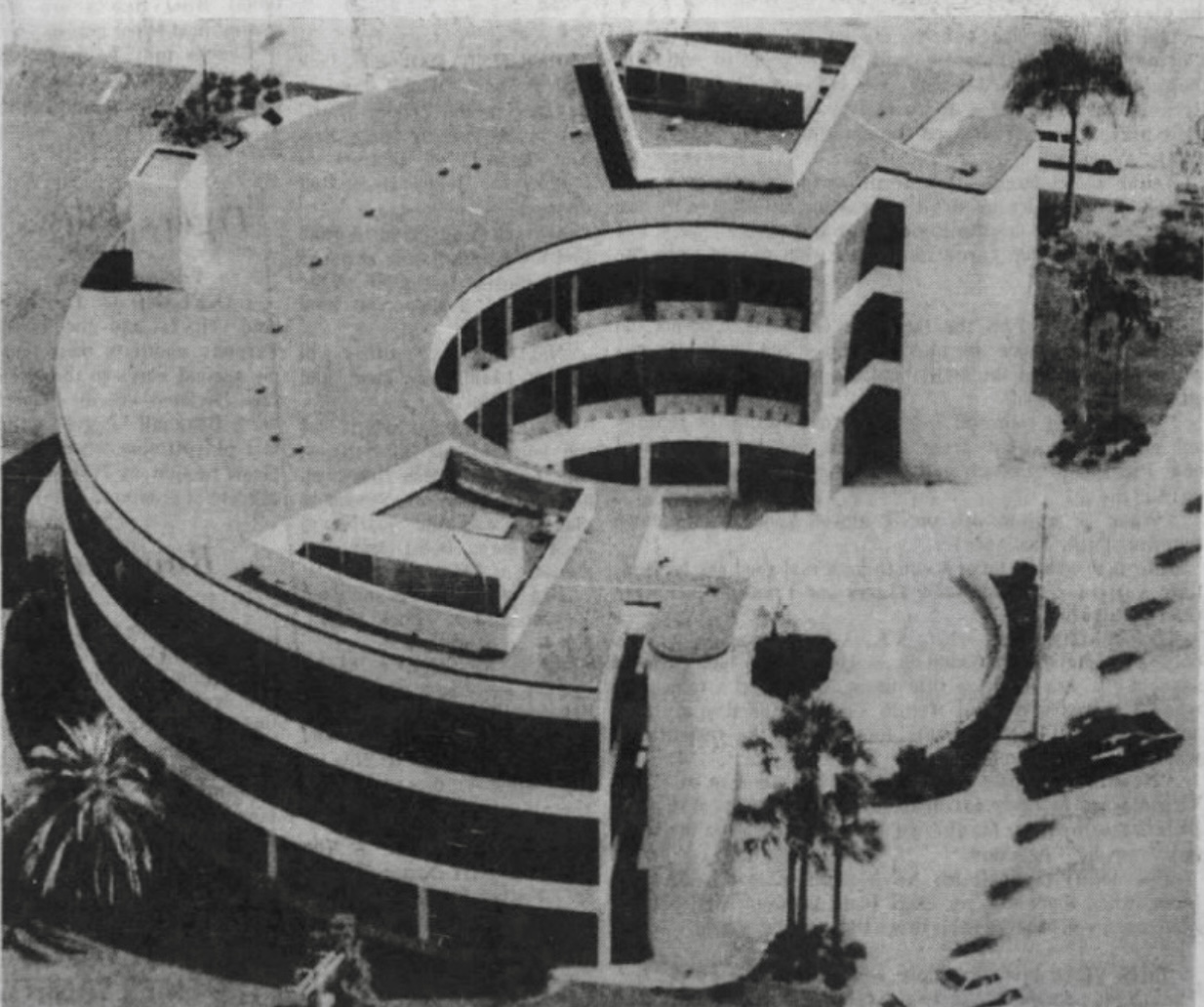
Aerial view of the building showing its semi-circular design

In 1973, the First National Bank of Sebring constructed a newly designed building on what had been the Sebring Tourist Club. The new building, one of the largest in Downtown Sebring was the "talk of the town". It stood in stark contrast to many of the neighboring historic buildings due to its size, mid century style, and centralized courtyard.

The building is built of reinforced concrete, with a semi-circular cantilevered floor plan with the interior of the circle consisting almost entirely of floor to ceiling glass windows. The "new modern" design included a centralized, open loft atrium between the first floor lobby entrance and the second floor. It occupies an entire city block, and features elevator access to the roof.

The building later served as a Wachovia Bank until its closure in 2010. It has been vacant since.

== Future ==
In May 2018, the Sebring City Council moved to purchase the building with the intent of renovating it for a new City Hall location. However, the Council later declined to close on the sale due to concerns over renovation costs, and whether or not a new City Hall was necessary

In March 2025, it was announced that floors two and three of the building would become an IWG coworking space, with the first floor to be utilized as a restaurant and lobby. This would mark the first time ever the building is entirely occupied- the third floor was originally left vacant for future expansion, but was never fully occupied
