= E. O. Douglas High School =

Defunct school in Florida, U.S.

Coordinates: 27.5012°N 81.4204°W

E. O. Douglas High School served African American students during segregation in Sebring, Florida, United States. It was the only high school available to African Americans in Highlands County, Florida. Samuel C. Nixon was its principal from 1946 until it closed in 1970. The school was named for bank president and trustee Eugene Oren Douglas. It became an elementary school in 1967 and closed was closed with desegregation in 1970.

Tigers were the school's mascot. Professional baseball player and coach Hal McRae is an alumnus. The school's band marched in the Sebring Christmas Parade in 1952. An Aircraft Flash call was made from the school and photographed.

Claud C. Marion served as principal of the school. He was the first African American principal in the county. His home is a historic site.

The school buildings became administration buildings and a plaque commemorates its history. Reunions are held annually.
