= Lake Joe =

Lake in the state of Florida, United States

- East Oakwood Drive Lake
- Location within Florida Location within the United States
- Location: Highlands County, Florida
- Coordinates: 27°32′58″N 81°28′05″W
- Type: natural freshwater lake
- Basin countries: United States
- Max. length: 725 feet (221 m)
- Max. width: 700 feet (210 m)
- Surface area: 16.8 acres (7 ha)
- Surface elevation: 102 feet (31 m)

Lake Joe, also known as East Oakwood Drive Lake, is located about two miles southeast of Avon Park, Florida, and about 2.25 miles (3.62 km) north of Sebring, Florida. It is bounded on three sides by citrus orchards and on the south by a wooded area and a set of railroad tracks.

Lake Joe has a 16.8-acre (68,000 m^{2}) surface area and is almost round in shape. This lake is surrounded by private property, so no public fishing, boating or swimming is allowed.
