= Highlands Museum of the Arts =

Coordinates: 27°29′40.5″N 81°26′40.5″W

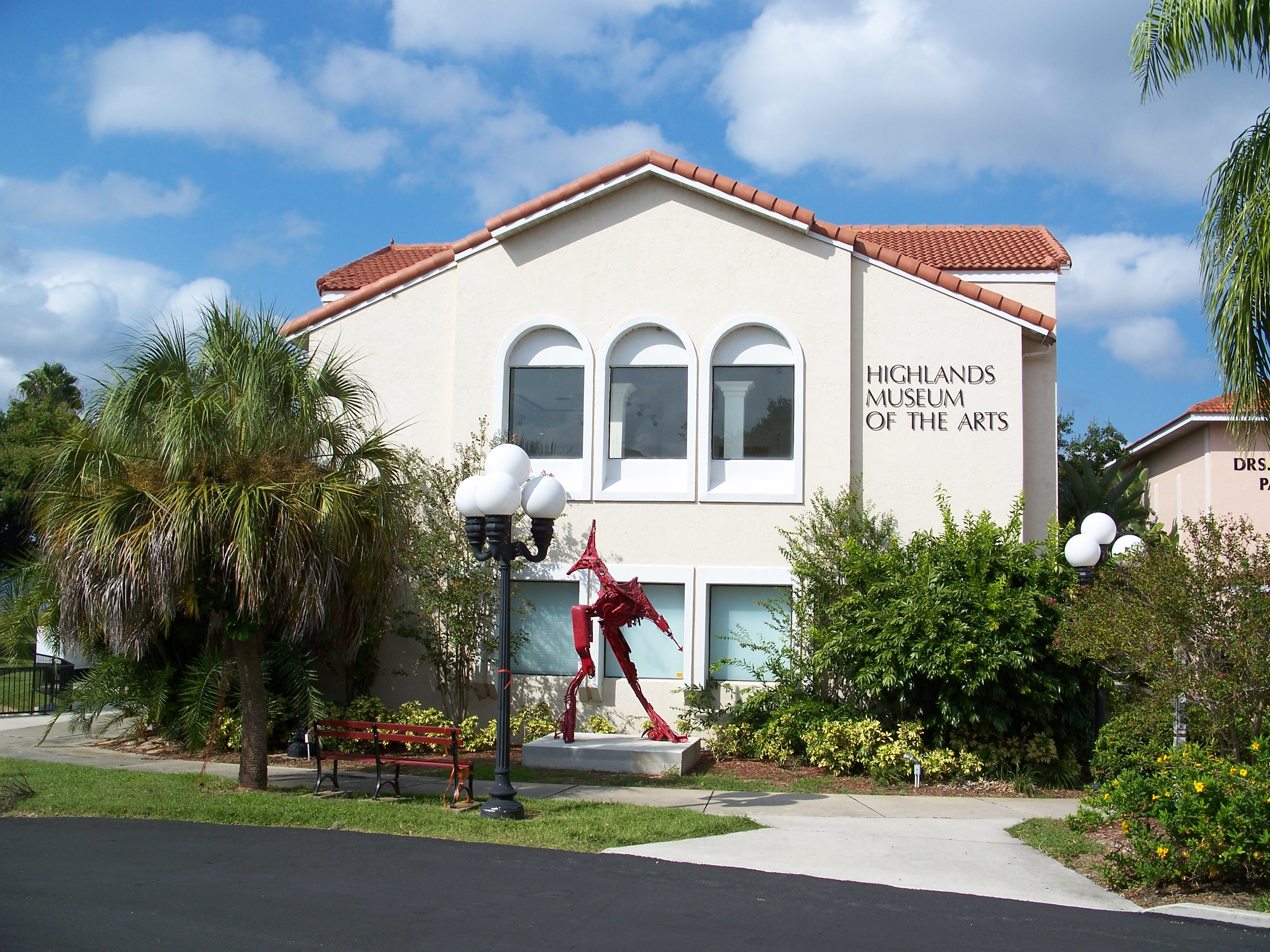

Highlands Museum of the Arts is an art museum in Sebring, Florida, Highlands County, Florida. The museum is located in an historic home at 1971 Lakeview Drive, Sebring, Florida as of September 2023.

Exhibits have included art across many media such as painting, printmaking, sculpture, photography, digital imagery and projection. The Highlands Art League also offers classes in pottery, oils and drawing at the Sebring Art Center nearby. MOTA, Museum of The Arts, hosts art competitions and visiting artist receptions for their exhibition openings with light refreshments and live music.
