= Lake Jackson (Sebring, Florida) =

Lake in the state of Florida, United States

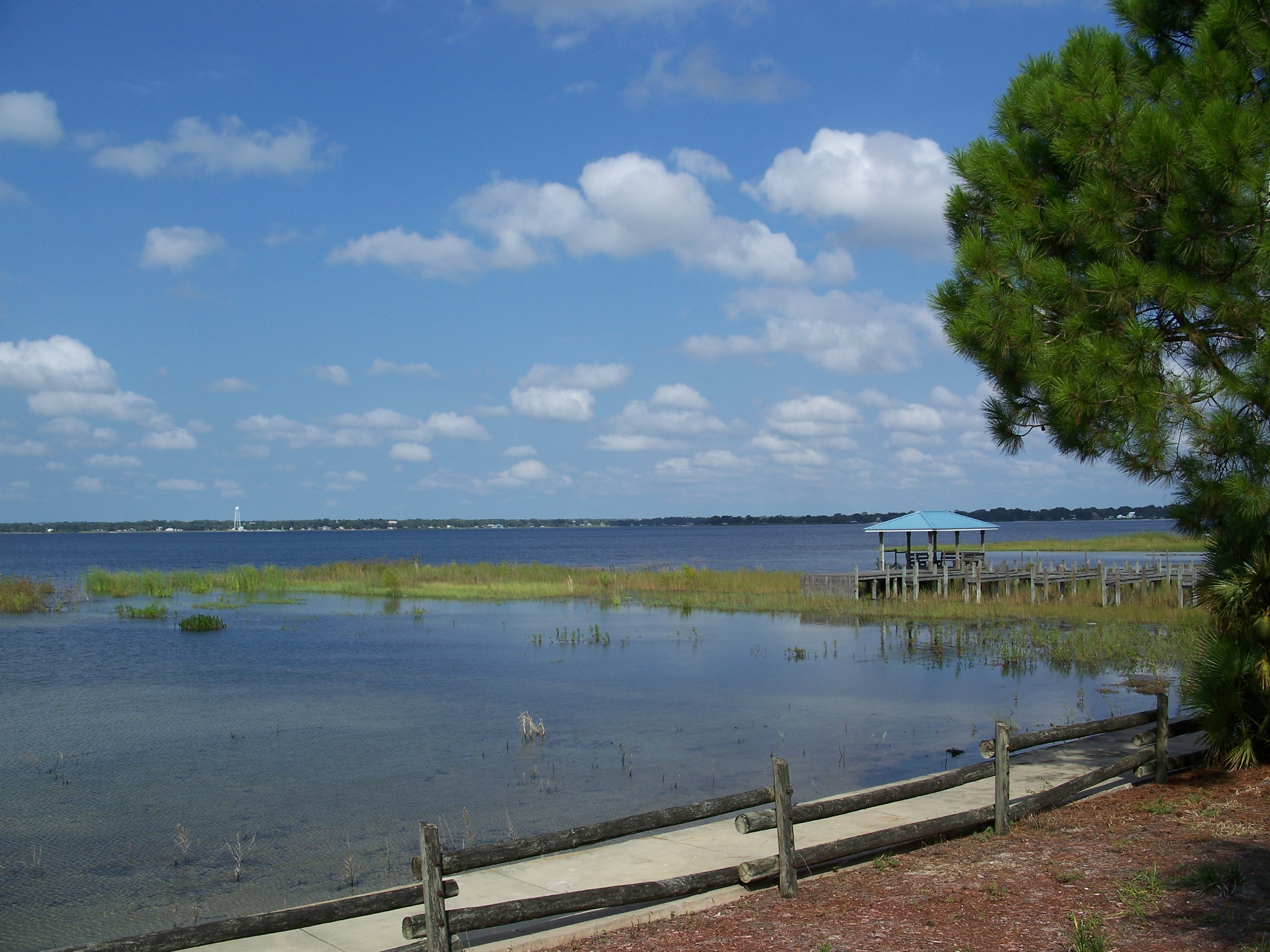

- Location within Florida Location within the United States
- Location: Sebring, Florida
- Coordinates: 27°29′23″N 81°27′43″W
- Basin countries: United States
- Surface area: 3,212 acres (1,300 ha)
- Max. depth: 25 ft (7.6 m)

Lake Jackson, covering 3,212 acres (12.95 km^{2}), is located within the city of Sebring, Florida. Sebring is the county seat of Highlands County. Lake Jackson, a freshwater lake, is approximately 25 feet (8 m) at its deepest. Most of the area is fairly shallow. The water is clear as compared to most lakes and the shores are sandy.
