= Sebring Regional Airport =

Airport in Highlands County, Florida

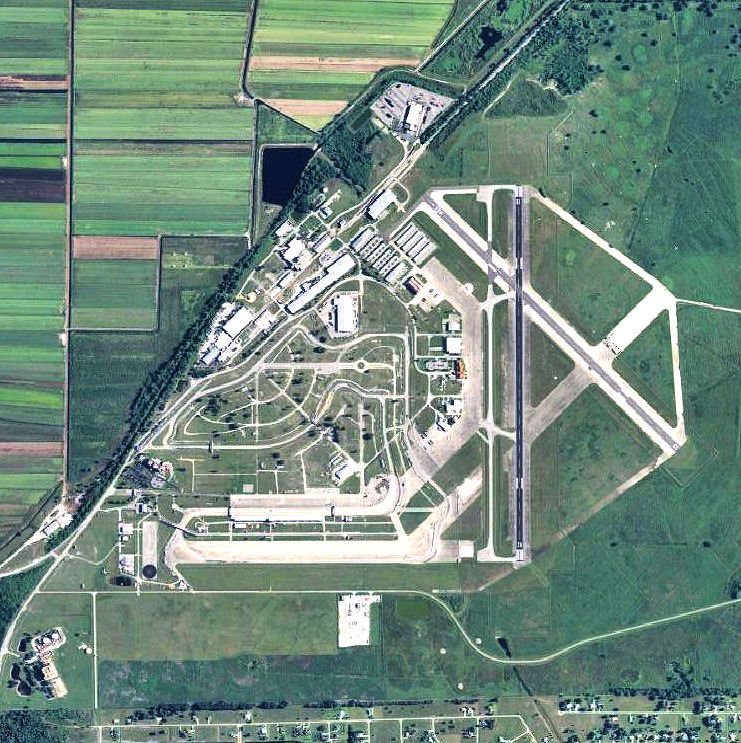
- USGS 2006 orthophoto
- IATA: SEF; ICAO: KSEF; FAA LID: SEF

Summary
- Airport type: Public
- Owner: Sebring Airport Authority
- Serves: Sebring, Florida
- Elevation AMSL: 62 ft / 19 m
- Coordinates: 27°27′23″N 81°20′33″W
- Website: www.sebring-airport.com

Map
- Location of airport in Florida SEF (the United States)

Runways
Direction	Length		Surface
Direction	ft	m	Surface
01/19	5,234	1,595	Asphalt
14/32	4,990	1,521	Asphalt

Statistics (2020)
- Aircraft operations (year ending 10/9/2020): 72,670
- Based aircraft: 97
- Source: Federal Aviation Administration

Sebring Regional Airport (IATA: SEF, ICAO: KSEF, FAA LID: SEF) is a public use airport located six nautical miles (7 mi, 11 km) southeast of the central business district of Sebring, a city in Highlands County, Florida, United States. It is owned by the Sebring Airport Authority. This airport is included in the National Plan of Integrated Airport Systems for 2011–2015, which categorized it as a general aviation facility.

A portion of the old runway system is now Sebring International Raceway, home to the 12 Hours of Sebring, a WeatherTech SportsCar Championship series race which has been held annually since 1952. The airport is also home to a business park and is a Department of Commerce-certified Foreign Trade Zone – FTZ No. 215.

DayJet formerly flew into Sebring Regional Airport through an on-demand system, providing direct flights to approximately one dozen cities. DayJet suspended operations on September 19, 2008; there is no regularly scheduled passenger service into the airport.

== Facilities and aircraft ==
Sebring Regional Airport covers an area of 1,768 acres (715 ha) at an elevation of 62 feet (19 m) above mean sea level. It has two runways with asphalt surfaces: 01/19 is 5,234 by 100 feet (1,595 × 30 m) and 14/32 is 4,990 by 100 feet (1,521 × 30 m).

For the 12-month period ending October 9, 2020, the airport had 72,670 aircraft operations, an average of 199 per day: 99% general aviation and <1% military. At that time there were 97 aircraft based at this airport: 65 single-engine, 20 multi-engine, 3 jet, and 9 helicopter. The airport is also the home of the light-sport aircraft Expo held annually since 2004.

== Governing body ==
The governing body of the airport is the Sebring Airport Authority. It consists of a board of seven members selected by the City Council of the City of Sebring. The terms of board members is four years, and two members are selected each successive year for three years and the remaining member is selected in the fourth year.

== History ==
Sebring Regional Airport was originally constructed in 1940 as Hendricks Field, a B-17 Flying Fortress crew training base of the US Army Air Corps, later the US Army Air Forces.

In 1940, Sebring officials and citizens contacted their Florida congressional delegation to see about getting an Army base in the area. In the summer of 1940, and in early 1941, a group of Army Air Corps officers surveyed the area. On June 12, 1941, Congressman J. Hardin Peterson advised that an area of 9,200 acres (3,700 ha) of woodland had been approved for a basic flying school. The City of Sebring purchased the land and leased it to the government at $1 per year for 99 years. With the end of the war in 1945, the training program began to wind down during September and October, and by mid-November the order came to inactivate the base by December 31, 1945.

On February 21, 1946, the city received a permit to operate a civilian airfield on the site and on May 1, 1946, the abandoned airfield was turned over to the City of Sebring to become Sebring Air Terminal, now Sebring Regional Airport & Commerce Park.

In December 1950, the first sports car endurance race was held, and since then the world-famous 12 Hours of Sebring Grand Prix of Endurance has been held in March each year, with the race track taking the East-West ramp and the closed Runway 9/27, along with some streets of the former air base-turned commerce park.

Only the main hangar, restored in 2000, is now in use. New water and sewage systems were completed, and the military's former high water tower, a very noticeable landmark, was brought down in December 1997. The original military control tower was brought down in December 1999 and has been restored and re-erected as a historical icon, although the airport continues to operate as an uncontrolled airfield.

=== Aviation Expo at Sebring Airport ===
Starting in 2004, Sebring became the home to the annual US Sport Aviation Expo. By 2015, the event had grown to 140 exhibitors. May 30, 2019, the Sebring airport authority announced the event permanently scrubbed.

== Incidents ==
On December 5, 1978, Douglas C-53 N25656 of Caribe Air Sales crashed shortly after take-off and was destroyed by fire. The gust locks had not been removed before flight and the aircraft was overloaded. All three people on board were killed.

== Sports car racing ==
Following the end of World War II, aeronautical engineer Alec Ullman, seeking sites to restore military aircraft for civilian use, saw potential in Hendricks Field's runways to stage a sports car endurance race, similar to the 24 Hours of Le Mans. Sebring's first race was held on New Year's Eve of 1950, and the first 12 Hours of Sebring was held on March 15, 1952. The latter would grow to be a major international race. In 1959, the racetrack hosted the first Formula One United States Grand Prix.

For much of Sebring's history, the track followed a 5.38 mile (8.66 km) layout. In 1983, the track was changed to allow simultaneous use of the track and one of the runways. In 1987, more changes allowed use of another runway. Further changes in 1991 accommodated expansion of the airport's facilities, and brought the track close to its current configuration. The entire track could now be used without interfering with normal airport operations.

== See also ==
- List of airports in Florida
- Sebring International Raceway

== Other sources ==
- Manning, Thomas A. (2005), History of Air Education and Training Command, 1942–2002. Office of History and Research, Headquarters, AETC, Randolph AFB, Texas OCLC 71006954, 29991467
- Shaw, Frederick J. (2004), Locating Air Force Base Sites, History’s Legacy, Air Force History and Museums Program, United States Air Force, Washington DC. OCLC 57007862, 1050653629
