= Lakeshore Mall (Florida) =

Shopping mall in Sebring, Florida

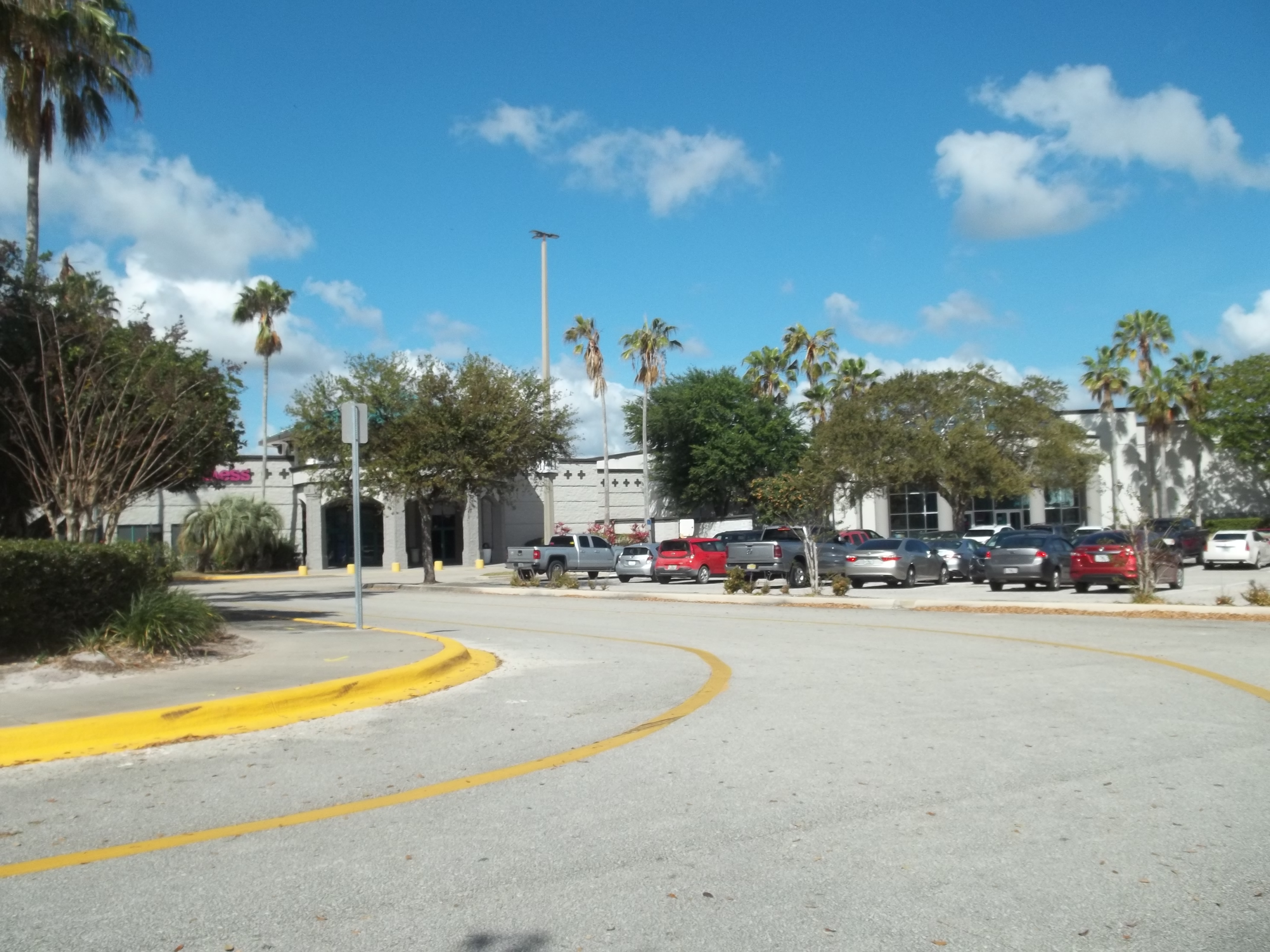
- Location: Sebring, Florida, United States
- Coordinates: 27.489847°N 81.487184°W
- Opened: 5 February 1992; 34 years ago
- Manager: BVB Properties
- Num. of stores: 65+
- Num. of anchor tenants: 5
- Floor area: 495,972 sq ft (46,077.3 m^{2})
- Floors: 1
- Parking: 2,884
- Website: lakeshoremall.com

Lakeshore Mall is a regional, enclosed shopping mall located in Sebring, Florida, United States. It opened in 1992. Lakeshore Mall comprises 495,972 square feet (46,077 m^{2}) of retail space, including four anchor stores: Bealls, Belk, Rural King, and Your Storage Units. JCPenney was also an anchor store until they closed in 2020. The mall also features more than sixty-five store locations, as well as a food court and AMC movie theater.

== History ==
In late 2007, the mall took the unusual step of requiring all high-school aged and younger youths to leave the property by 9pm.

The drawing power of the Mall has attracted the attention of other retail builders. Plaza By The Mall has been built on an adjoining property attempting to cash in on some of the recognition.

In May 2014, CBL & Associates Properties sold the mall to BVB Properties.

On November 2, 2017, Sears Holdings announced that Kmart would be closing as part of a plan to close 63 Sears and Kmarts nationwide. Kmart closed on January 28, 2018.

On August 6, 2019 Sears announced that its store would be closing this location as part of a plan to close 26 stores nationwide. The store closed in October 2019.

On June 4, 2020, JCPenney announced that this location would close as part of a plan to close 154 stores nationwide, leaving Belk and Bealls as the only anchor stores in the mall. There is also a Planet Fitness and a smoothie vendor.

During the COVID-19 pandemic, the former JCPenney location became a site for Coronavirus vaccine distribution. Florida Governor Ron DeSantis visited the site in March 2021 but the site has since closed.

In the 2020s, Your Storage Units, a storage company, opened a location inside the former Kmart anchor space. Utilizing all of the space.

In 2025, it was announced that Rural King would open a store inside the former Sears anchor space. Rural King began construction on the space in 2025, renovating the existing building. Rural King held a soft opening to the public on April 9, 2026. A grand opening ceremony was held a few days later on April 17, 2026.
