= York High School (Maine) =

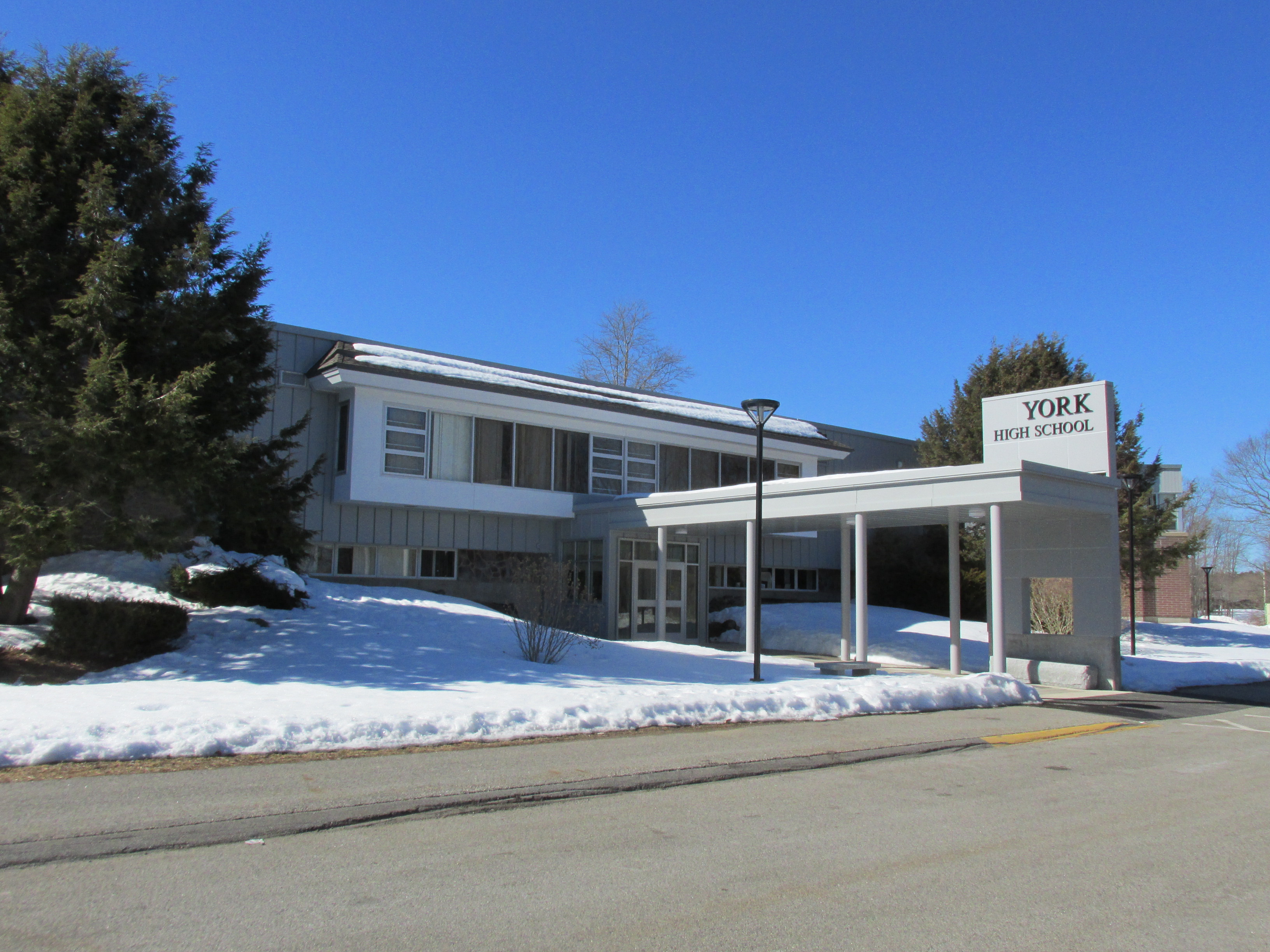
- York High School

Location
- 1 Robert Stevens Drive; York, Maine; United States; 43°9′18″N 70°37′45″W

Information
- Type: Public, secondary
- Motto: "Knowledge is Power"
- Established: 1889
- Faculty: 107
- Teaching staff: 52.00 (FTE)
- Grades: 9–12
- Enrollment: 501 (2023-2024)
- Student to teacher ratio: 9.63
- Campus size: Small
- Campus type: Suburban
- Colors: Columbia Blue and white
- Athletics: football, basketball, soccer, baseball, softball, Ice hockey wrestling, track and field, lacrosse, tennis, golf, cheerleading, field hockey
- Athletics conference: Western Maine, Class B
- Mascot: Wildcat
- Newspaper: Agamenticus Sun
- Website: yhs.yorkschools.org

York High School is a public secondary school in York, Maine, United States.

== Athletics ==
York High School has an athletic program with four coed sports, 11 female sports, and 10 male sports. The coed sports teams include golf, skiing, unified basketball and wrestling. The female sports include basketball, cross country, field hockey, ice hockey, indoor and outdoor track and field, lacrosse, soccer, softball, tennis, and volleyball. The male sports are baseball, basketball, cross country, football, ice hockey, indoor and outdoor track and field, lacrosse, soccer, and tennis.

The golf team, girls' basketball, indoor track and soccer teams won the state championships in 2010. The boys' ice hockey team won the Western Maine title in 2010 and the wrestling team has also had 6 state champions since 1995. Rick Clark, the girls' basketball head coach, was inducted into the New England Basketball Hall of Fame. In 2016 the school won its third straight Maine Class B Field Hockey title, having gone undefeated for each of the three years. The boys indoor track team has seen particular success in the past eight years, winning five of the last eight Maine State Class B championships, the most recent being in 2019.

== Library ==
The Ethel "Babe" Sewall Library was named after Ethel Sewall, the first district librarian for the York School Department. Sewell was a leader in school libraries, having pioneered the integration of media and books, to support all learning styles. The library is staffed by Nicole Masterson and Alyssa Skaves. The school provides students and staff with a variety of materials and databases to support the school curriculum and personal growth.

== Notable alumni ==
- Christopher Cassidy, astronaut
