= Lakeshore Mall (Georgia) =

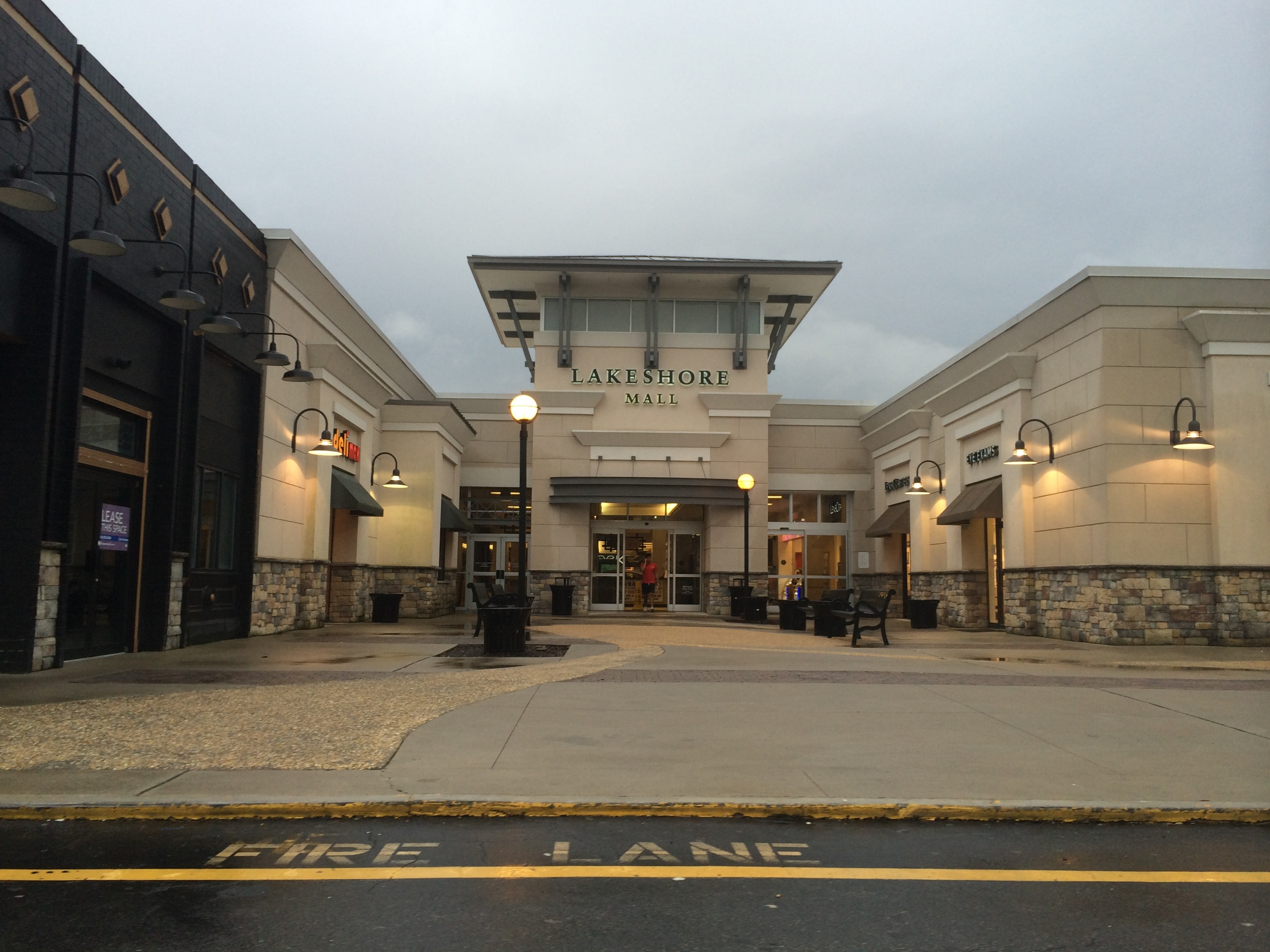
- Entrance to Lakeshore Mall, April 2015
- Location: Gainesville, Georgia, United States
- Coordinates: 34.2937°N 83.8443°W
- Address: 150 Pearl Nix Parkway
- Opened: 1970
- Developer: Lakeshore Plaza Enterprises, inc
- Manager: Jones Lang Lasalle
- Owner: Branch Lake Associates LLC
- Num. of stores: 50+
- Num. of anchor tenants: 5 (3 open, 2 vacant)
- Floor area: 500,000 sq ft (46,000 m^{2})
- Floors: 1
- Website: https://www.lakeshoremallga.com/

Lakeshore Mall is a regional enclosed shopping mall located in Hall County, Georgia. The mall is anchored by two Belk stores and a Dick's Sporting Goods, with two vacant anchors with JCPenney and Sears.

== History ==
On May 11, 1968, ground was broken for what was then called Lakeshore Plaza, slated to become the largest mall outside the metro-Atlanta area at the time. The property was developed by a group of Gainesville investors operating under the name Lakeshore Plaza Enterprises, Inc., with a total estimated cost of 3 million dollars.

The proposed anchors comprised a 110,000-square-foot JCPenney, which relocated from South and Main, along with a 24,000-square-foot Roses, both planned for future expansions. Another anchor, a 15,325-square-foot A&P Supermarket, was also included in the plan. It was scheduled for construction during the first phase and was expected to open in the second phase.

Lakeshore Plaza Mall would officially open on August 14 as North Georgia's only enclosed shopping mall. Some tenants would include Bell Shoes, Dipper Dan, Gem Jewelry Co., Jacobs Drugs, Ragland Book Store, Southern shoes, and Whit and Bobbie's.

Belk-Gallant opened a location at the mall in 1973 and relocated from its downtown store.

A&P would liquidate and close in April 1980, which would be replaced by Knickers.

In 1986, Atlanta developer Scott Hudgens would purchase Lakeshore Mall and immediately announce an expansion which would feature a food court, a GA 4 theater, small shops, and a SEARS department store on the other side of the JCPenney. At this time, Roses would relocate to a new 54,000 sqft store and Belk would undergo a 20,000 sqft expansion.

Roses would close its location in February 1994, and it would become a second Belk store. Knickers would close in 1991 and would be replaced by Ruby Tuesday in July 1992. In 1994, SEARS would undergo a major renovation to its store. In 1998, Colonial Properties would purchase the mall from Scott Hudgens.

When the Hollywood 15 opened, Lakeshore continued to show first-run films as Georgia Theatre Company took over operations after Storey folded. Lakeshore became a 99-cent theater after 2000 and closed in September 2007. It was demolished in 2013. The theater was located in the food court of the mall.

In 2006 the mall received an entire overhaul from its original look, featuring renovations include new flooring, welcoming seating areas, updated restrooms, a new family restroom and updated entrances.

In 2008, Colonial Properties would put the mall up for sale and JLL would manage the mall at the time. In 2010, Garrison investment would purchase the mall in a bankruptcy sale.

Dick's Sporting Goods would open a 50,000 square foot location at Lakeshore Mall, occupying an area in the demolished inline mall space and food court between JCPenney and Sears. Ribbon cutting ceremonies were held on the evening of October 1, 2013.

The mall was purchased by Stockbridge Enterprises, an investment group based near Detroit, Michigan in April 2017.

On December 28, 2018, it was announced that Sears would be closing as part of a plan to close 80 stores nationwide. The store will close in March 2019.

On June 4, 2020, it was announced that JCPenney will be closing around October 2020 as part of a plan to close 154 stores nationwide. On November 23, 2023, Branch Lakeshore Associates LP purchased the mall from Stockbridge for $15 million.

In November 2024, Branch Properties announced plans to redevelop Lakeshore Mall into an open-air plaza. Belk will remain on-site, while Dick's Sporting Goods will relocate within the property once redevelopment begins. The project will feature 652 multifamily residences, 38,200 square feet of outdoor greenspace, and 305,000 square feet of retail space. Construction is scheduled to begin in late 2026.

In January 2025, Belk department store announced plans to start moving its Men's section at Lakeshore Mall in Gainesville into the Women's section later this year as part of redevelopment plans.

In February 2025, plans for the redevelopment were approved. The project, known as Lakeshore, is set to break ground in late 2026 and is expected to be completed in 2028.

== List of anchor stores ==
Name	Year opened	Year closed	Notes
JCPenney	1969	2020	
Roses	1969	1994	
Belk	1973	-	
Belk	1999	-	Replaced Roses
SEARS	1986	2019	
Dick's Sporting Goods	2013	-	Replaced 1986 addition
