= Kenilworth Lodge =

- U.S. National Register of Historic Places
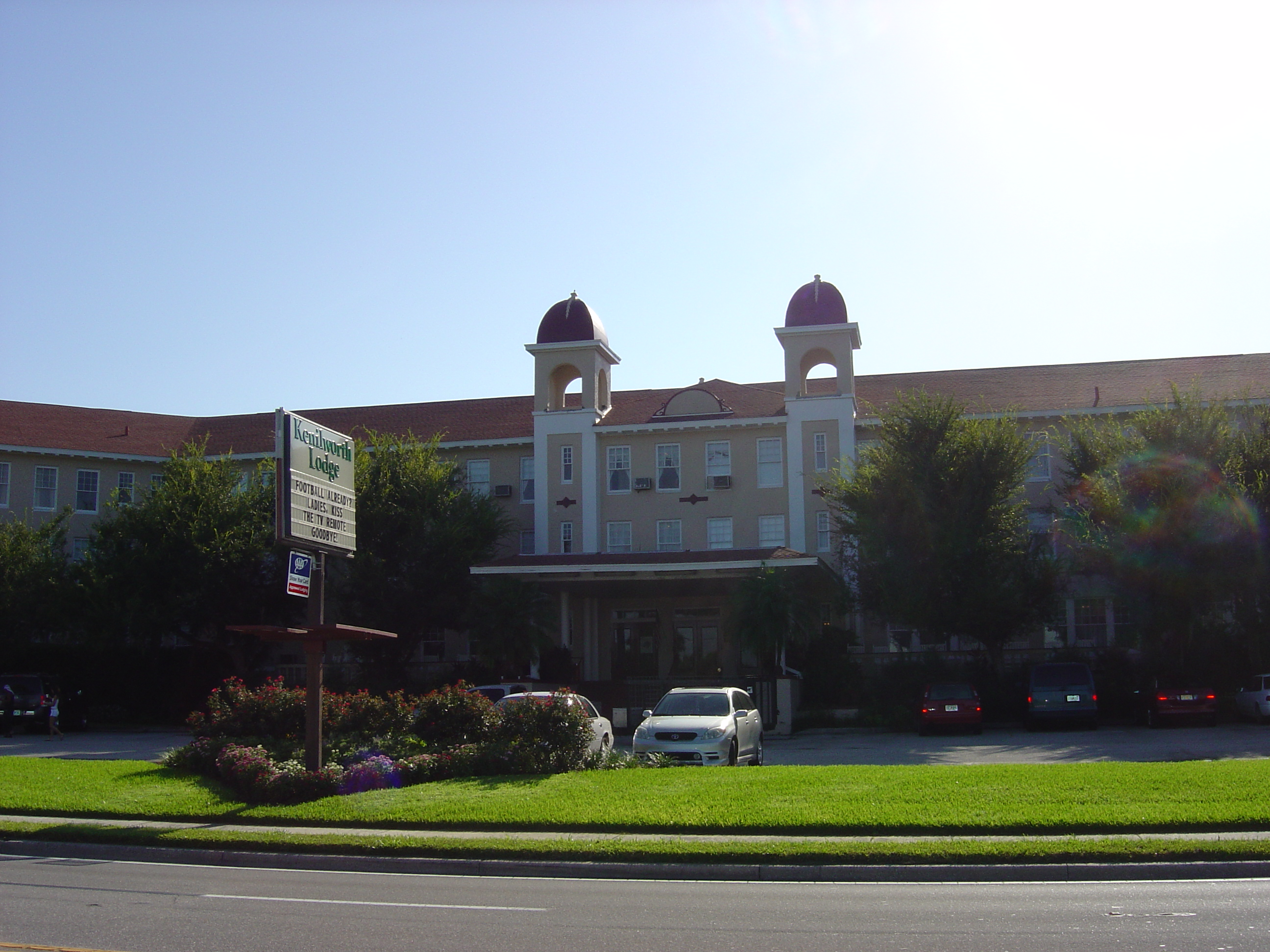
- Kenilworth Lodge
- Location: 1610 Lakeview Dr.Sebring, Florida
- Coordinates: 27°29′12″N 81°26′25″W
- Built: 1916
- Built by: B. A. Cope
- Architect: Bonfoey & Elliott
- Architectural style: Mediterranean Revival
- NRHP reference No.: 00000661
- Added to NRHP: 15 June 2000

The Kenilworth Lodge was an historic resort hotel located at 1610 Lakeview Drive in Sebring, Florida. Built in 1916 for George E. Sebring, the developer of the town of Sebring, it was continuously in use as a hotel until it was closed in 2016 for fire code violations. It was designed by Bonfoey & Elliott of Tampa, Florida in the Mediterranean Revival style of architecture. It was built by contractor B. A. Cope.

On June 15, 2000, it was added to the National Register of Historic Places.
