= Elizabeth Haines House =

Historic house in Florida, United States

- U.S. National Register of Historic Places
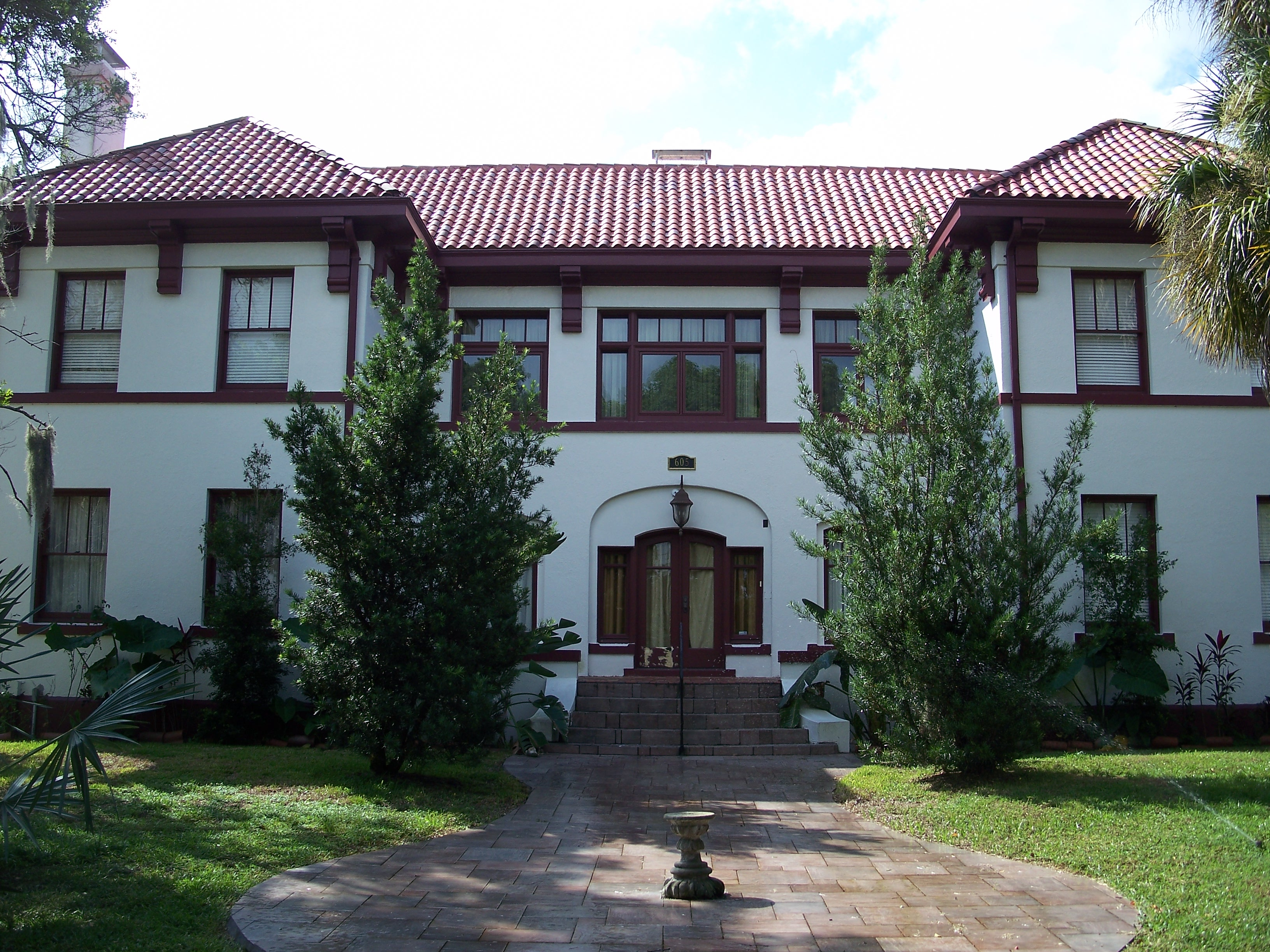

- Location within Florida
- Location: 605 Summit Dr., Sebring, Florida
- Coordinates: 27°30′40″N 81°27′36″W
- Area: 1.4 acres (0.57 ha)
- Built: 1928
- Architectural style: Mission/Spanish Revival
- MPS: Sebring MPS
- NRHP reference No.: 93001119
- Added to NRHP: October 14, 1993

The Elizabeth Haines House is a historic house in Sebring, Florida. It is located at 605 Summit Drive. It was built in 1928. On October 14, 1993, it was added to the U.S. National Register of Historic Places. The property is currently owned by the Lindsay-Moore family as of April 2020.
