= Santa Rosa Hotel =

Hotel in Florida, United States

- U.S. National Register of Historic Places
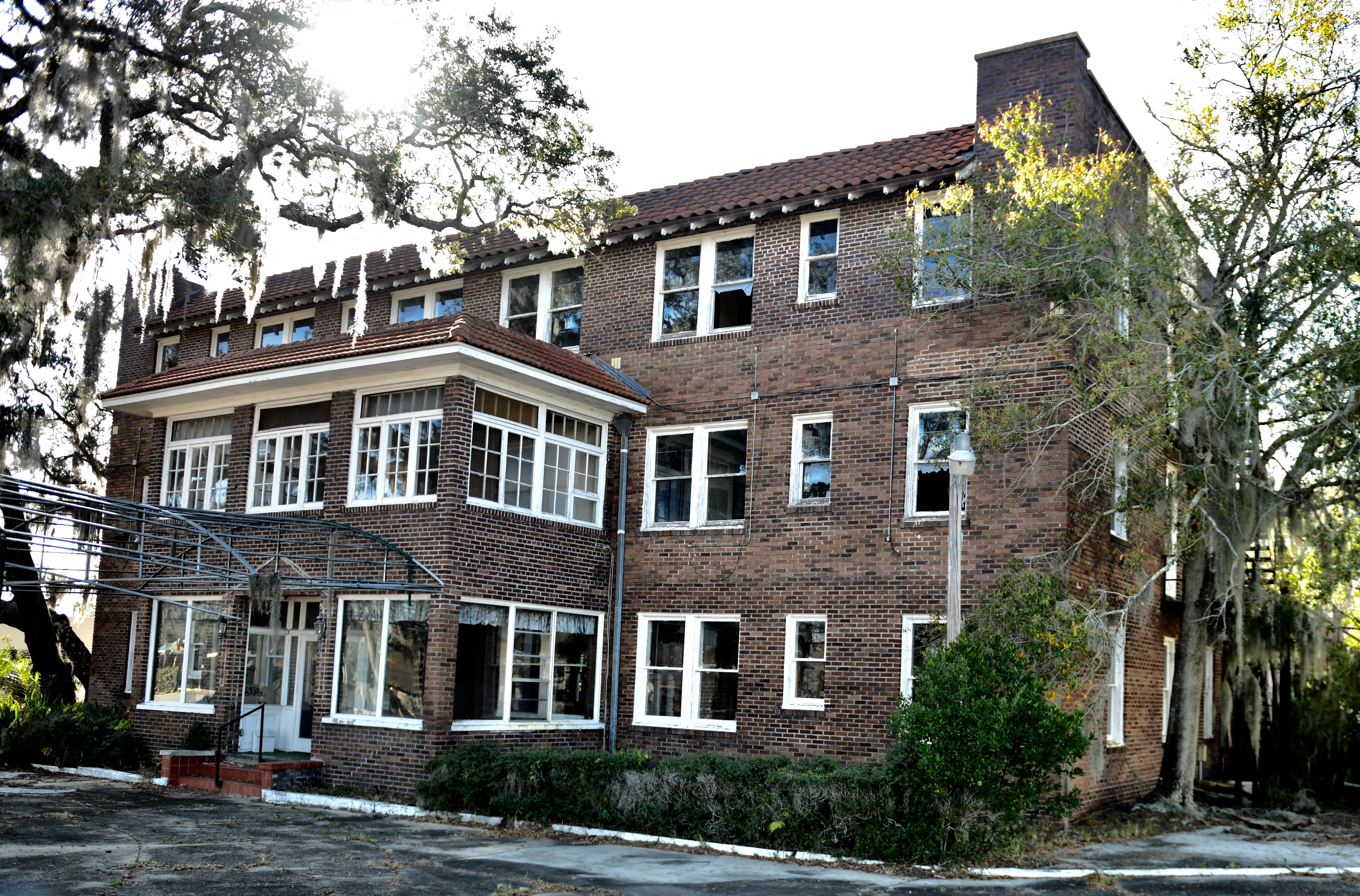
- Santa Rosa Hotel
- Location: 509 N Ridgewood Drive, Sebring, Florida
- Built: 1923
- Built by: Aaron Withers
- Architect: Unknown
- Architectural style: Masonry Vernacular, Mediterranean Revival
- MPS: Sebring MPS
- NRHP reference No.: 100000957
- Added to NRHP: May 8, 2017

The Santa Rosa Hotel is a heritage listed building, located at 509 North Ridgewood Drive, Sebring, Florida.

Built in 1923 by prominent Sebring businessman Aaron Withers, the hotel was "designed for businessmen who desired proximity to the central downtown area and travelers on a brief visit to Sebring". The 30 room two-storey hotel opened in 1924, at a cost of $75,000. A third storey was added in 1926. The hotel was subsequently converted into a 19-room, five suite hotel, with a restaurant.

In 1988, owners Jan and Don Bowden purchased the property, gutted it, and reopened the renovated hotel with 21 single and double rooms, with four suites and a formal dining room.

The hotel was damaged by multiple hurricanes in 2004, and has been vacant ever since, with multiple failed apartment conversions dating back to 2006.

On May 8, 2017, it was added to the National Register of Historic Places, as a representative of one of the small tourist hotels constructed in Sebring, during the Florida real estate boom of the mid-1920s and one of the oldest surviving commercial buildings in Sebring.

On August 31, 2024, it was announced that owner Ravi Gandhy, of Lorgsebfl had signed a contract to demolish the structure by November 30 at a cost of $72,625.
