= Central Station (Sebring, Florida) =

- U.S. National Register of Historic Places
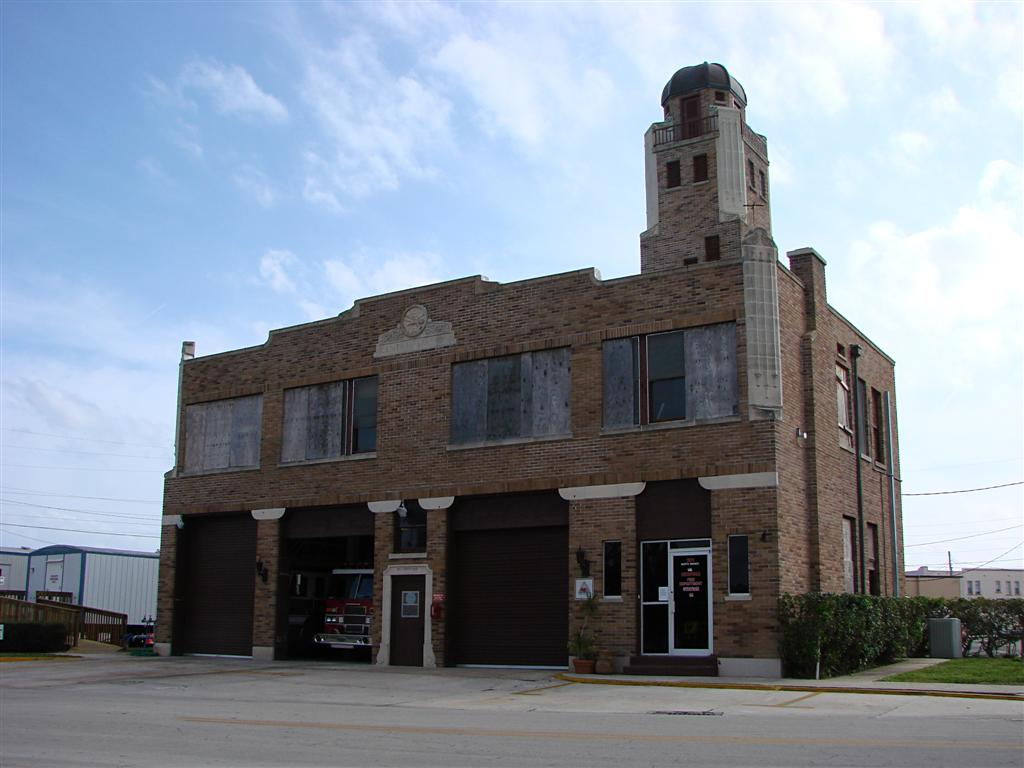

- Location within Florida Location within the United States
- Location: 301 N. Mango St., Sebring, Florida
- Coordinates: 27°29′49″N 81°26′24″W
- Built: 1927
- Architect: William J. Heim
- Architectural style: Art Deco
- MPS: Sebring MPS
- NRHP reference No.: 89001009
- Added to NRHP: 14 August 14, 1989

The Central Station (also known as the Sebring Fire Station) is a historic site in Sebring, Florida, United States. It is located at 301 North Mango Street. The architect was William J Heim and it was built in 1927. It is an example of Art Deco style. On August 14, 1989, it was added to the U.S. National Register of Historic Places.
