= Harder Hall =

Historic hotel building in U.S. state of Florida built in 1927

- U.S. National Register of Historic Places
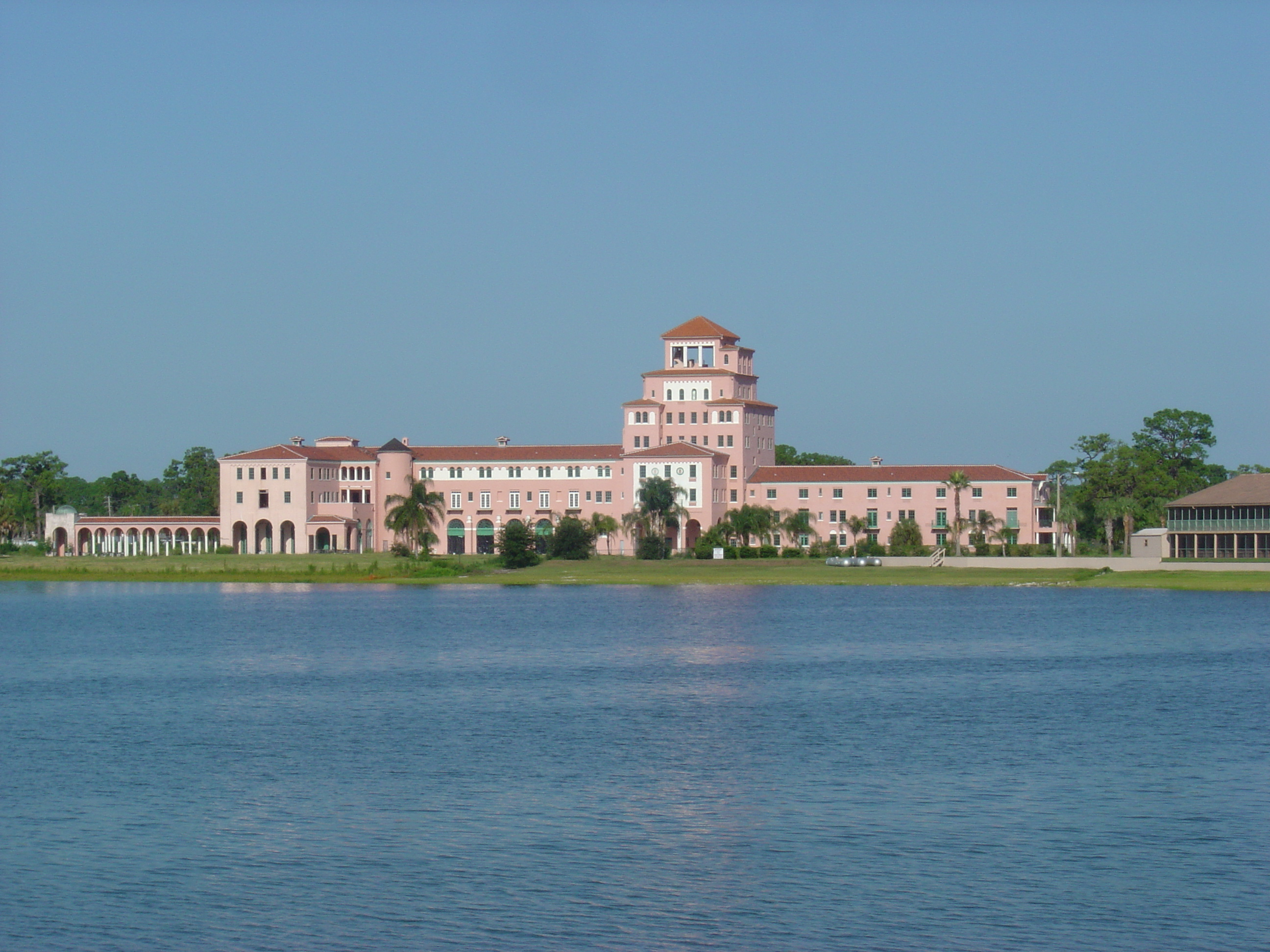
- Harder Hall
- Location: 3300 Golfview Dr., Sebring, Florida
- Coordinates: 27°28′11″N 81°28′3″W
- Area: 12.5 acres (5.1 ha)
- Built: 1925
- Architect: William Manly King
- Architectural style: Spanish Colonial Revival
- MPS: Sebring MPS
- NRHP reference No.: 90000341
- Added to NRHP: 20 June 1990

Harder Hall is a historic former hotel building in Sebring, Florida. It is located on Lake Jackson, at 3300 Golfview Drive. It was regarded as one of the "Grande Dame hotels of Florida", until its closing in 1986. The hotel was designed by renowned Palm Beach architect William Manly King, and was considered the social center of Sebring. On June 20, 1990, it was added to the U.S. National Register of Historic Places.

In late 2022 former St. Petersburg City Council Member Robert G. Blackmon purchased the hotel for 4 million dollars.

== History ==
=== Construction ===
Vincent S. Hall acquired 2000 acres on Little Lake Jackson for construction of a resort to be part of the Biltmore Hotel chain. Hall, who was also involved in the Miami Biltmore Hotel, partnered with Lewis Harder to make the plan a reality. Billed as "the Coral Gables of Central Florida", the resort was designed in the Spanish Colonial Revival Style architecture popular during the period and contained 200 rooms, with a length of 630 feet and a height of 160 feet. It had approximately 50,000 square feet (4,600 m^{2}) square feet of rooms and halls, 35,000 square feet (3,300 m^{2}) of public areas including a mezzanine lobby. The 4,200-square-foot (390 m^{2}) great room and banquet room both had 22-foot (7 m) ceilings with large french doors that overlook the lake.

"Harder Hall" was named for its developers, Lewis F. Harder and Vincent Hall, both of West Palm Beach. Construction of the resort began in 1925, prior to the end of the Florida land boom of the 1920s. The firm responsible for the construction of the building, Schultze and Weaver, were also responsible for the Biltmore Hotel in Coral Gables, Florida. In 1927, before opening, Harder and Hall went bankrupt on the project; it was then purchased by a group including US Congressman Edgar Raymond Kiess, with Vincent Hall returning as resident manager. On January 21, 1928, the classic Spanish Style hotel and golf resort opened on the shore of Little Lake Jackson.

=== Operation ===
From the start, Harder Hall was heralded as "a high class hotel that has been called the finest in Florida" where "the highest types of society gather for balls and social events of the exclusive set". Featured hotel activities included golfing, tennis, boating, swimming, fishing, hunting, horseback riding, and more. Department store magnate S. S. Kresge spent his honeymoon at the resort, while Statler Hotel founder Ellsworth Milton Statler spent winters there.

Novelist Rex Beach lived at the hotel for a period in the 1920s. Beach's brother in law, famed comedian Fred Stone, made national headlines when he went golfing at the resort in 1929, his first public outing without crutches since he had been injured in a plane crash the year before.

A number of notable performers appeared at the hotel over the years, including actress Vilma Ebsen

It greatly benefitted from its proximity to the Sebring International Raceway and was the hotel of choice for many of the affluent drivers who competed in the 12 Hours of Sebring race, and of the celebrities and who attended the festivities. The resort hosted many pre and post race parties, as well as award banquets. Harder Hall "virtually always has been Sebring race headquarters, if not officially, unofficially, and surely socially"

Famous guests included actor Steve McQueen, Peter Revson, Dan Gurney Mario Andretti, Count Alfonso de Portago, Briggs Cunningham, Paul Newman, Jim Garner, Dick Smothers, and Bruce Jenner. In 1984, Driver Hurley Haywood remarked "I love pink old Harder Hall. . .I still stay there. I love the quaintness of Sebring".

In the 30s, Walter Hagen faced off against Joe Kirkwood in an exhibition match at the resort, with Rube Walberg and novelist Rex Beach pairing off for their own round. In the 1960s, golf stars Cary Middlecoff and Jim Ferree faced off in a televised "World Championship Golf" match.

From 1960-1964 the resort played host to the annual Haig & Haig Scotch Foursome, which eventually became known as the JCPenney Classic. In 2000 the tournament was replaced by the Valspar Championship, now held annually at the Innisbrook Resort and Golf Club.

In October 1986, the LPGA Futures Tour established its home base at the resort, with the hotel serving as host to a number of LPGA tournaments over the years including the long-running Harder Hall Women's Invitational

The resort also featured 12 tennis courts and a tennis clubhouse and pro shop. In the 1970s, Dennis Van der Meer held a “tennis university” at the property.
