= Highlands County Courthouse =

- U.S. National Register of Historic Places
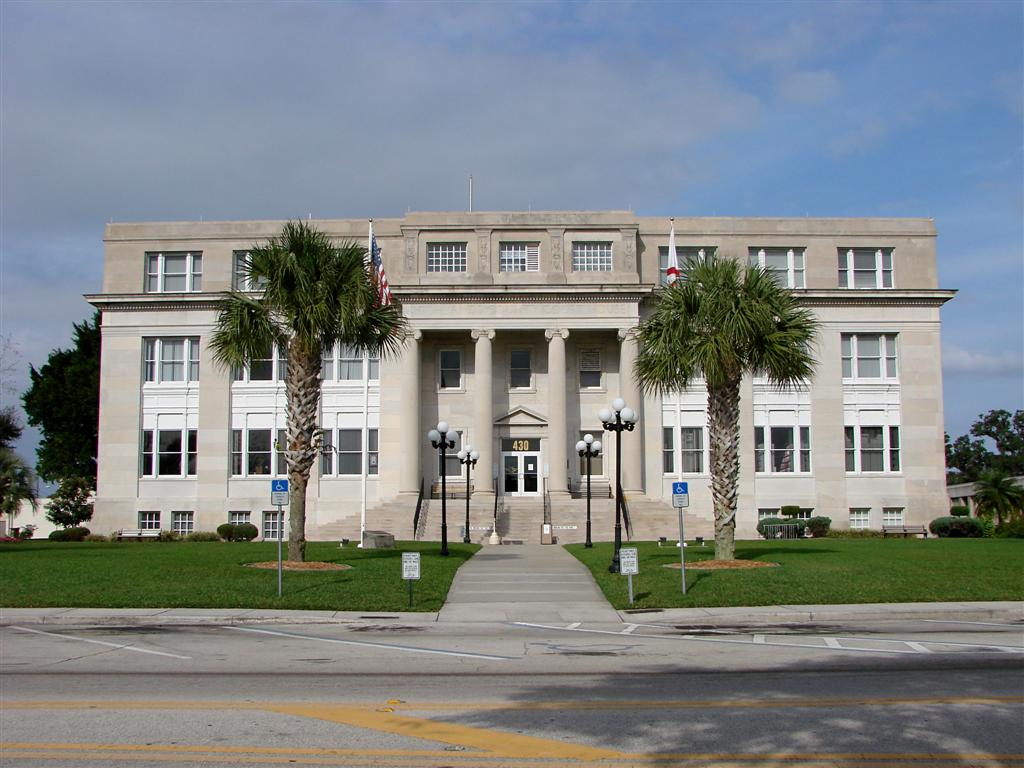

- Location within Florida Location within the United States
- Interactive map showing the location of Highlands County Courthouse
- Location: 430 S. Commerce Ave., Sebring, Florida
- Coordinates: 27°29′33″N 81°26′14″W
- Area: 3 acres (1.2 ha)
- Built: 1926
- Architect: Fred Bishop
- Architectural style: Classical Revival
- MPS: Sebring MPS
- NRHP reference No.: 89001013
- Added to NRHP: August 14, 1989

The Highlands County Courthouse (constructed in 1927) is a historic U.S. courthouse in Sebring, Florida. It is located at 430 South Commerce Avenue. On August 14, 1989, it was added to the U.S. National Register of Historic Places.
