= Paul L. Vinson House =

Historic house in Florida, United States

- U.S. National Register of Historic Places
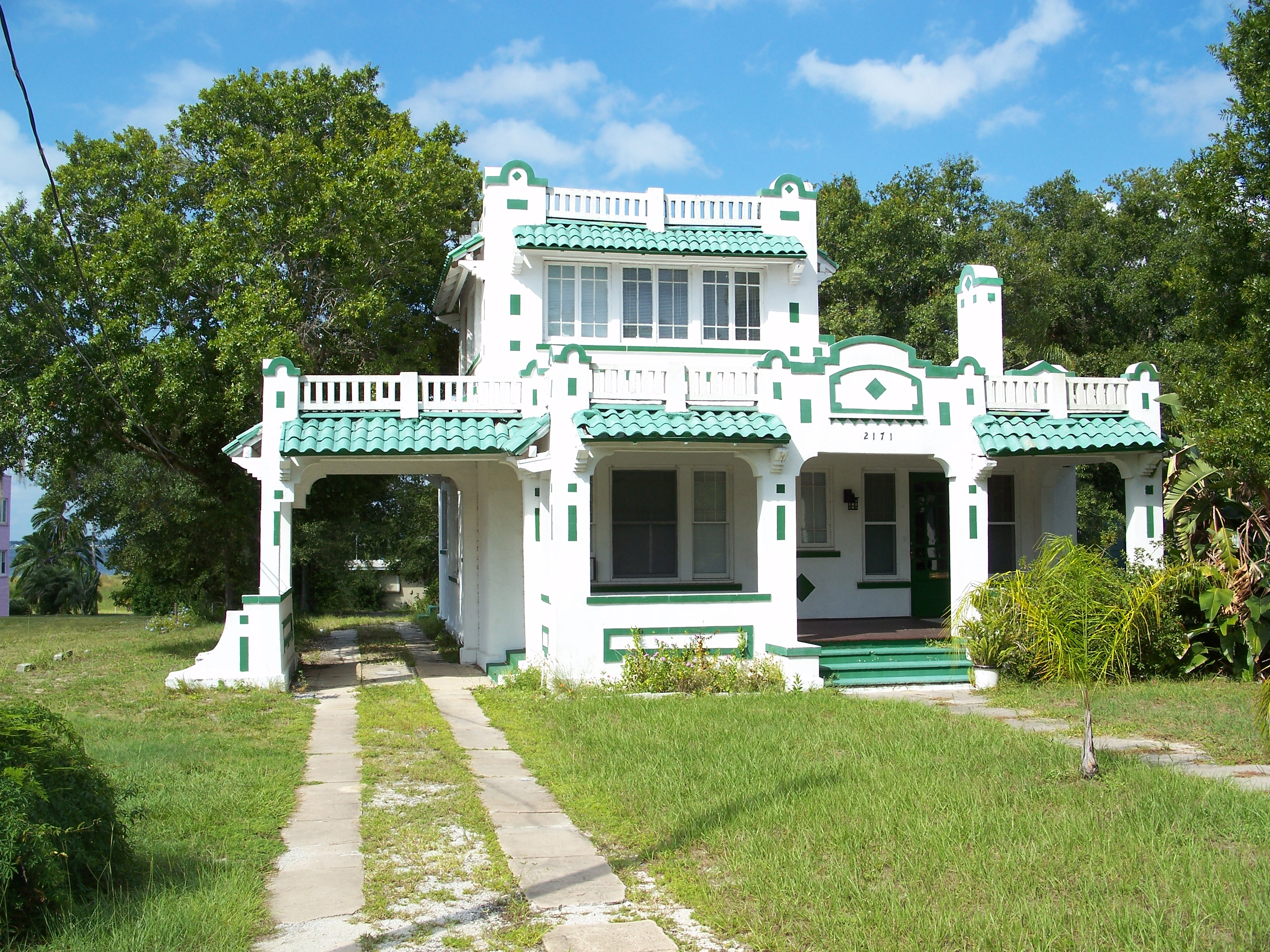

- Location within Florida Location within the United States
- Location: 2171 N. Lake View Dr., Sebring, Florida
- Coordinates: 27.4972°N 81.4448°W
- Area: 2 acres (0.81 ha)
- Built: 1920
- Architectural style: Mission/Spanish Revival
- MPS: Sebring MPS
- NRHP reference No.: 89001011
- Added to NRHP: August 14, 1989

The Paul L. Vinson House is a historic house located in Sebring, Florida. It is locally significant as a rare, highly distinctive example of Mission Revival style architecture.

== Description and history ==
The two-story Mission Revival style house was completed in 1920. It was originally built for Paul L. Vinson, a local plumbing contractor. It was added to the National Register of Historic Places on August 14, 1989.
