= Edward Hainz House =

Historic house in Florida, United States

- Edward L. Hainz House
- U.S. National Register of Historic Places
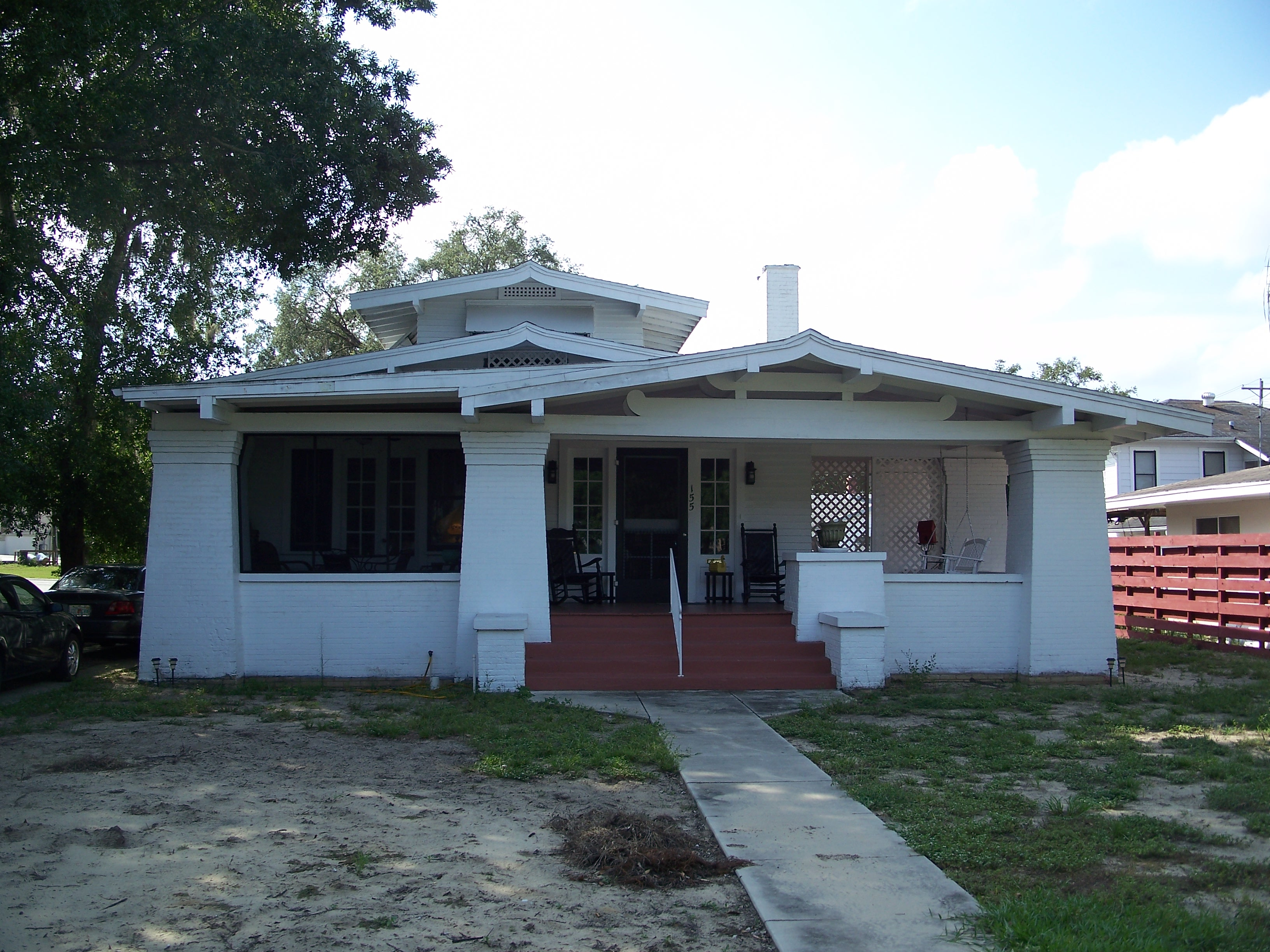

- Location within Florida
- Location: 155 W. Center Ave., Sebring, Florida
- Coordinates: 27°29′41″N 81°26′32″W
- Area: less than one acre
- Built: 1919
- Architectural style: Japanese Bungalow
- MPS: Sebring MPS
- NRHP reference No.: 89001010
- Added to NRHP: August 14, 1989

The Edward L. Hainz House (nicknamed Linger Longer) is a historic house located at 155 West Center Avenue in Sebring, Florida.

== Description and history ==
The house has three low pitched gable roofs with exposed rafters, tails and purlins. The roof has two interior brick chimneys on the west side. The main facade is fronted by the staggered roof lines and the oversized battered posts at the recessed front porch. A central multi-pane entrance is flanked by ten pane side lights. It has clapboard and rolled composition roofing. Fenestration on the main block is regular 1/1 double hung woodsash. The partial second story contains a three double casement wood sashes with a common surround.

It was added to the National Register of Historic Places on August 14, 1989.
