= H. Orvel Sebring House =

Historic house in Florida, United States

- U.S. National Register of Historic Places
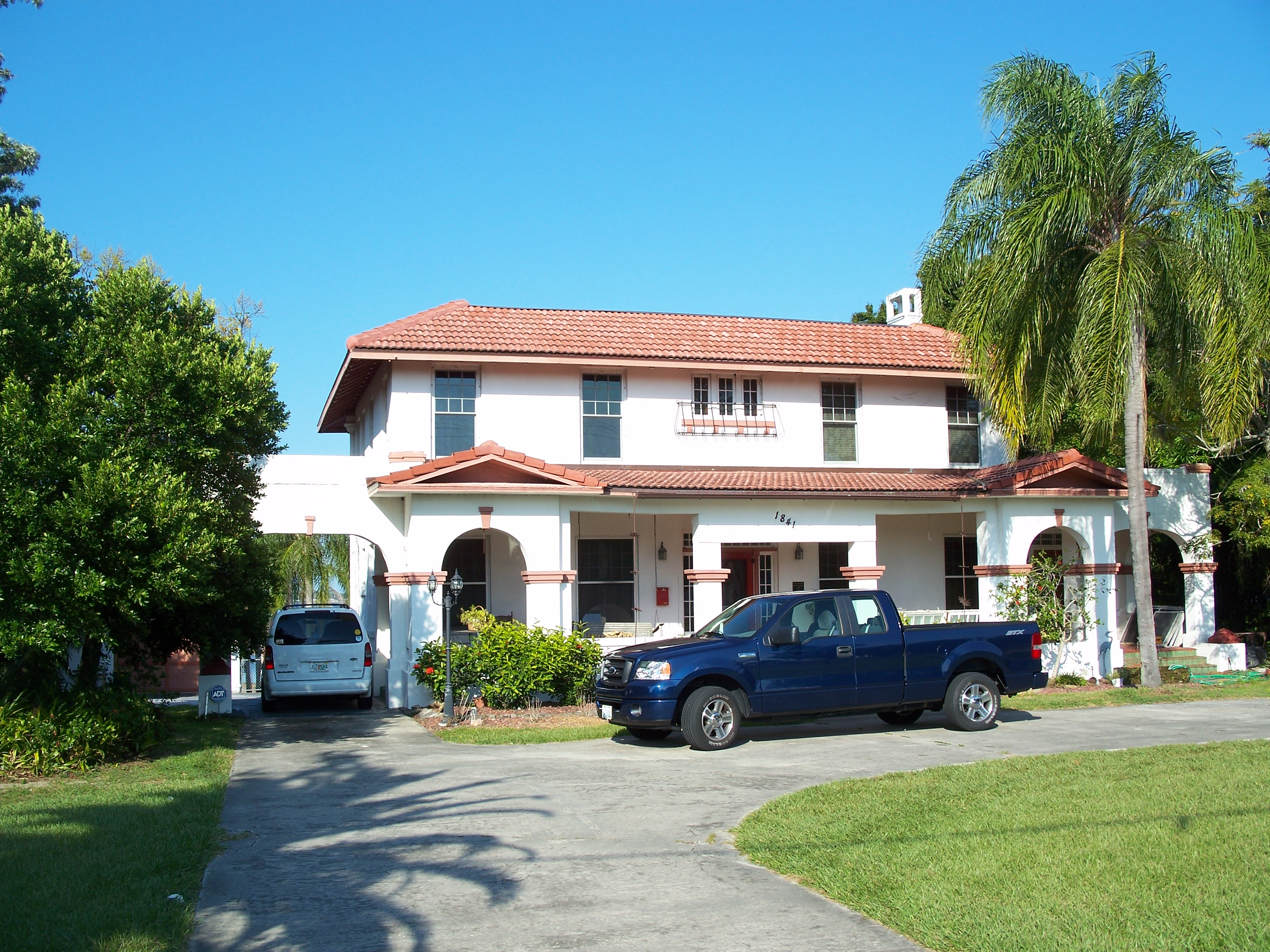

- Location within Florida Location within the United States
- Location: 1841 Lake View Dr., Sebring, Florida
- Coordinates: 27°29′22″N 81°26′32″W
- Area: 2 acres (0.81 ha)
- Architectural style: Mission/Spanish Revival
- MPS: Sebring MPS
- NRHP reference No.: 89001012
- Added to NRHP: August 14, 1989

The H. Orvel Sebring House is a historic site in Sebring, Florida. It is located at 1841 Lakeview Drive. On August 14, 1989, it was added to the U.S. National Register of Historic Places.
