= Sebring, Florida =

- City
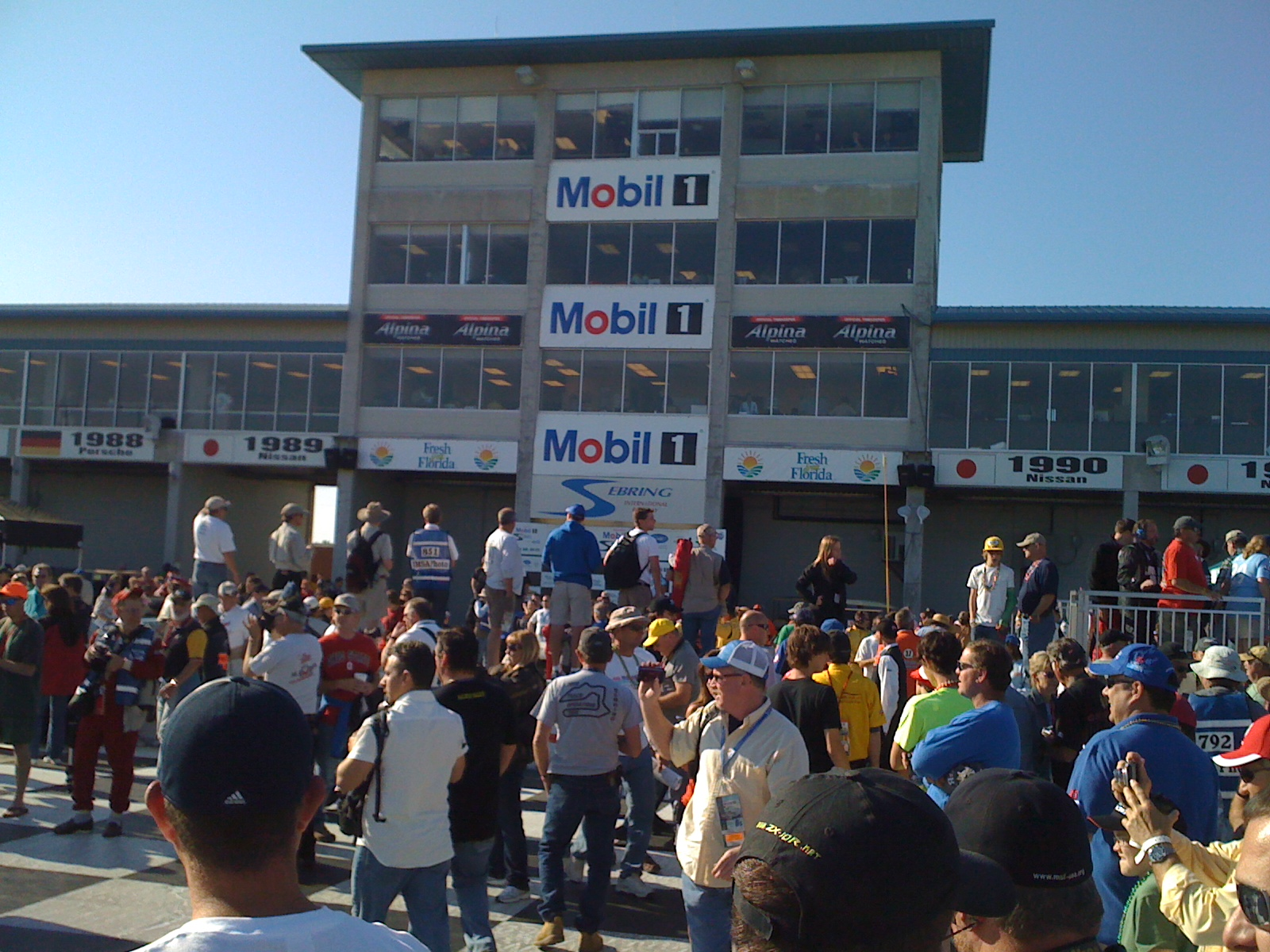
- Sebring Raceway

- Logo
- Nicknames: Hub of the Heartland; The City on the Circle; Home of 12 Hour Grand Prix
- Location in Highlands County and Florida
- Coordinates: 27°29′36″N 81°27′25″W
- Country: United States
- State: Florida
- County: Highlands
- Settled: 1912
- Incorporated (city): 1913

Government
  - Type: Council-Manager

Area
  - Total: 16.44 sq mi (42.58 km^{2})
  - Land: 10.59 sq mi (27.42 km^{2})
  - Water: 5.85 sq mi (15.16 km^{2}) 37.8%
- Elevation: 98 ft (30 m)

Population (2020)
  - Total: 10,729
  - Estimate (2022): 11,379
  - Density: 1,013/sq mi (391.3/km^{2})
- Time zone: UTC-5 (Eastern (EST))
  - Summer (DST): UTC-4 (EDT)
- ZIP codes: 33870-33872, 33875-33876
- Area code: 863
- FIPS code: 12-64875
- GNIS feature ID: 2405440
- Website: www.mysebring.com

Sebring (/ˈsiːbrɪŋ/ SEE-bring) is a city in and the county seat of Highlands County, Florida, United States. It is nicknamed "The City on the Circle", in reference to Circle Drive, the center of the Sebring Downtown Historic District. As of 2022 United States Census estimates, the population is 11,379 up from 10,729 at the 2020 census.

Sebring became a popular development and tourist destination of the 1920s, hailed as the "Coral Gables of Central Florida". Many grandiose Mediterranean buildings of that time period still exist within the city, the most notable being the Harder Hall Hotel and Resort. The broader Sebring metropolitan area had a population estimate of 105,618 in 2022; the disparity in population between the city proper and the metropolitan area is due to the relatively small size of the annexed area of the city, with most all of the landmass west of Lake Jackson technically in unincorporated Highlands County.

Sebring is centered around Lake Jackson, with the Downtown Historic District directly on the waterfront. Due to its Florida scrub terrain, Lake Jackson has natural white sand beaches, and is a popular boating and swimming destination. Sebring is the home of the Sebring International Raceway, best known as the host of the 12 Hours of Sebring, an annual WeatherTech SportsCar Championship race that attracts fans and teams from around the world. Nearby Highlands Hammock State Park is a popular attraction, and was the first state park created in Florida. The city features a large 1768-acre airfield, the Sebring Regional Airport.

== History ==
Sebring was founded in 1912. It was named after George E. Sebring (1859–1927), a pottery manufacturer from Ohio who developed the city. He had a circular plan as the focal point for the city. It was chartered by the state of Florida in 1913, and was selected as the county seat of Highlands County when the county was created in 1921. The village of Sebring, Ohio, is also named for George E. Sebring and his family.

Sebring is known for its collection of historic and historically designated buildings. The Sebring Train Station, Sebring Fire Station, and the Highlands County Courthouse are all National Register of Historic Places buildings that are still in service, as well as the entire Sebring Downtown Historic District, consisting of shops, restaurants, offices, businesses and apartments all bordered by the water. Harder Hall Resort and the Kenilworth Lodge are both surviving examples of large, extravagant boom time hotels.

=== Sebring Historical Society ===
The Sebring Historical Society is a 501(c)(3) tax-exempt organization registered in the State of Florida on 08/07/1968. The mission of the SHS is to engage individuals in protecting, educating, and sharing the history of Sebring and the surrounding area. The Society operates out of two locations: the Archives Office and the Charles F. Weigle House Museum. The Archives Office is located at 321 W. Center Avenue, Sebring, FL 33870. It is currently housed in the lower level of the Sebring Library, with the front door facing the lake side of the building. The Museum is located across a shared library parking lot at 1989 Lakeview Drive, Sebring, Florida.

=== 2019 shooting ===
On January 23, 2019, 21-year-old Sebring resident Zephen Xaver entered a SunTrust bank off of U.S. Route 27 wearing a ballistic vest under his sweatshirt and armed with a 9 mm handgun. Xaver forced five women inside to lie on the ground before fatally shooting them all. Xaver then had a 2-hour standoff with responding police before eventually agreeing to surrender, after which SWAT drove an armored vehicle through the front entrance of the bank and arrested him.

A year later, after the bank was demolished, a new park was opened up in its place called Reflection Park. The park features a pentagon shaped plaque with sunbeams from the SunTrust logo emblazoned on it, with each side of the pentagon representing a life lost in the attack.

== Geography ==
Sebring is located in northwestern Highlands County. According to the Census Bureau, the city has a total area of 16.0 square miles (41.5 km^{2}), 10.0 square miles (25.8 km^{2}) of which are land and 6.1 square miles (15.7 km^{2}) of which are water. Water comprises 37.8% of the city's total area.

The city's geography is dominated by 9,212-acre (37 km^{2}) Lake Jackson, but 420-acre (1.7 km^{2}) Dinner Lake and 137-acre (0.6 km^{2}) Little Lake Jackson are also within the city limits. Highlands County has more than 84 lakes, most of which are located in unincorporated areas of the county. Sebring lies near the southern end of the Lake Wales Ridge, a chain of ancient islands that is the native habitat for many rare plants and animals. Most of the area is rural and part of the Florida scrub ecosystem, with smaller areas of hammocks and cypress swamps, similar to those found at Highlands Hammock State Park, 4 miles (6 km) west of Sebring.

=== Climate ===
Sebring's climate is a humid subtropical climate (Köppen climate classification Cfa), with hot, humid summers and mild, dry winters. Unlike most places with a similar climate classification, Sebring's rainfall is clearly seasonal, with approximately 57 percent of the total rainfall occurring in the June–September summer period. However, the variation between the wettest and driest months does not reach the threshold required for climate classification Cwa (monsoon-influenced), which requires the wettest month to have ten times the precipitation of the driest month.

Climate data for Sebring, Florida, 1991–2020 normals, extremes 2007–present
Month	Jan	Feb	Mar	Apr	May	Jun	Jul	Aug	Sep	Oct	Nov	Dec	Year
Record high °F (°C)	88 (31)	91 (33)	94 (34)	97 (36)	100 (38)	98 (37)	97 (36)	98 (37)	96 (36)	94 (34)	91 (33)	89 (32)	100 (38)
Mean daily maximum °F (°C)	73.8 (23.2)	77.8 (25.4)	80.1 (26.7)	84.6 (29.2)	88.6 (31.4)	90.4 (32.4)	91.4 (33.0)	91.3 (32.9)	88.8 (31.6)	85.9 (29.9)	80.6 (27.0)	76.2 (24.6)	84.1 (28.9)
Daily mean °F (°C)	61.5 (16.4)	64.5 (18.1)	66.8 (19.3)	71.9 (22.2)	76.1 (24.5)	79.8 (26.6)	81.3 (27.4)	81.9 (27.7)	80.1 (26.7)	75.8 (24.3)	69.2 (20.7)	64.5 (18.1)	72.8 (22.7)
Mean daily minimum °F (°C)	49.3 (9.6)	51.3 (10.7)	53.4 (11.9)	59.3 (15.2)	63.7 (17.6)	69.2 (20.7)	71.2 (21.8)	72.5 (22.5)	71.4 (21.9)	65.7 (18.7)	57.7 (14.3)	52.8 (11.6)	61.5 (16.4)
Record low °F (°C)	20 (−7)	22 (−6)	30 (−1)	35 (2)	46 (8)	60 (16)	65 (18)	68 (20)	60 (16)	38 (3)	32 (0)	24 (−4)	20 (−7)
Average precipitation inches (mm)	1.99 (51)	2.17 (55)	2.77 (70)	2.04 (52)	4.12 (105)	9.05 (230)	8.89 (226)	8.41 (214)	6.85 (174)	2.76 (70)	1.52 (39)	1.70 (43)	52.27 (1,329)
Average precipitation days (≥ 0.01 in)	6.8	6.5	5.2	6.2	8.5	15.9	16.5	18.5	15.4	9.2	6.6	6.8	122.1
Source 1: NOAA
Source 2: National Weather Service

== Demographics ==
Historical population
Census	Pop.	Note	%±
1920	812		—
1930	2,912		258.6%
1940	3,155		8.3%
1950	5,006		58.7%
1960	6,939		38.6%
1970	7,223		4.1%
1980	8,736		20.9%
1990	8,900		1.9%
2000	9,667		8.6%
2010	10,491		8.5%
2020	10,729		2.3%
2022 (est.)	11,379	▲	6.1%
U.S. Decennial Census

Sebring is the principal city of the Sebring, Florida Metropolitan Statistical Area.

=== Racial and ethnic composition ===
Sebring racial composition (Hispanics excluded from racial categories) (NH = Non-Hispanic)
Race	Pop 2010	Pop 2020	% 2010	% 2020
White (NH)	6,802	5,848	64.84%	54.51%
Black or African American (NH)	1,466	1,572	13.97%	14.65%
Native American or Alaska Native (NH)	57	30	0.54%	0.28%
Asian (NH)	141	157	1.34%	1.46%
Pacific Islander or Native Hawaiian (NH)	2	11	0.02%	0.10%
Some other race (NH)	6	49	0.06%	0.46%
Two or more races/Multiracial (NH)	172	347	1.64%	3.23%
Hispanic or Latino (any race)	1,845	2,715	17.59%	25.31%
Total	10,491	10,729	100.00%	100.00%

=== 2020 census ===
As of the 2020 census, Sebring had a population of 10,729. The median age was 44.3 years. 20.2% of residents were under the age of 18 and 25.5% were 65 years of age or older. For every 100 females, there were 92.6 males, and for every 100 females age 18 and over, there were 90.8 males.

98.5% of residents lived in urban areas, while 1.5% lived in rural areas.

There were 4,512 households in Sebring, of which 25.8% had children under the age of 18 living in them. Of all households, 32.8% were married-couple households, 22.3% were households with a male householder and no spouse or partner present, and 36.2% were households with a female householder and no spouse or partner present. About 37.6% of all households were made up of individuals, and 20.4% had someone living alone who was 65 years of age or older.

There were 2,122 families residing in the city.

There were 5,563 housing units, of which 18.9% were vacant. The homeowner vacancy rate was 3.5%, and the rental vacancy rate was 12.6%.

=== 2010 census ===
As of the 2010 United States census, there were 10,491 people, 4,430 households, and 2,362 families residing in the city.

=== 2000 census ===
As of the census of 2000, there were 9,668 people, 3,969 households, and 2,305 families residing in the city. The population density was 1,883.7 inhabitants per square mile (727.3/km^{2}). There were 5,024 housing units at an average density of 979.0 units per square mile (378.0 units/km^{2}). The racial makeup of the city was 75.81% White, 15.69% African American, 0.57% Native American, 0.74% Asian, 0.10% Pacific Islander, 5.06% from other races, and 2.02% from two or more races. Hispanic or Latino residents of any race were 11.00% of the population.

In 2000, there were 3,969 households, out of which 23.1% had children under the age of 18 living with them, 42.0% were married couples living together, 12.0% had a female householder with no husband present, and 41.9% were non-families. 36.0% of all households were made up of individuals, and 21.0% had someone living alone who was 65 years of age or older. The average household size was 2.25 and the average family size was 2.91.

In 2000, in the city, 22.1% of the population was under the age of 18, 7.9% was from 18 to 24, 22.8% from 25 to 44, 19.4% from 45 to 64, and 27.7% was 65 years of age or older. The median age was 42 years. For every 100 females, there were 91.7 males. For every 100 females age 18 and over, there were 88.6 males.

In 2000, the median income for a household in the city is $32,607, and the average income for the city is $56,732.

As of 2000, those who spoke English only at home accounted for 89.39% of residents. Other home languages included Spanish, spoken by 10.18% of the city's residents, and French, spoken by 0.42%.

== Economy ==
The top private employers in Sebring include AdventHealth, Publix, The Results Company, Highlands Regional Medical Center (HCA), Alan Jay Automotive Network, Costa Farms, and Bowman Steel.

Sebring serves as the North, South and Central American sales and distribution center for airplane manufacturer Tecnam

French propeller manufacturer Duc Hélices has its North American headquarters located in Sebring.

== Culture and attractions ==
Sebring has a number of museums, historical and arts facilities, including the

- Children's Museum of the Highlands, located in the heart of downtown featuring interactive activities for children ages 1–12
- Charles F. Weigle House Museum, administered by the Sebring Historical Society and highlighting the history of the city and its notable residents
- Civilian Conservation Corps Museum at Highlands Hammock State Park, highlighting the history of the CCC, President Franklin D. Roosevelt's New Deal, and the history of the park
- Highlands Lakeside Theater, a waterfront performing arts center
- Highlands Museum of the Arts, a multi media arts collection
- Historical Archives, administered by the Sebring Historical Society and open to the public
- Military Sea Services Museum, containing artifacts and exhibits relating to the U.S. Coast Guard, U.S. Marines and U.S. Navy
- The Sadie Kahn Memorial Park, a small passive park downtown, was designed by renowned architect Kenneth Treister

=== Historical buildings and locations ===
- Central Station
- Sebring Downtown Historic District
- Edward Hainz House
- Elizabeth Haines House
- First National Bank Building
- Florida Medal of Honor Memorial
- H. Orvel Sebring House
- Harder Hall Hotel
- Highlands County Courthouse
- Highlands Hammock State Park
- Kenilworth Lodge
- Lakeshore Mall
- Paul L. Vinson House
- Santa Rosa Hotel
- Seaboard Air Line Passenger Station
- Sebring International Raceway
- Sebring Regional Airport
- South Florida State College

== Education ==
The School Board of Highlands County operates seven public schools drawing from the city of Sebring with a combined enrollment of approximately 6200 students; four elementary schools (Cracker Trail Elementary, Fred Wild Elementary, Sun 'n Lake Elementary, and Woodlawn Elementary serving students in kindergarten through 5th grades), two middle schools (Sebring Middle School and Hill-Gustat Middle School, serving students in 6th through 8th grades), and one high school (Sebring High School). In 2023 grades released by the Florida Department of Education, three of the elementary schools (Cracker Trail Elementary School, Woodlawn Elementary School, and Sun 'n Lake Elementary School) received "B" grades; Fred Wild Elementary School received a "C" grade. In the same report, Sebring Middle School received a "C", and Sebring High School, home of the county's sole International Baccalaureate program, received a "C" grade.

In 2021, the county's high school graduation rate was 84.4%, reflecting an increase every year over the previous 11 years

During segregation time, E. O. Douglas High School, Home of the Mighty Tigers, was located in this city for Black people throughout Highlands County. The last graduating class from this school was in 1967. After desegregation, students from E. O. Douglas transferred to schools which were formerly whites-only. The E. O. Douglas campus now houses the headquarters of the School Board of Highlands County.

== Transportation ==
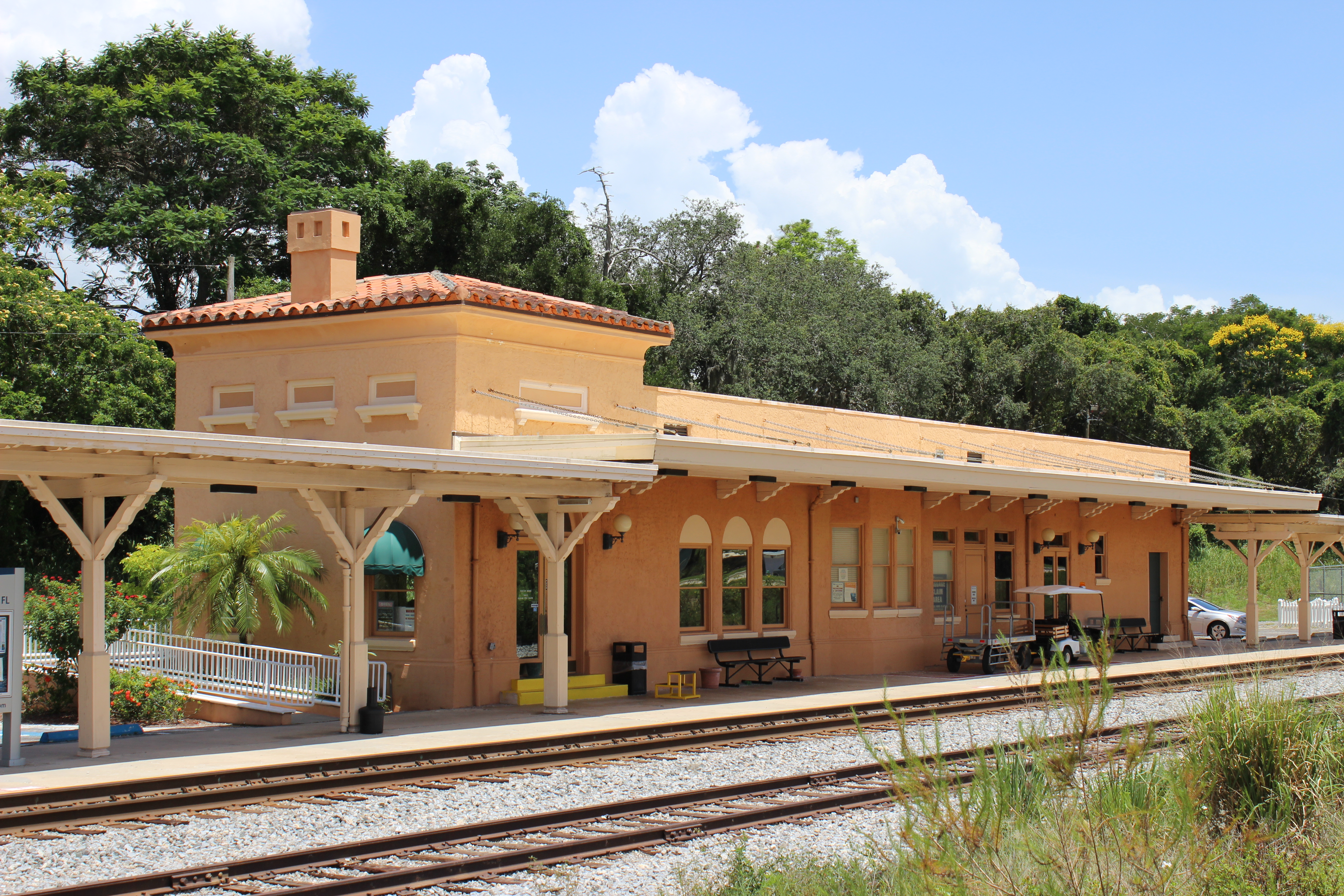
The Sebring station, served by Amtrak's Silver Meteor and Silver Star trains

U.S. Route 27 (cosigned with U.S. Route 98 in Sebring) is the major artery providing access to the rest of the state. State Road 17 begins in Sebring and heads north to its terminus in Haines City. State Road 64 (to the north) and State Road 66 (to the south) are important secondary roads. Sebring is the largest populated area in the country to not be serviced by an Interstate Highway.

Like many Florida communities, Sebring contains subdivisions containing streets with thematic continuity. In Sebring Country Estates, many thoroughfares are named after automobile manufacturers or their models, as is evident in Peugeot Street, Ferrari Drive, Porsche Avenue, Vantage Terrace, Corvette Avenue, and Thunderbird Road. In Sebring Hills, many streets bear names with an ornithological bent, including Egret Street, Ibis Avenue, and Woodpecker Boulevard. The Sun 'n Lake Sebring development is plotted with streets bearing the same names as those in the city of Coral Gables.

Sebring Regional Airport is located a few miles southeast of the city and provides general aviation facilities for Sebring. The airport is also the home of the Sebring International Raceway, the host of the 12 Hours of Sebring, second round of WeatherTech SportsCar Championship automobile race series, held annually in March. The airport has also hosted the annual US Sport Aviation Expo for eight years. The nearest regularly scheduled passenger service is provided at Orlando International Airport, 86 miles (138 km) by road to the north.

The city is served by Amtrak from the Sebring station, a depot built in 1924 by the Seaboard Air Line and listed on the National Register of Historic Places. Amtrak's daily service to Sebring consists of two trains each from the Silver Meteor and Silver Star, heading south to Miami and north to Tampa, Orlando and New York City. CSX Transportation owns the track over which Amtrak operates. The South Central Florida Express railroad connects to the CSX line in Sebring, allowing transportation of sugar from Clewiston to the rest of the country.

== Sports ==
- The major sporting event in Sebring is the annual 12 Hours of Sebring race, although the Sebring International Raceway hosts races of all types year round.
- The famed Newark Bears played their Spring Training games in Sebring in the 1930s and 1940s. The Bears, a New York Yankees minor league affiliate, began their stint in town shortly after Jacob Ruppert purchased the Yankees. The team's 1937 season in Sebring is covered in the book The 1937 Newark Bears: A Baseball Legend by Ronald A. Mayer
- Sebring is known for its golf, with its many courses comprising the Citrus Golf Trail. Courses include Sun 'N Lake Golf Club (two courses), the Country Club of Sebring, Golf Hammock Country Club, Sebring International Golf Resort and the Sebring Municipal Golf Course
- Lake Jackson hosts an annual stop on the Liqui Moly Pro Watercross Tour. In 2023, the race became the season kickoff
- The Sebring Gran Fondo is an annual 95 mile endurance professional cycling race, billed as Florida's longest and toughest
- Starting in 2021, Spartan Race and Tough Mudder joined for a combined series of events now held annually in the city
- The Highlands County Multisports Complex is a 52-acre, five field facility used for soccer, baseball, softball, and football games, events and traveling tournaments
- The Sebring Recreation Club is a shuffleboard complex in downtown Sebring, featuring both covered and open air courts. The club has hosted a number of tournaments, including the Florida State Masters
- The Highlands County Horseshoe Club features 18 blue clay courts just one block off the "Circle" in Downtown Sebring
- Boating and swimming are primary activities in and on Lake Jackson, with 3 public beaches and a public boat ramp
- Fishing is popular throughout the town, with a number of tournaments regularly held. Popular fishing destinations include Lake Jackson and Lake Istokpoga

== Media ==
=== Television ===
Sebring is located in a fringe viewing area of the Tampa-St. Petersburg television market (DMA). In addition to the primary Tampa-market television signals, local services offer signals from WFTV, the ABC affiliate in Orlando and WINK, the CBS affiliate in Fort Myers/Naples.

=== Radio ===
Sebring is the largest city in the Sebring radio market, which is ranked as the 288th largest in the United States by Arbitron. Radio stations broadcasting from Sebring include WAVP (1390AM), WWLL (105.7FM/Adult Contemporary), WITS (1340AM/Religion ), and WJCM (1050AM/ESPN). The latter three are co-owned with WWOJ (99.1FM/Country), licensed to neighboring Avon Park and WWTK (730AM/News-Talk), licensed to Lake Placid, to the south. The five stations together operate from studios in Sebring on Highway 27 near the town's northern city limit.

== Health care ==
AdventHealth Sebring and HCA Florida Highlands Hospital are the only hospitals in the city.

== Notable people ==
- Peter Argetsinger (1950–2020), race car driver and instructor
- Walt Bashore (1909–1984), Major League Baseball (MLB) player
- Rex Beach (1877–1949), 1904 Olympic water polo player, novelist, and playwright
- Bob Beaumont (1932–2011), founder of Sebring-Vanguard
- Walter Clayton Jr. (born 2003), NBA player
- Jacque Fresco (1916–2017), futurist and self-described social engineer
- Janice Gilbert (1920–1992), actress and bridge player
- Elton Gissendanner (1927–2023), Florida House of Representatives member
- Tom Gordon (born 1967), MLB player
- Bennie Gutierrez (1935–2024), polo player and Museum of Polo and Hall of Fame inductee
- Gene Harris (born 1964), MLB player
- H. Harrison Haskell (1939–1990), Pennsylvania House of Representatives member
- Fred Hawkins (1923–2014), professional golfer
- Willie Hernández (1954–2023), MLB player
- Clifton F. Hodge (1859–1949), physiologist and educator
- Sabrina Jackintell (1940–2012), glider pilot
- Douglas W. Johnson (1878–1944), geographer and geomorphologist
- Ronnie Lippett (born 1960), National Football League (NFL) player
- Howard G. Livingston (1907–1975), Florida House of Representatives member
- Patrick Mason, economist and educator
- Parker L. McDonald (1924–2017), Florida Supreme Court justice
- Ralph McGill (1950–2015), NFL player
- Thomas McGuire (1920–1945), U.S. Army Air Force fighter ace during World War II and a Medal of Honor recipient
- John Michaels (1907–1996), MLB player
- Tonya R. Moore, writer, editor, and poet
- Leslie Moser (1894–1969), college football player and coach
- Frankie Neal (born 1965), NFL player
- John Noppenberg (1917–2006), NFL player
- José Pagán (1935–2011), MLB player and coach
- Marjorie Rambeau (1889–1970), film and stage actress
- Henry C. Raven (1889–1944), naturalist
- Rebecca Sedwick (2000–2013), suicide victim
- Michael J. Seiler, real estate economist and educator
- Larry Scott (born 1977), college football player and coach
- Amanda Smith (1837–1915), Methodist preacher and former slave
- Ginger Stanley (1931–2023), model, actress, and stunt woman
- Eliot Teltscher (born 1959), professional tennis player
- Kaylee Tuck (born 1994), Florida House of Representatives member
- Cornelia Wallace (1939–2009), First Lady of Alabama
- Charles Welner (1935–2017), college football coach
- Gabe White (born 1971), MLB player
- D. J. Williams (born 1999), NFL player

== In popular culture ==
- TaylorMade golf has released a number of versions of the "Sebring" putter under their Ghost Tour line.
- Band Of Mice & Men released a song titled "Second & Sebring" named after the road; in March 2021, the RIAA certified the song Gold, the band's first certification
