= A. Wynn Howell =

American architect (1912–1989)

- Howell in 1960
- Born: Albert Wynn Howell; March 24, 1912; Elba, Alabama, US
- Died: May 31, 1989 (aged 77); Kershaw, South Carolina, US
- Occupation: Architect
- Spouse: Sara Ruth Mathews Howell (m. 1937–1961)
- Parents: Albert Lee Howell; Ethel Hildrith
- Practice: A. Wynn Howell, Lakeland, Florida
- Buildings: University Lutheran Church; St. Agnes Episcopal Church; St. Edward's Episcopal Church; Placid Tower; Rochelle Jr. & Sr. High School; Lincoln Ave. Elementary School

A. Wynn Howell (born Albert Wynn Howell; March 24, 1912 – May 31, 1989) was an architect with his own firm, A. Wynn Howell, in Lakeland, Florida, from 1952 to 1965. He became an architect via private study and a seven-year apprenticeship to three successive established architects in the central Florida area immediately after World War II. He was a member of the American Institute of Architects (AIA) from 1954 to 1967 and in 1973. He was vice-president of its Central Florida chapter during 1958–59 and president during 1960–61. He was director of the entire Florida Association of Architects during 1962–63.

His self-selected notable buildings, all in central Florida, were Rochelle Junior and Senior High School, Lakeland (1955); Saint Agnes Episcopal Church, Sebring (1959); Saint Edward's Episcopal Church, Mount Dora (1959); Lincoln Avenue Elementary School, Lakeland (1960); Placid Tower, Lake Placid (1960); and University Lutheran Church, Gainesville (1961). The last building listed, University Lutheran Church, has been selected by Envision Heritage of the University of Florida for digital preservation. In 1953, he proposed a design for the Citrus Tower in Clermont with two observation floors supported by a giant cylinder that visitors could walk up using an external spiral stairway – it was rejected. (Note: Bloodsworth, Doris (2010), Clermont, Images of America, Arcadia, p. 88, ISBN 978-0-7385-8586-4. Bloodsworth claims (p. 88) "A. Wynne Howell [sic] of Lakeland, an understudy of Frank Lloyd Wright," but Howell does not mention Wright in his short autobiography.)

Howell was born in Elba, Alabama. He retired and moved to Menlo Park, California, in 1966. He died in Kershaw, South Carolina.
