= Peace Tower (disambiguation) =

The Peace Tower is a clock tower of the Canadian Parliament buildings in Ottawa, Canada, built to commemorate the end of World War I.

Peace Tower may also refer to:

- Peace Tower (art), an art installation in Los Angeles, California in 1966 to protest the Vietnam War, recreated in New York City in 2006 to protest the Iraq War
- Imagine Peace Tower, a dedication to John Lennon from his widow Yoko Ono near Reykjavík, Iceland
- The Peace Tower located at the International Peace Garden between North Dakota, United States and Manitoba, Canada
- The Island of Ireland Peace Park in Belgium contains a Peace Tower as a memorial to Irish veterans of World War I
- Tower of Peace is one of three names used for the Lake Placid Tower in Lake Placid, Florida when it was a tourist attraction.
- Peace Tower in Hiroshima Peace Memorial Park, Hiroshima, Japan
- Peace Tower in Heiwadai Park, Miyazaki, Japan
- Peace Tower at Sennaya Square, Saint Petersburg, Russia
