= Emily Huntington =

American writer (1841–1909)

Emily Huntington (January 3, 1841 – December 5, 1909) was an American author and home economics educator. She is credited as the originator of the phrase 'kitchen-garden' which was used by early home economics groups.

== Early life ==
Huntington was born in Lebanon, Connecticut on January 3, 1841 the second of four children of Dan and Emily (Wilson) Huntington. Her father was also from Lebanon and was a dry goods merchant. Her mother was born in Jewett City, Connecticut. Emily attended Wheaton Seminary in Norton, Massachusetts from 1856 to 1858 but did not graduate. In 1872 she moved to New York City.

== Career ==
In New York she became matron of the Wilson Industrial School for Girls where she worked with poor, largely immigrant families living in the east side tenement district of the city. Concerned with her charges inability to perform even domestic tasks, she sought to make her lessons instructive and enjoyable.

Huntington took Friedrich Fröbel's concept of the kindergarten and applied it to the teaching of domestic skills in what she coined the "kitchen-garden system." Using this approach, Huntington wrote several books aimed at adults who hoped to educate their children, specifically daughters, in cooking and housekeeping skills. Books such as The Kitchen Garden; or, Object Lessons in Household Work included lesson plans and lists of materials needed to teach on a variety of household chores, as well as songs for pupils to sing while performing these chores. This method of teaching domestic skills was imitated in other books and in classes at industrial schools.

In 1880, the Kitchen-Garden Association was formed in New York, with the goal of educating the children of the "laboring classes" through Huntington's methods; classes were provided by the Association throughout New England until 1885, when it was dissolved and reformed as the Industrial Education Association, with a larger scope and mission. The organization was partially funded by philanthropist Grace Hoadley Dodge who had been a volunteer teacher with Huntington. Among the major effects of the organization were the introduction of classes in manual arts in the New York City public schools and the founding of Teachers College at Columbia University.

Huntington herself taught home economics at Wilson Industrial School for Girls, leaving in 1892 to become the superintendent of the New York Cooking School. She demonstrated her techniques at the World's Columbian Exposition in 1893. Along with Ellen Swallow Richards, she was one of the attendees invited to attend the first Lake Placid Conference on home economics in 1899. She led a session at the conference with the title "The Kitchen-Garden and the Kindergarten."

== Death ==
Emily Huntington died of arteriosclerosis in 1909 in Windham, Connecticut after a lingering illness and was buried in Yantic Cemetery in Norwich, Connecticut.

== Writings ==
- Children's Kitchen-Garden Book (1881)
- The Cooking Garden (1885)
- How to Teach Kitchen Garden (1901)
- Introductory Cooking Lessons (1901)
