= Lake Placid Club =

Social resort in upstate New York

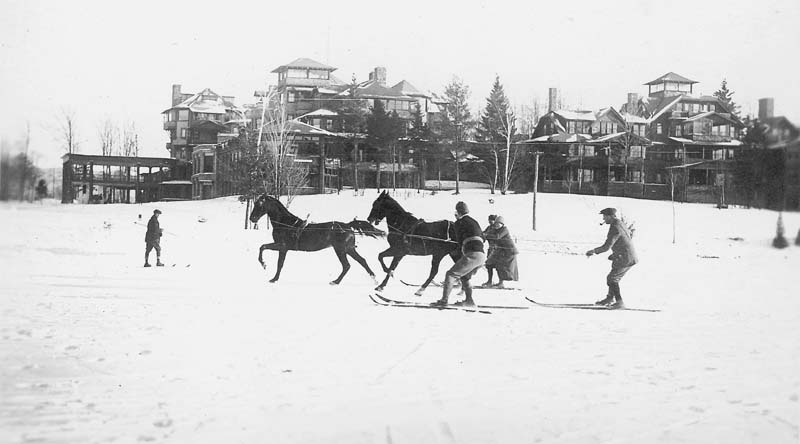
Skiers and the club's main building

The Lake Placid Club was a social and recreation club active from 1895 to 1980. Founded in a hotel on Mirror Lake in Lake Placid, New York, under Melvil Dewey's leadership and according to his ideals, it was instrumental in Lake Placid's development as an internationally known resort. The club ceased operations on March 30, 1980.

== Early years until Dewey's death (1931) ==
Dewey and his wife had been exposed to various communitarian projects in New England. They were "interested in the creation of group identity" based on Protestant Christianity, healthy nutrition, sports, the desire to deepen education over the course of a lifetime, refine aesthetics, and attain economic prosperity. The founders intended the Lake Placid Club to be a place to cultivate close friendships among men and women, as well as encourage women to participate in all aspects of the community's life. Under Melvil Dewey's leadership, it became nationally known for winter sports; it built a winter clubhouse in 1907 that allowed year-round visits to Lake Placid. In 1919, it had 1,263 members and 749 employees. By 1923, the club had grown to 9,600 acres (39 km^{2}), with 356 buildings (including 110 residences), its own chapel, theatre, library, boathouses, 21 tennis courts, seven golf courses, farms, a staff of 1,100, a fire department, and even a school, today known as Northwood School.

Starting in the late 1920s, the club hosted winter sports events like a dogsled derby, attracting top competitors like Leonhard Seppala of Fairbanks, Alaska, who won in 1929. The toboggan slides were popular, as well, receiving newspaper coverage from New York City. Alpine skiing celebrities like skier and actress Sigrid Holmquist visited and held public presentations. Figure skaters George Braakman and Ada Bauman competed there in 1924.

The Arden Outdoor Theater, built in 1907, served as the locale for performances by the Alberti Players, the Sylvan Players, and the Coburn Players. In 1924, the "Placid Club Players" were founded. The New York theater impresario John Golden served as their advisor. The Arden was also the site for annual "Indian Council Fires," which were ceremonial events based on Iroquois culture, of which Dewey was personally enamored. 1903 had seen the first Council Fires staged at the club, and these "very serious and solemn occasions for both the participants and the audience of Club members and guests" continued for nearly fifty years.

== Lake Placid Conference in Home Science ==
Early in September, 1899, trustees of the club found the time ripe to bring together those most interested in home science, or household economics. The first Lake Placid Conference took place September 19–25, 1899. The chairman of the conference, Ellen Swallow Richards, is considered to be a founder of the modern domestic science movement. The conference took place annually from 1899 to 1907.

== Education and Library Sciences ==
The club had its own school since 1905. Known today as Northwood School, it was overseen by the Lake Placid Club Education Foundation from 1925 onward. The school's historical roots are closely tied to members of the club and their families. The club's business correspondence was written in Dewey's version of Simplified English.

Dewey's prominence among librarians made the club known among leading librarians, who often held conferences there. A pioneer in library science, Katharine Sharp, spent long periods at the club and died there in 1914 after a car crash during wedding festivities.

== The years of expansion and popularity (1930s to 1960s) ==
The club had been an active center of skiing ever since the 1910s. Ski-joring as seen in the picture was one of the attractions; ski jumping, ice skating, carnivals and cross-country ski lessons were others. Melvil Dewey's son Godfrey was instrumental in bringing the Winter Olympics to Lake Placid in 1932. The club's facilities and national profile laid the foundations for Lake Placid's ability to host the Games.

Musical performances were a part of the summer program. The Boston Symphony Ensemble performed there in the summer of 1929, and in the course of the years the group developed into a seasonal sinfonietta which still performs in Lake Placid during the summers. The club's musicians were not to play jazz for customers, but could play it at events held for employees. The pianist Van Cliburn performed there.

In the 1930s, a group of students from the Yale School of Drama performed at the club's Lakeside Theater during the summer months. There had been a strong connection between Yale and the club, since many of the club's school's graduates attended Yale and even formed a "Lake Placid School Alumni" association at the New Haven university. The club was also popular among Princeton and Vassar students and alumni.

The vast facilities at Lake Placid were suited for hosting conventions and dances for an array of different groups.

== Decline and closure ==
Membership declined steadily as vacationing trends among the wealthy changed. Air travel and time constraints meant that fewer families spent the entire season at the club. In 1970, the club began opening its facilities to the public for most of the year, reserving only the period from July until Labor Day and the week between Christmas and New Year's Day as members-only. In 1976, membership privileges were dropped altogether, and the club's name was changed in 1978 to the Lake Placid Resort Hotel. These changes failed to improve the hotel's declining finances, and it was uncertain whether it would still be in operation during the 1980 Winter Olympics. The Lake Placid Olympic Organizing Committee paid for the hotel to host delegates of the International Olympic Committee and other prominent guests, and it was well-regarded by attendees. However, business immediately after the Olympics was dismal, with only 5 percent of available rooms occupied in March 1980. The hotel permanently closed on March 30, 1980. During the 1990s the club was a frequent target for arson and vandalism, suffering eight arsons in eleven months in 1992. In 1996, local hotelier Serge Lussi purchased it. Its last main buildings were demolished in January 2002, but some of the cottages, renovated, remain, along with the golf courses.

== Exclusionary policies ==
For most of its existence the Lake Placid Club excluded Jews and other minorities. A Lake Placid circular explained, "No one will be received as a member or guest against whom there is physical, moral, social or race objection, or who would be unwelcome to even a small minority." Criticism followed in the form of publications and petitions. In 1904, the New York State Board of Regents received a petition demanding Dewey's removal as State Librarian because of his personal involvement in the Lake Placid Club's policy of excluding Jews and other religious and ethnic groups. While the Regents declined to remove Dewey, they did issue a public rebuke. A number of prominent Jewish businessmen published a full-page letter to the regents in February 1905; among the signatories were Adolf Ochs of the New York Times and Abraham Abraham (founder of the department store Abraham & Straus). Dewey resigned as Librarian in the summer of 1905 and soon took up permanent residence at the club, devoting himself to its further development.

When the 1932 Winter Olympics were awarded to Lake Placid, the state of New York provided public money to build the Mt. Van Hoevenberg Olympic Bobsled Run and other facilities which were planned to become the property of the Lake Placid Club after the Olympics were over. This drew protests from Jewish organizations, which argued that a private club which engages in religious discrimination should not receive taxpayer-funded benefits. The controversy was resolved when it was agreed that the state-funded facilities would not be turned over to the club, but would remain state-owned in perpetuity.

In 1954, a New York Times article criticized the club for its refusal to admit Blacks and Jews. The B'nai B'rith Anti-Defamation League filed a complaint about the club. The dispute lasted several years (some members of the New York State Council of Mayors refused to attend a conference at the club for this reason in 1958); the league decided to drop the charges of discrimination in 1959. Representatives of the club claimed that its members were religiously motivated and therefore wished to vacation as Christians among Christians in order to "strengthen their appreciation of and attachment to Christianity." Since Dewey's time, the club had been very strict about membership, avoiding fashionable vacationers, not serving alcohol in the dining room, and only accepting guests who came recommended by other members. The criteria for membership remained intact until 1976. The management was just as strict with vetting employees or businessmen who ran shops there; Jews were not allowed.

== Lake Placid Club in Florida ==
In 1926, Dewey established a southern branch of the club in Lake Stearns, Florida; the town was renamed Lake Placid as a result. It is now owned by the South Florida District of the Church of the Nazarene, which operates it as the Lake Placid Camp and Conference Center.

Dewey made his first trip to Florida in 1926 with his wife, Annie, his son, Godfrey, and C.W. Holt. Dewey chose the "rij", a ridge located in central Florida eighty miles long, two to three miles wide, and one-hundred to three-hundred feet above most of Florida, as the perfect spot for his southern club. (The "rij" is now identified as the Lake Wales Ridge) The Consolidated Naval Storages Co., and other landowners, offered Dewey 3,048 acres of land on February 18, 1927, and an agreement was made on May 6, 1927. Dewey drafted a town charter which was passed through legislation on July 6, 1927, and signed by Gov. John W. Martin, which defined the borders, approved name changes for the town, lakes, and rivers, and provided for its government. The town name was changed from Lake Stearns to Lake Placid and the Lake Stearns became Lake June-in-Winter and Lake Childs became Lake Placid. A three-story building was constructed consisting of sixty-eight rooms and situated two blocks from the Atlantic Coast Line Railway station and was called Club "Loj" which opened on December 1, 1927, and hosted Dewey's 76th birthday on December 16, 1927.

Features of Club Loj included a $12,500 firetruck and a 100,000-gallon water tank; each room had two exits, and a night watchman made routine patrols. The kitchen and entertainment were spared no expense, with offerings including tennis and various watersports. The second year of operation added a ten-car garage and a golf course, and the water works throughout the club was completed. In the third year, four new buildings, Litlloj, Lyvok (Live Oak), Lakehouse, and Easthouse, began construction and the road to town was paved, and a special train car called "Lake Placid" was added to the Atlantic Coast Line. In year five, the largest building, Club Loj, was closed to save money.

Dewey died on December 26, 1931, in the Litlloj building. The Florida Club was in operation until 1942, and was sold at public auction on October 17, 1942, by order of the Circuit Court of Florida to pay off the mortgage.

== Bibliography ==
- Ackerman, David H.: Lake Placid Club: An Illustrated History: 1895-1980. Lake Placid Education Foundation, 1998. ISBN 0-9665875-0-2.
- Stansfield, Dean: Images of America. Lake Placid. Charleston, N.C.: Arcadia Publishing, 2002. ISBN 0-7385-1051-3.
- Stedman, Irving L.: Lake Placid Club. Fulton, N.Y.: Morrill Press, 1924
