= Kitchen Garden Association =

American organization

- Successor: Industrial Education Association
- Formation: April 1880
- Founded at: New York City
- Dissolved: March 21, 1884
- Type: Nonprofit
- Purpose: Home economics education
- Origins: The "kitchen-garden" concept developed by Emily Huntington
- Services: Educational and practical philanthropy
- Key people: Grace Hoadley Dodge

The Kitchen Garden Association (sometimes spelled Kitchen-Garden Association; reorganized as the Industrial Education Association; 1880–1884) was an American organization established in New York City in April 1880, and disbanded on March 21, 1884. The growth of the association work was based on the development of an idea, the "kitchen-garden", by Emily Huntington, who published a book on the subject in 1878. By 'kitchen-garden', Huntington denoted an application of some details of Friedrich Fröbel 's kindergarten system to domestic service. Designed for girls, the 'kitchen-garden system' was part educational and part practical philanthropy.

The association was formed to promote the teaching of "industrial domestic arts", and in its first season, enrolled 80 active members from different cities, supervised the instruction of 999 children in and near New York City, and formed classes in the west and south. The teaching methods were modified and adapted to meet the requirements of Native Americans, African Americans, and Alaska Natives, as well as the children in India and Japan.

Four years after its establishment, the Kitchen Garden Association, realizing that the field in which it had begun must be more and more widely extended, reorganized as the "Industrial Education Association" (also known as the "Industrial Education Association of New York City"). The work of the Industrial Education Association led to the Teachers' College of New York City and the Burham Industrial Farm, which it founded, as well as institutions such as Pratt, Drexel, and Armour institutes. The addition of vacation schools, kindergartens, sewing classes, and manual-training high schools to the public school system also followed the impulse given by its efforts.

== Concept ==
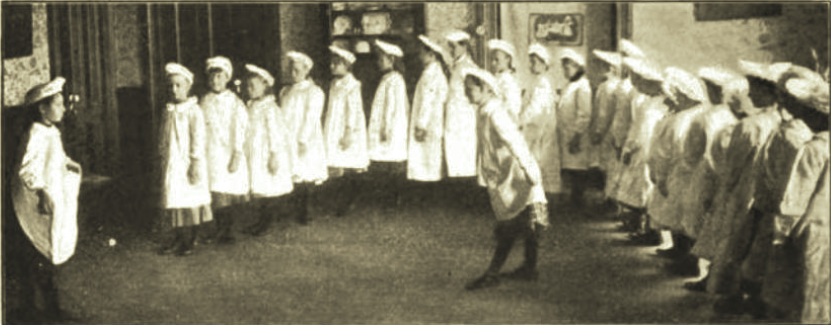
Kitchen Garden Association class

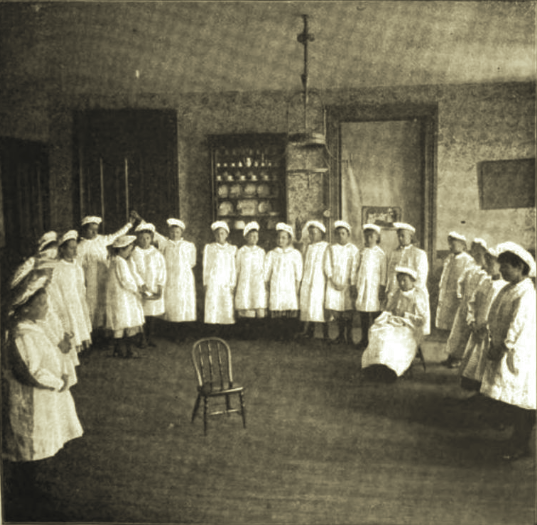
KGA class

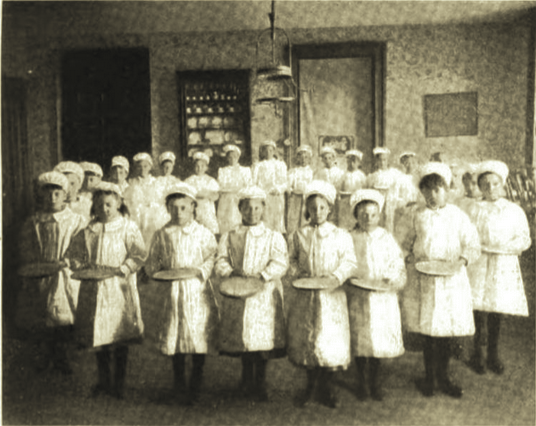
KGA class

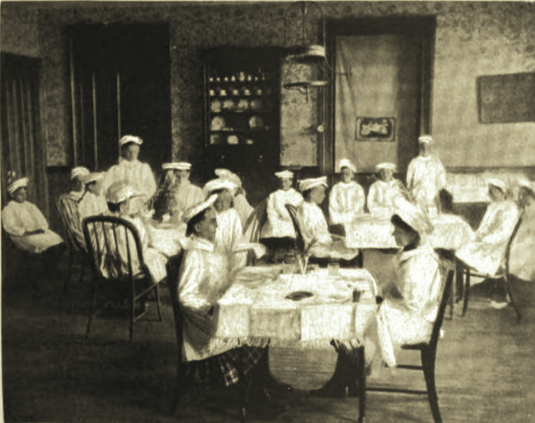
KGA class

The first kitchen-garden was the invention, or discovery, of Emily Huntington, who came to take charge of a mission school for girls on the East Side of New York. She had lived among the thrifty, capable housewives of New England, and the ignorance of her new neighbors in all household ways seemed pitiful to her. The girls who came to the mission school all had to help at home, yet when called into the mission kitchen, they did not even know how to peel a potato properly. The new head of the mission could not bear the thought of their growing up to know no more than the housekeeping of their mothers.

Observing the neglected condition of the many children, and the absence of any possible opportunity for their domestic training, the idea suggested adopting the kindergarten methods, which had proved so successful in the training of very young children, to convey practical instruction in all domestic duties. Developing this idea into a complete system of progressive training lessons, using songs and employments in the use of all kinds of small copies of the implements and utensils used in housekeeping, Huntington began her classes in 1877. Six lesson courses of "Occupations", comprising the several kinds of work essential to good housekeeping, were arranged, each course requiring a month's instruction. To these programs, the name "Kitchen Garden" was given as like to, yet distinctive from, "Kindergarten".

There were eleven places in New York City where the "kitchen-garden" system was being taught. The Wilson Industrial School for Girls, 125 St. Mark's Place, was where the system originated in 1876. At first it was taught slowly, lesson by lesson, as ideas were developed by Huntington. In 1877, 35 young women volunteered to teach, there were classes morning and afternoon, and nearly 200 children weekly were taught. In 1878, there were only morning classes and a proportionate number of children taught. In 1879, a class of 24 children came daily for an hour and a half, a different lesson being taught every day, as in kindergarten, having its molding, pricking, and dishwashing days. This last experiment proved the best, the same plan was carried out the following year. Many of the children taught in 1876 and 1877 reported commendation from employers.

Classes were also reported in Spuyten Duyvil, Hoboken, Brooklyn, Boston, Philadelphia, and Chicago, while in Providence, in Troy, and in Belfast, Ireland, classes of women instructed in the new system were also reported. Starting simultaneously from so many centers, the knowledge of the new methods was rapidly diffused.

== Establishment ==
In January 1880, a number of women in New York City interested in the kitchen-garden system united in the formation of the Kitchen Garden Association. Subsequently, the Association elected its officers and board of managers, drew up its constitution and by-laws, and was duly incorporated on April 2, 1880, under the "Act for the incorporation of benevolent, charitable, scientific, and missionary purposes."

The first year's officers were: President, Mrs. Sam P. Blagden; Vice-president, Mrs. John Sinclair; Secretary and Treasurer, Miss Elizabeth M. Thomson; Corresponding Secretary, Miss Grace H. Dodge. A Board of Managers was formed as well as an Advisory Committee, Committee on Nominations, Committee on Occupation Materials, and Committee on Printing.

== Objectives ==
The objectives of the association were:

1. To secure the wide and correct diffusion of the principles upon which the system is based.
2. To prevent its degenerating into a careless and erratic method of teaching.
3. To promote uniformity of action in all Kitchen Garden schools.
4. To establish a place of reference and for consultation with those interested in the system.
5. To assure its perpetuation.

== Instruction ==
The kitchen-garden lessons were very simple. They included how to make beds and take care of sleeping rooms, set and wait on tables, wash and iron clothes, care for a baby and the nursery, build fires, clean lamps, sweep and dust, instruction in house-cleaning, marketing, and the care of the person—all taught by miniature utensils to the accompaniment of songs and exercises, which gave enthusiasm and variety to the work. the training of the kitchen-garden teacher wsa not difficult, and young women in any community, by a few lessons as to the methods and a study of kitchen-garden literature, could soon become efficient.

== History ==
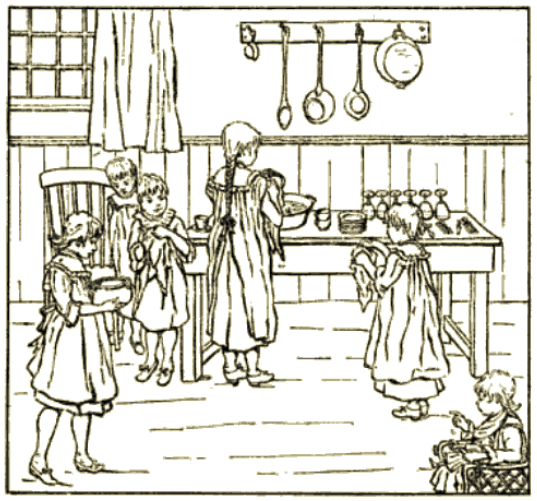
The Kitchen Garden (Cincinnati Kitchen Garden Association, 1883)

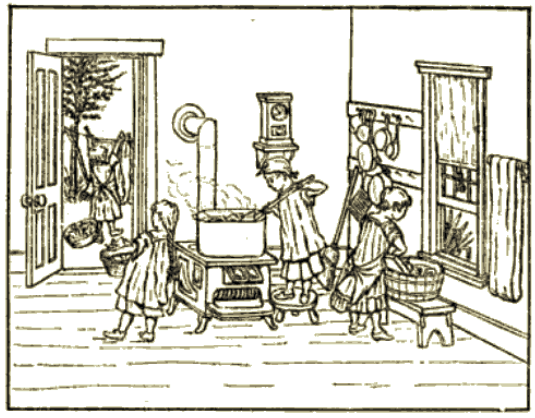
The Kitchen Garden (1883)

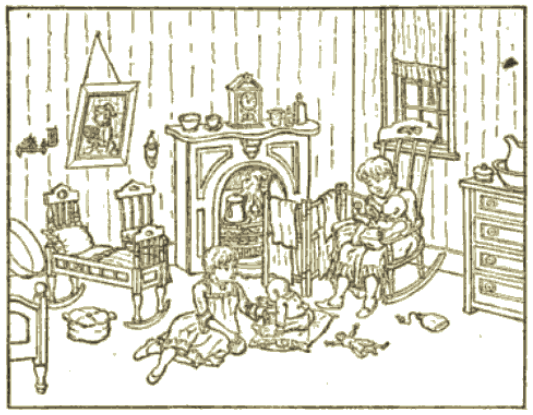
The Kitchen Garden (1883)

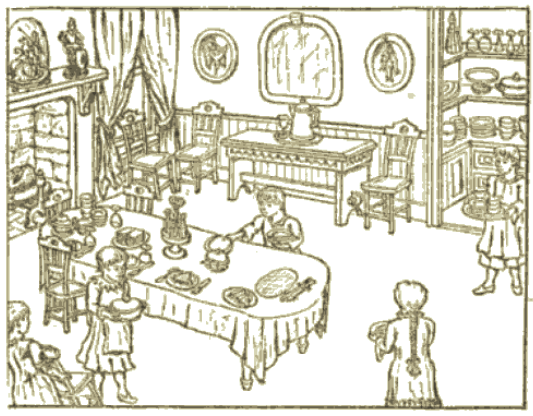
The Kitchen Garden (1883)

=== 1880 ===
Huntington established and continued Normal Classes to train young women who wanted to teach children in kitchen-garden. These Normal Classes began November 3, 1880, and lessons once a month were given for the following six months, at 125 St. Mark's Place, New York City. Huntington trained her associate, Miss Torrey, who would go to other cities; she alone was authorized to teach normal classes.

During the first year, there were 29 classes, comprising 999 children, in New York and its vicinity alone. These were taught by volunteer women teachers, except for two or three who received salaries and devoted their time to teaching the system. Classes in some 15 cities and towns were reported. The system was introduced among African Americans. Huntington had been to Hampton Institute (now Hampton University), Hampton, Virginia, and trained two of the teachers, as well as the graduating class there. From Hampton, it was hoped and expected that the kitchen-garden would spread, not only among the African Americans of the South, but also that it would also be successfully carried to Native Americans.

The system was also translated and carried to Bombay, India. England was becoming interested in the movement. The London Good Words had in it an article about the kitchen-garden system.

=== 1881 ===
The association was convinced of the value of the application, and in its first annual report, made in May 1881, was able to state that during the year, the principles of the kitchen-garden had been applied in 29 classes, comprising 999 children in New York City and vicinity alone. Many other cities followed New York's example, and similar classes were reported as existing in Brooklyn, Philadelphia, Boston, Albany, Troy, St. Louis, Cincinnati, Wilkes-Barre, Meadeville, Newark, Poughkeepsie, Elmira, and Newport. In this initial report, the same note was sounded that was shared again in the association's last report of 1884. It was that too much stress could not be laid upon the importance of training teachers for this work. Persons must not be permitted to take it up without adequate preparation. In thus insisting on professional training for teachers, the association, in the earliest days of its history, placed itself upon an educational plane and made its future successful development possible.

=== 1882 ===
The Second Annual Report, dated May 1, 1882, added, as a motto, on the title page of this Bible text: "She looketh well to the ways of her household". One or two points of advance were chronicled. The kitchen-garden classes continued in all the cities where they had previously been introduced, and new classes were established in Orange, Rochester, Yonkers, St. Albans, Cedar Rapids, Germantown, Chestnut Hill, and Cleveland. A normal class was started and was meeting with good success.

The special work in New York of the association was the engaging of teachers and the overseeing of kitchen-garden classes. During the first two years, a room was rented from the New York Cooking School, and here classes were held, composed of girls taken from the city grammar schools. The association teacher also was engaged by several institutions to teach classes.

A graduate of the normal class had attempted an extension of the system so that it would suit boys and girls. While this extension had not been developed, progress was reported nonetheless. An outgrowth of the kitchen-garden was the adapting of its principles by Mrs. Briant (a graduate of the Normal Class) to a system for instructing young boys in the elements of agricultural pursuits. They were taught, by using a large box of earth to work in, and using miniature plows, harrows, rakes, and hoes, the processes of preparing the ground, sowing the seed, caring for it, gathering in the crops, taking the corn or wheat to the mill, grinding it, and finally leaving it in the kitchen for the women to turn into bread. These were all carried out by the young boys in detail, accompanied by a question-and-answer dialogue among themselves, and by either farmers' songs or whistling to a piano accompaniment. The system was not fully developed in its first year, but it was hoped that it would grow into a valuable part of a boy's education. It operated at the Children's Aid Society Industrial School, 208 West Eighteenth Street, New York City.

=== 1883 ===
The system during these years spread not only in different parts of the U.S. but also in Europe and other quarters of the world. The system was introduced and classes were taught in many cities in almost every State of the Union. Cincinnati issued a monthly Kitchen Garden journal, with good circulation. At Cedar Rapids, Iowa, in a building being built to be devoted to industrial training, there was to be a large room given up exclusively to kitchen-garden. At Hampton, Virginia, the classes were carried on at the Butler's School, connected with the institution. In England, the interest increased and the system slowly gained headway. The Twenty-fifth Annual Report of the Ladies' Sanitary Association of London gave four pages of description of the system. The toys and books associated with the learnings were used in France. The latter were introduced in Italy and Greece. In India, Japan, and China, the missionaries were using parts of the system, and it was so well known by then that missionaries from other quarters, as they came to New York, wanted to study its principles so that they could adapt it to their work.

=== 1884 ===
The fourth report marked a significant stage in the association's development.— The association had been successful in carrying out the first, fourth, and fifth objectives, but found how impossible it was to prevent careless and erratic methods of teaching or to promote uniformity of action in all kitchen-garden schools. In addition, the board of managers felt that the Association should undertake new and enlarged work. Several unexpected fields for labor opened up, but could not be entered upon with the present constitution.

This feeling found expression in a resolution passed on March 21, 1884, which read as follows:—

Resolved, that at the next regular meeting of the association the subject of the dissolving of the kitchen-garden association, with a view of re-organizing under a different name and upon a broader basis, be presented, and action taken thereon. It is proposed to make this change because, first, the title "Kitchen-garden association" is too limited in its scope; second, experience has proved that a more advanced work in addition is essential; third, it is desirable that industrial training for schools in general, for older pupils, and for boys, be added to the present work; fourth, other systems having been developed, it seems advisable to incorporate them with our own."

In this dissolution, the old association was not entirely displaced by the new, but it was relegated to a subordinate position. A standing committee on kitchen-garden was provided for, and to it the direction of that work was dedicated. The result of the reorganization was the establishment of the Industrial Education Association.

== Publications ==
Arrangements were early made with the educational publishers J. W. Schermerhorn & Co. for supplying the material –furniture, dishes, and implements in sizes suitable for the use of children– needed for this novel instruction. The handbooks prepared by Huntington were also published by this firm.

From the first, the managers of this association understood the value of the printing press as a means of dissemination. Their free use of printed matter may be attributed, to a great degree, to the rapid growth and varied development of their work. This Second Annual Report closed with the announcement of the forthcoming issue by Ivison, Blakeman & Co. of a new volume on "Household Economy", for use in both public and private schools. It treated not only the different departments of the household, but also hygiene, emergencies, care of the sick, dress, economies, and amenities.

In addition to Household Economy, a Manual for Schools, a second handbook, Advanced Lessons and Songs, was published and used by kitchen-garden teachers.

== Notable people ==
- Emily Huntington, founder of the "kitchen-garden" concept
- Grace Hoadley Dodge (1856–1914), American philanthropist who was instrumental in the establishment of the association
