= Lake Placid High School =

Public high school in Florida, U.S.

Location
- 202 Green Dragon Drive; Lake Placid, Florida; United States
- Coordinates: 27°17′36″N 81°22′21″W

Information
- Type: Public
- Motto: "Empowering the Leaders of Tomorrow"
- Established: 1901
- School district: Highlands County Schools
- NCES School ID: 120084000907
- Principal: Kevin Tunning
- Faculty: 53 (on FTE basis)
- Grades: 9 to 12
- Enrollment: 829 (2023-24)
- Student to teacher ratio: 15.6
- Colors: Green and White
- Mascot: Dragons
- Website: https://lph.highlands.k12.fl.us/

Lake Placid High School is a public high school located in Lake Placid, Florida. It is operated by the School Board of Highlands County, the local public school district for Highlands County.

Lake Placid High School is ranked 436 of 647 traditional high schools in Florida. LPH offers students the choice of several Advanced Placement courses and exams. The AP participation rate at this school is 42%. Elective course offerings include Agriculture, Art, AVID, Building Trades and Construction, Business, Ceramics, Culinary, Digital Design, Intro to Guitar, Intro to Teaching, JROTC and Spanish.

Lake Placid High School is 1 of 3 traditional public high schools in Highlands County. The school is located in the town of Lake Placid in rural south-central Florida, commonly referred to as the Florida Heartland. The school and town limits are surrounded by orange groves and caladium farms. The enrollment zone for Lake Placid High School consists of over 450 square miles of rural southern Highlands County including the town of Lake Placid and the unincorporated communities of Placid Lakes, Sylvan Shores, and Venus.

The minority enrollment at Lake Placid High School is 63% of the student body (majority Hispanic), which is higher than the Florida state average of 61%.
