= Lake Placid, Florida =

Town in the state of Florida, United States

- Town
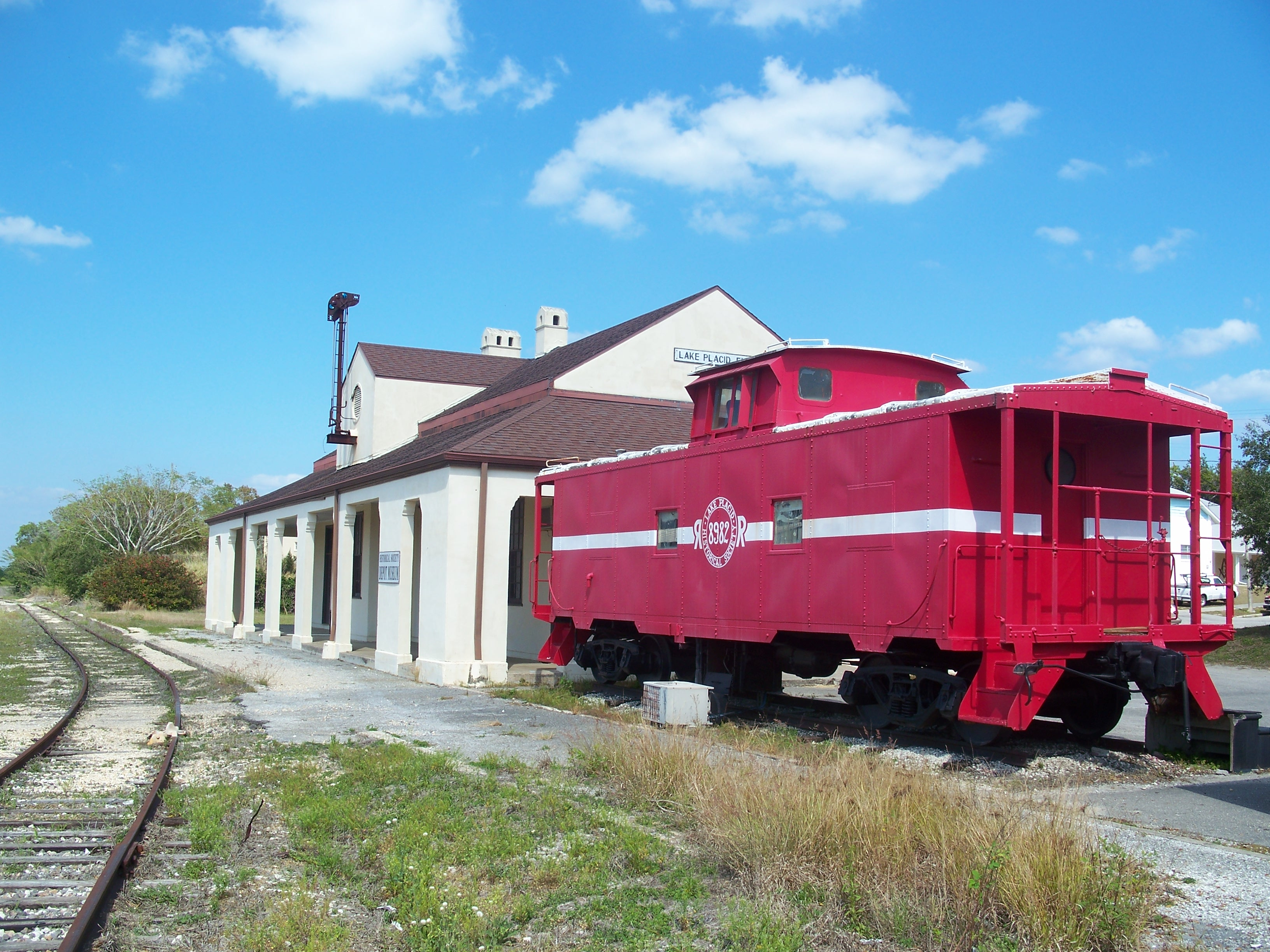
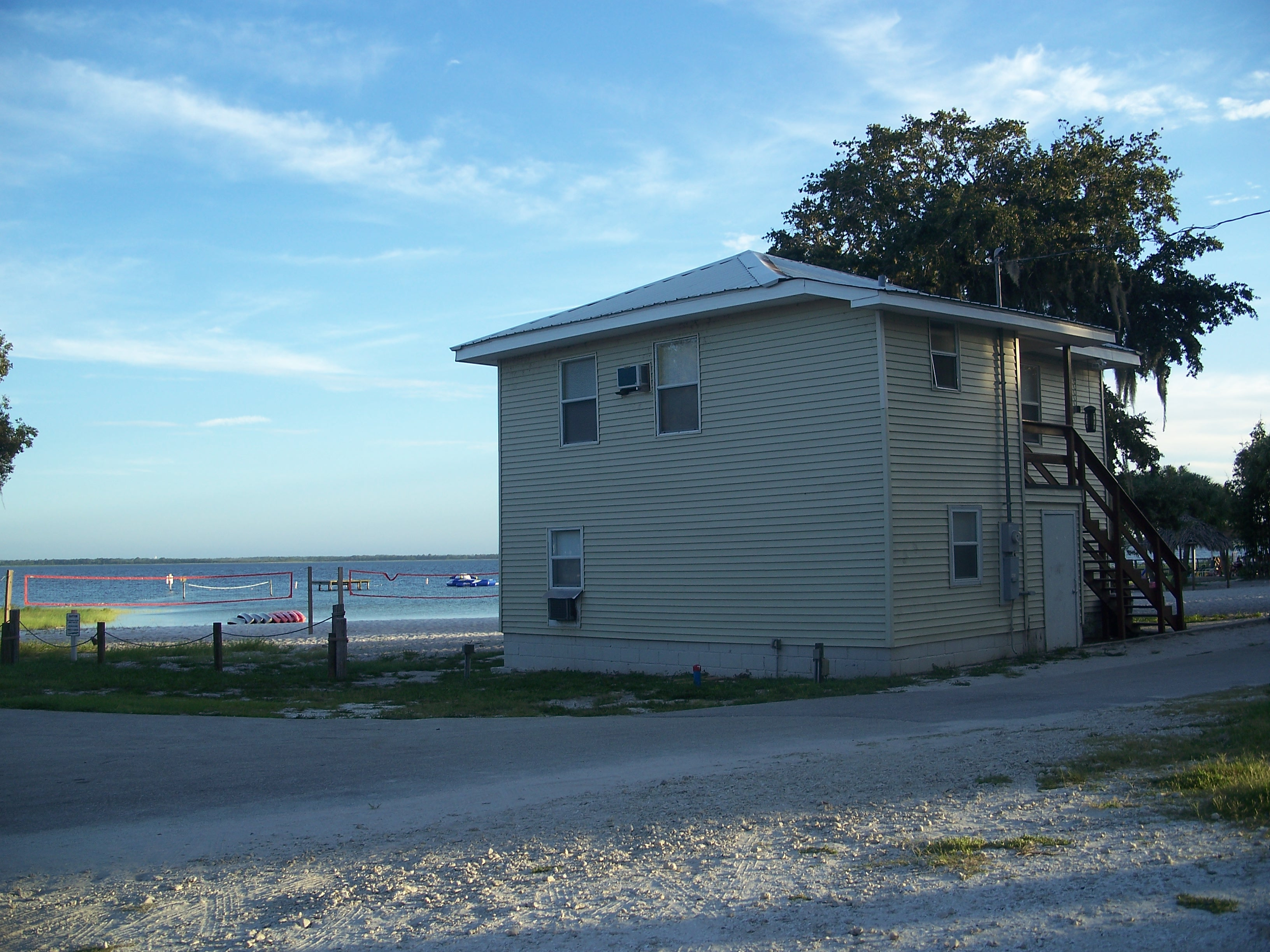
- left: Old Lake Placid Atlantic Coast Line Railroad Depot; right: Lake Placid Conference Center

- Logo
- Nicknames: "Caladium Capital of the World" "Town of Murals"
- Location in Highlands County and the state of Florida
- Coordinates: 27°18′01″N 81°22′25″W
- Country: United States
- State: Florida
- County: Highlands
- Settled (Wicco): c. 1869–1912
- Settled (Lake Stearns): February 5, 1919
- Incorporated (Town of Lake Stearns): December 1, 1925
- Reincorporated (Town of Lake Placid): June 6, 1927
- Named after: Lake Placid, New York

Government
  - Type: Mayor-Council
  - Mayor: Colleen Charles
  - Vice Mayor: Raymond Royce
  - Council Members: Joy Eberhardt, Greg Sapp, and Nell Frewin-Hays
  - Town Administrator: Kevin McCarthy
  - Town Clerk: Eva Cooper-Hapeman

Area
  - Total: 4.71 sq mi (12.21 km^{2})
  - Land: 4.66 sq mi (12.07 km^{2})
  - Water: 0.050 sq mi (0.13 km^{2}) 1.4%
- Elevation: 98 ft (30 m)

Population (2020)
  - Total: 2,360
  - Density: 506.3/sq mi (195.47/km^{2})
- Time zone: UTC-5 (Eastern (EST))
  - Summer (DST): UTC-4 (EDT)
- ZIP Codes: 33852, 33862
- Area code: 863
- FIPS code: 12-38625
- GNIS feature ID: 2405975
- Website: https://www.lakeplacidfl.net/

Lake Placid is a town in Highlands County, Florida, United States. It is part of the Sebring, Florida Metropolitan Statistical Area. As of the 2020 census, the population was 2,360, up from 2,223 at the 2010 census.

The town has two mottoes: "Town of Murals" and "Caladium Capital of the World". Lake Placid has 47 murals painted on buildings throughout the town, and 98 percent of the world's caladium bulbs come from Lake Placid. There are 14 caladium farms, spanning 1,200 acres, and these plants have been grown in the area since the 1940s. In 2013, Reader's Digest named Lake Placid America's Most Interesting Town.

The town is home to the Lake Placid Tower, a closed concrete block observation tower that is 240 feet (73 m) tall according to early sources or 270 feet (82 m) tall according to late sources. However, government sources exclude a 270-foot height, allowing only a 240-foot height.

== History ==
The area was first known as "Wicco" when the first recorded settler came in 1869, and later, in 1891, the first recorded homesteader arrived to the current town. But the population didn't grow significantly until 1912, when 75 homesteaders moved to the community, after the Enlarged Homestead Act of 1909, when the US Congress opened Florida lands and the Great Plains for homesteading. On February 5, 1919, once the first post office was built, the area was renamed "Lake Stearns", (after Marcellus Stearns, who was the U.S. Government Surveyor General at the time), because it was already the official name of the community's train stop for the Atlantic Coast Line Railroad. Thus, it was initially the "Town of Lake Stearns" when it was officially incorporated as a municipality on December 1, 1925. But at the suggestion of Dr. Melvil Dewey, the inventor of the Dewey Decimal System and the founder of the Lake Placid Club in Lake Placid, New York, he proposed that Lake Stearns change its name once again to "Lake Placid." On April 29, 1927, the Lake Stearns commissioners accepted Dr. Dewey's proposal. Subsequently, they submitted a request to the Florida State Legislature. On June 6, 1927, the community was chartered as the current Town of Lake Placid.

== Geography ==
The Town of Lake Placid is located in central Highlands County. U.S. Route 27 passes through the town, leading north 16 miles (26 km) to Sebring, the county seat, and south 58 miles (93 km) to Clewiston.

According to the United States Census Bureau, Lake Placid has a total area of 3.650 square miles (9.45 km^{2}), of which 3.599 square miles (9.32 km^{2}) are land and 0.051 square miles (0.13 km^{2}), or 1.4%, are water.

=== Climate ===
The climate in this area is characterized by hot, humid summers and generally mild winters. According to the Köppen climate classification, the Town of Lake Placid has a humid subtropical climate zone (Cfa).

== Demographics ==
Historical population
Census	Pop.	Note	%±
1930	582		—
1940	340		−41.6%
1950	417		22.6%
1960	1,007		141.5%
1970	656		−34.9%
1980	963		46.8%
1990	1,158		20.2%
2000	1,668		44.0%
2010	2,223		33.3%
2020	2,360		6.2%
U.S. Decennial Census

=== Racial and ethnic composition ===
Lake Placid racial composition (Hispanics excluded from racial categories) (NH = Non-Hispanic)
Race	Pop 2010	Pop 2020	% 2010	% 2020
White (NH)	991	1,108	44.58%	46.95%
Black or African American (NH)	150	174	6.75%	7.37%
Native American or Alaska Native (NH)	9	5	0.40%	0.21%
Asian (NH)	21	27	0.94%	1.14%
Pacific Islander or Native Hawaiian (NH)	2	0	0.09%	0.00%
Some other race (NH)	0	6	0.00%	0.25%
Two or more races/Multiracial (NH)	26	55	1.17%	2.33%
Hispanic or Latino (any race)	1,024	985	46.06%	41.74%
Total	2,223	2,360		

=== 2020 census ===
As of the 2020 census, Lake Placid had a population of 2,360. The median age was 41.3 years. 23.6% of residents were under the age of 18 and 23.9% of residents were 65 years of age or older. For every 100 females there were 93.1 males, and for every 100 females age 18 and over there were 90.0 males age 18 and over.

In 2020, 90.2% of residents lived in urban areas, while 9.8% lived in rural areas.

In 2020, there were 993 households in Lake Placid, of which 29.4% had children under the age of 18 living in them. Of all households, 36.7% were married-couple households, 21.0% were households with a male householder and no spouse or partner present, and 37.1% were households with a female householder and no spouse or partner present. About 37.7% of all households were made up of individuals and 23.8% had someone living alone who was 65 years of age or older.

In 2020, there were 1,231 housing units, of which 19.3% were vacant. The homeowner vacancy rate was 4.2% and the rental vacancy rate was 7.9%.

According to the 2020 American Community Survey (ACS) five-year estimates, there were 494 families residing in the town.

According to the American Community Survey, in 2016, 58.3% of households were family households – with one or more people related to the householder or related to one of a same-sex couple by birth, marriage or adoption; and 41.7% were non-family households – including same-sex couples with no other relatives. Family households included 29.0% with their own children under 18 years, 37.0% were a husband-wife family, 6.4% were a male householder with no wife present, 14.9% were a female householder with no husband present. Non-family households consisted of 12.2% males living alone – 5.8% 65 years and older – and 19.7% females living alone – 19.7% 65 years and older. The average household size was 2.63 and the average family size was 3.21. The median age of the population was 34.4 years.

From the 2016 American Community Survey, the population was spread out, with 10% under 5 years old, 15.3% from 5 to 14, 45.2% from 15 to 44, 20.9% from 45 to 64, and 16.1% who were 65 years of age or older (significant margins of error causes total to exceed 100%). The sex ratio was 106.3 males per 100 females. The educational attainment of the population who were a high school graduate or higher was 59.2%, while 12.3% had a bachelor's degree or higher. The poverty rate of the population 25 years and older was 61.0% if less than a high school graduate, 52.2% if a high school graduate, 26.8% with some college, and 13.4% with a bachelor's degree or higher. The median earnings of the population 25 years and over during the past 12 months was $14,938, consisting of $10,625 if less than a high school graduate, $15,187 if a high school graduate, $18,988 with some college, and $147,961 with a bachelor's degree. The per capita income was $17,318. 54.7% of all people had incomes below the poverty level. All figures from the survey had significant margins of error.

=== 2010 census ===
As of the 2010 United States census, there were 2,223 people, 833 households, and 575 families residing in the town.

=== 2000 census ===
As of the census of 2000, there are 1,668 people, 646 households, and 395 families residing in the town. The population density is 250.6/km^{2} (650.2/mi^{2}). There are 776 housing units at an average density of 116.6/km^{2} (302.5/mi^{2}). The racial makeup of the town is 76.38% White, 9.95% African American, 0.90% Native American, 0.66% Asian, 0.00% Pacific Islander, 10.43% from other races, and 1.68% from two or more races. 30.46% of the population are Hispanic or Latino of any race.

In 2000, there are 646 households out of which 29.6% have children under the age of 18 living with them, 44.9% are married couples living together, 11.9% have a female householder with no husband present, and 38.7% are non-families. 31.9% of all households are made up of individuals and 16.1% have someone living alone who is 65 years of age or older. The average household size is 2.57 and the average family size is 3.26.

In 2000, in the town the age distribution is 27.6% under the age of 18, 11.3% from 18 to 24, 25.2% from 25 to 44, 17.2% from 45 to 64, and 18.6% who are 65 years of age or older. The median age is 34 years. For every 100 females there are 97.4 males. For every 100 females age 18 and over, there are 92.7 males.

In 2000, the median income for a household in the town is $21,178, and the median income for a family is $28,194. Males have a median income of $21,629 versus $14,650 for females. The per capita income for the town is $11,855. 34.7% of the population and 22.7% of families are below the poverty line. Out of the total people living in poverty, 55.2% are under the age of 18 and 7.3% are 65 or older.

== Media ==
=== Television ===
Lake Placid is located in a fringe viewing area; its television stations originate in distant cities. Local television services offer signals from WFTV, the ABC affiliate in Orlando, WINK, the CBS affiliate in Fort Myers/Naples, WFLA, the Tampa Bay area NBC affiliate, and WTVT, the Tampa Bay area Fox affiliate. There are no TV stations whose studios or broadcasting towers are located in Lake Placid.

=== Radio ===
Lake Placid is part of the Sebring radio market, which is ranked as the 288th largest in the United States by Arbitron. It is the city of license for WWTK 730 kHz and is in that station's primary coverage area, however, there are no radio stations whose studios or broadcasting towers are located in Lake Placid.

=== Newspapers ===
The Highlands News-Sun, a Sebring-based newspaper published daily, is currently the only commercial newspaper circulating in Lake Placid. The Journal, a locally based weekly publication, had circulated for almost 60 years in Lake Placid, but ceased publication.

== Points of interest ==
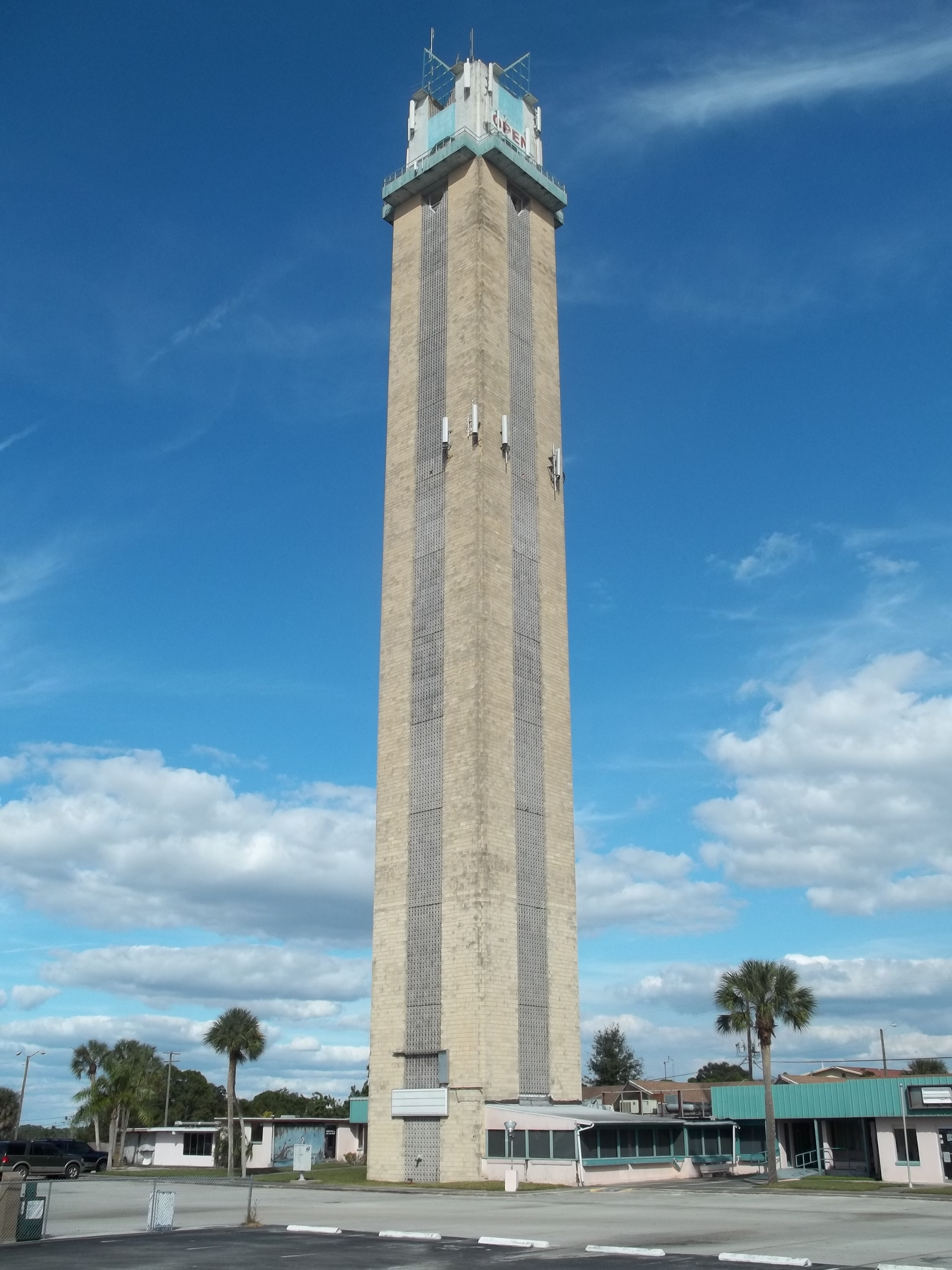
Lake Placid Tower

=== Lake Placid Tower ===
The structure, built by Ridge Builders, and previously called the Happiness Tower, is a closed concrete block observation tower located on US Highway 27. It is 240 feet (73.2 m) tall according to early sources (before 1982), although later sources (after 1986) have indicated that it is 270 feet (82.3 m) tall. Because its antennae are 392 feet (119.5 m) above sea level, and it rests on ground 142 feet (43 m) above sea level (392–142=250), only the 240-foot architectural height is plausible. It has three observation levels, at 192 feet (58.5 m) behind windows, at 200 feet (61.0 m) on a balcony, and at 225 feet (68.6 m) atop the elevator shaft. It was designed by architect A. Wynn Howell of Lakeland, built in 1960, and opened January 1, 1961. It was the tallest concrete block structure in the world when it opened.

For years, the tower was open to tourists who could take a 65 second elevator ride to the observation deck. Because of sluggish sales, the tower closed in 2003 and is now a cell phone tower.

=== Historical Society Depot Museum ===
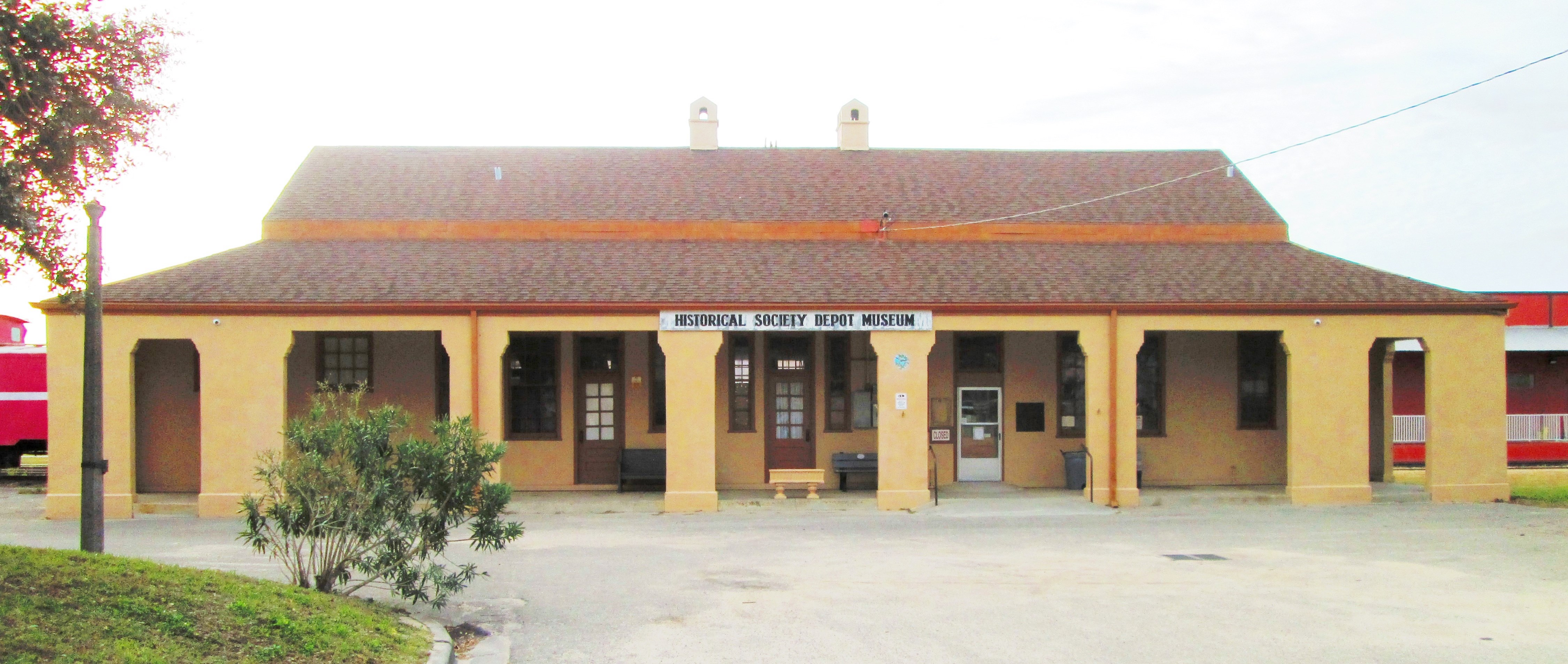
The Old Lake Placid Atlantic Coast Line Railroad Depot is listed on the National Register of Historic Places.

The Old Lake Placid Atlantic Coast Line Railroad Depot, now the Historical Society Depot Museum of the Lake Placid Historical Society, is a historic Atlantic Coast Line Railroad depot in Lake Placid, Florida. It is located at 12 East Park Street and is listed on the National Register of Historic Places.

=== Wall murals ===
There are 51 large murals on the sides of buildings in Lake Placid's "uptown" area. These have become a tourist attraction. The Welcome Center sells a booklet with a map of the murals that provides specifics about the history that each one depicts, as well as information about the artist(s).

The murals were planned in 1992, by Harriet and Bob Porter, and were painted in subsequent years by various artists, most depicting the history of the area. Some feature the trompe-l'œil technique.

=== Toby's American Clown Museum and School ===
Lake Placid is home to the American Clown Museum and School, which was founded in 1993. Here more than 700 significant pieces of clown memorabilia can be found.

== Education ==
All public schools are served by The School Board of Highlands County.

The Lake Placid High School is located in the town.

== Sister cities ==
- Lake Placid, New York, United States of America
- Lompoc, California, United States of America
