= Lake Placid station (Florida) =

- Old Lake Placid Atlantic Coast Line Railroad Depot
- U.S. National Register of Historic Places
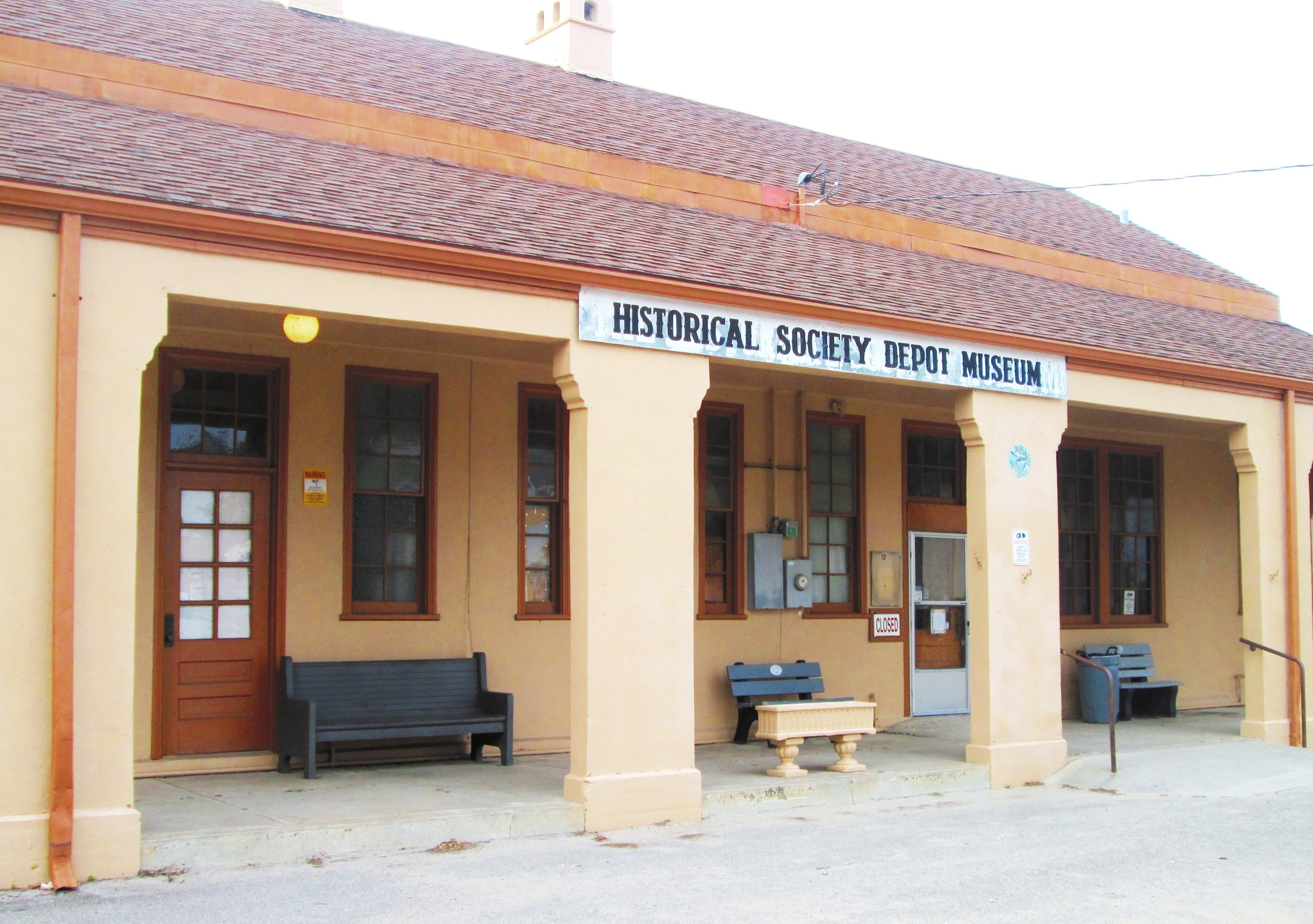
- The museum in 2018

- Location within Florida
- Location: 12 East Park St. Lake Placid, Florida
- Coordinates: 27°17′52″N 81°22′6″W
- Built: 1927
- Architectural style: Masonry Vernacular
- NRHP reference No.: 92001733
- Added to NRHP: January 4, 1993

The Old Lake Placid Atlantic Coast Line Railroad Depot, now the Historical Society Depot Museum of the Lake Placid Historical Society, is a historic Atlantic Coast Line Railroad depot in Lake Placid, Florida. It is located at 12 East Park Street.

The station was completed in 1927, but only served passengers until the mid-1950s. Freight trains continued to use the line until the 1970s. On January 4, 1993, it was added to the National Register of Historic Places.

== Gallery ==
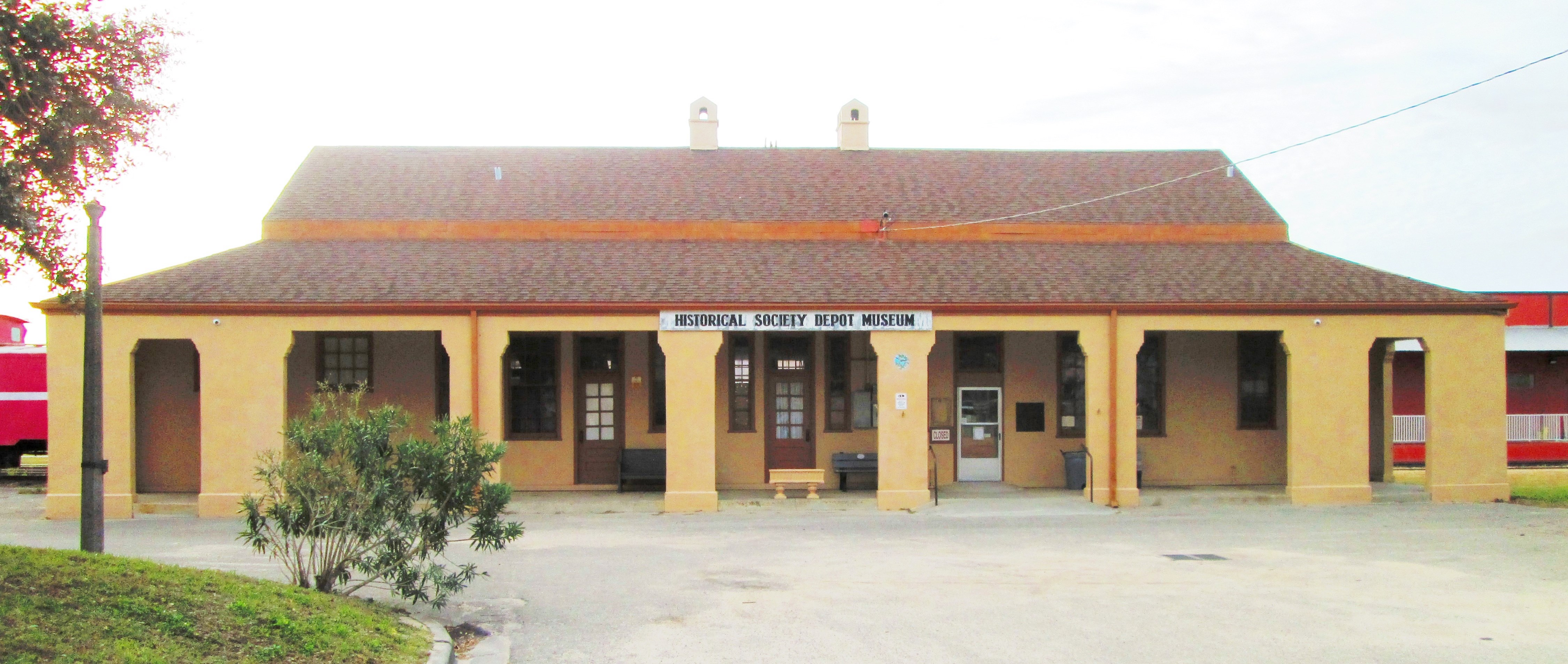
The front of the depot

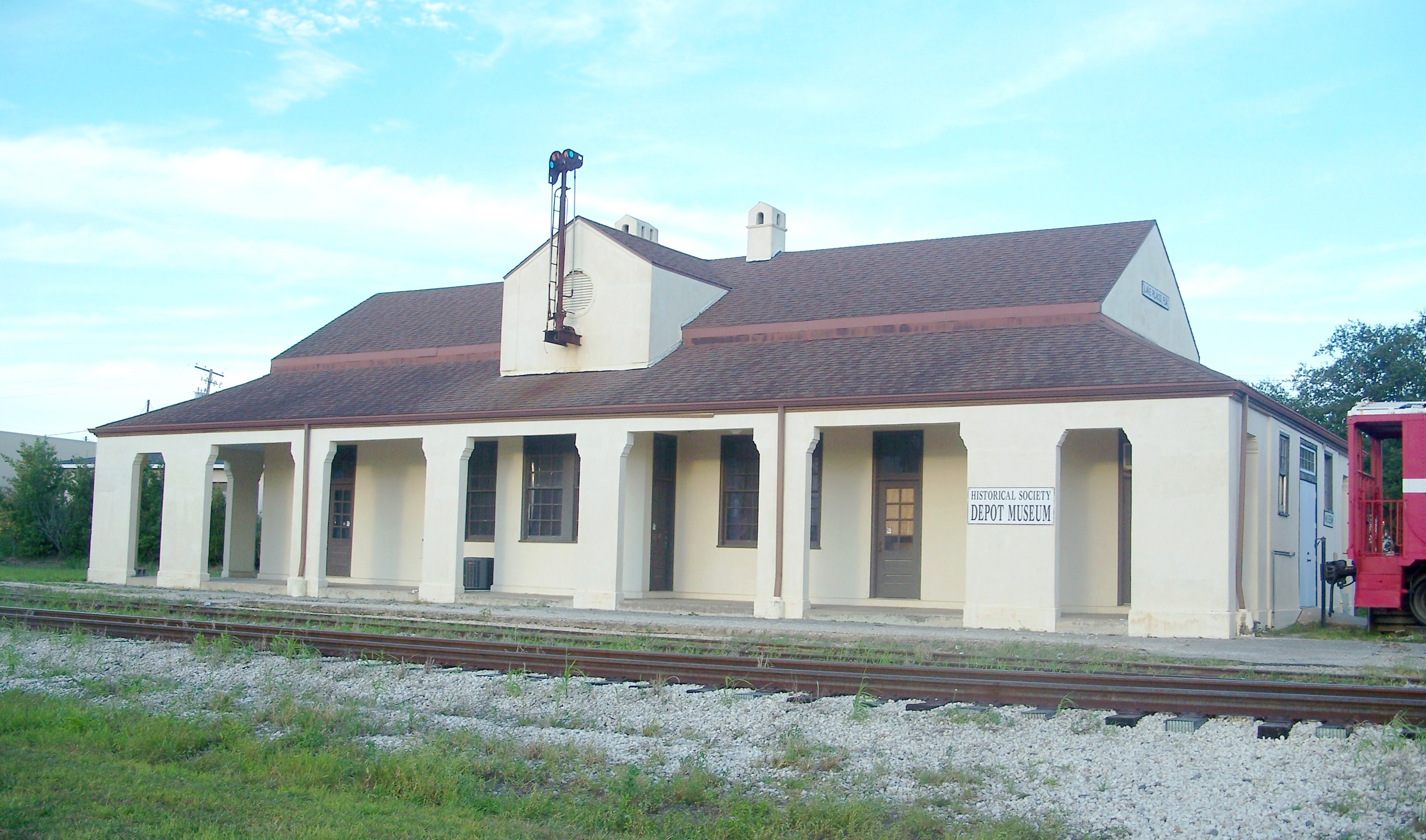
The platform side of the depot

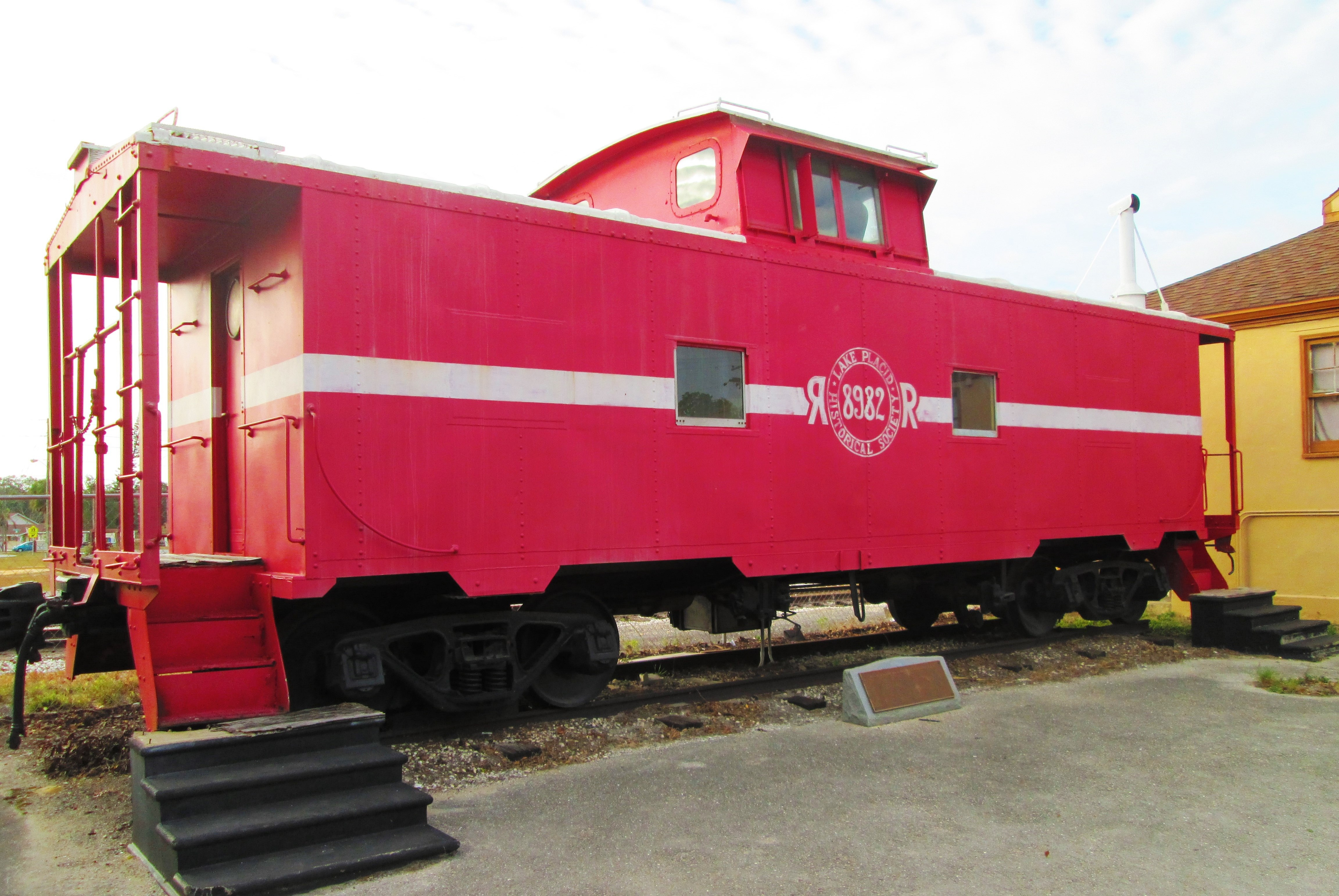
A caboose at the depot museum

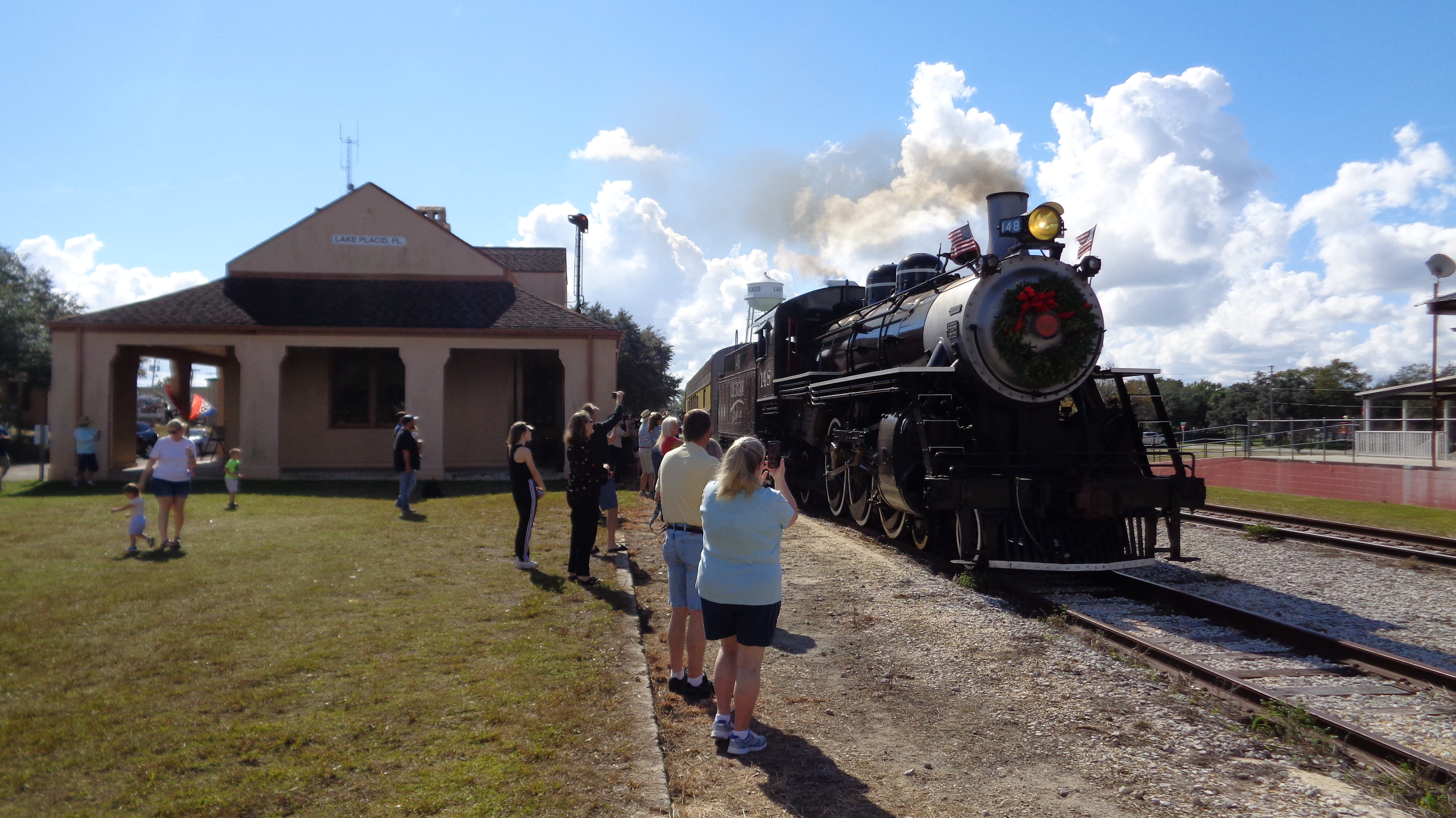
A Sugar Express excursion train arriving at the depot museum

== See also ==
- South Central Florida Express

Preceding station	Atlantic Coast Line Railroad	Following station
Istokpoga toward Haines City	Haines City – Everglades City	Hicoria toward Everglades City
