= Florida Citrus Tower =

Tower in Clermont, Florida

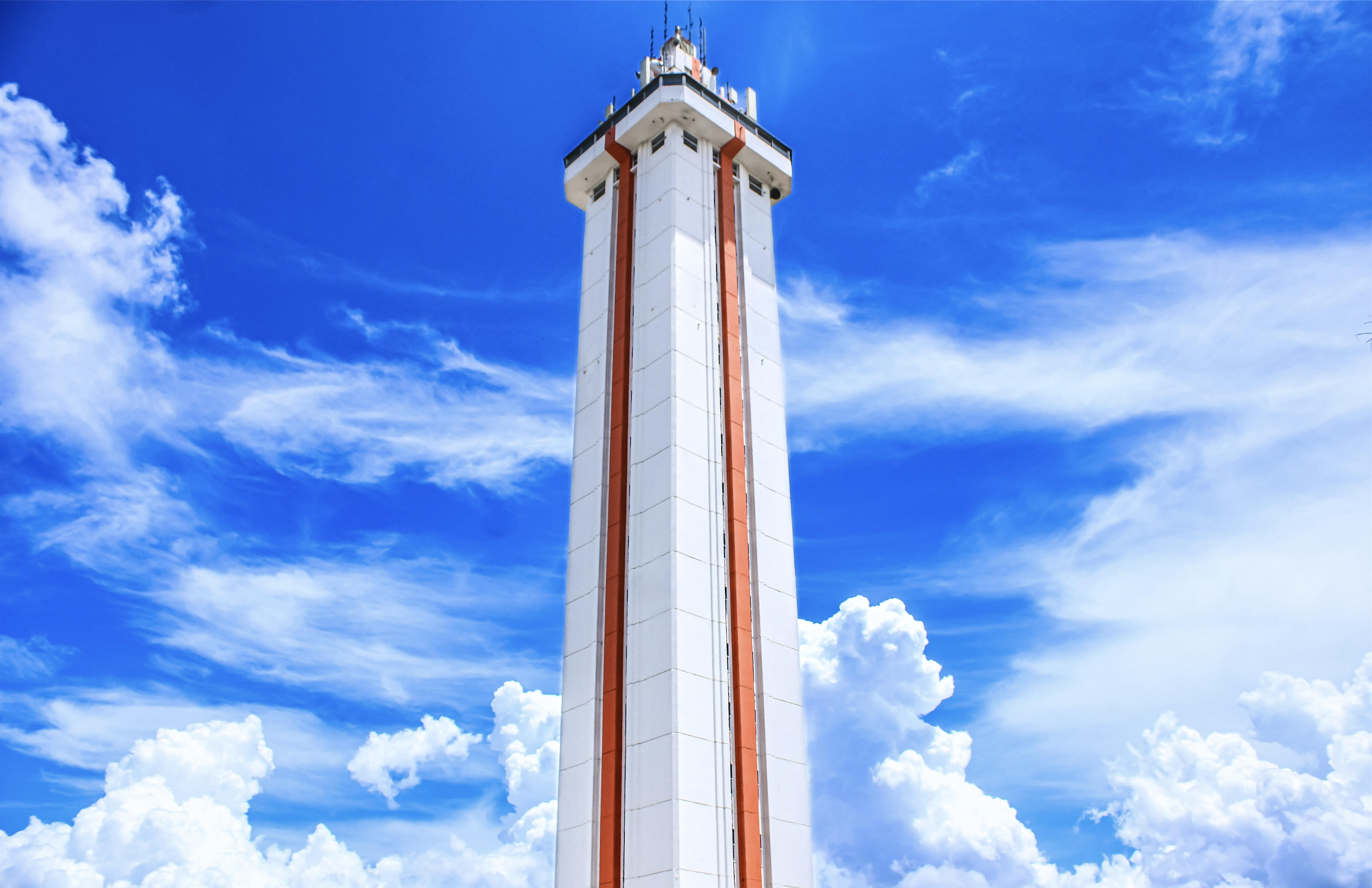
- The tower in 2024
- Interactive map of Florida Citrus Tower

General information
- Type: observation tower; radio broadcasting tower
- Location: Clermont, Florida
- Coordinates: 28°33′50″N 81°44′35″W
- Elevation: 228 feet (69.5 m) above sea level at its base
- Completed: 1956; 70 years ago
- Owner: Ralph Messer

Height
- Antenna spire: 500 feet (152.4 m) above sea level
- Roof: 226 feet (68.9 m) above ground

Design and construction
- Developer: A.W.Thacker and F.J.Toole

The Florida Citrus Tower is a 226-foot-tall (69 m) structure in Clermont, Florida. Built in 1956 to allow visitors to observe the miles of surrounding orange groves, it was once among the most famous landmarks of the Orlando area.

== History ==
The tower was conceived by A.W. Thacker and Jack Toole "to showcase the thriving citrus industry," Orlando Weekly wrote in 2005. Construction began in 1955, funded by a public sale of stock in the project. The project consumed 5 million pounds (2,300 t) of concrete and 149,000 pounds (68 t) of reinforcing steel.

The tower opened on July 14, 1956, with representatives from Silver Springs and Cypress Gardens in attendance. During the first several years of operation, the tower drew up to 500,000 visitors a year, thanks to its location on US 27 between Cypress Gardens and Silver Springs. However, in 1964 Florida's Turnpike was extended north, providing a faster route south through Central Florida. Since then, the tower has been sold several times. In the 1980s, three harsh freezes (1983, 1985, and 1989) killed most of the citrus groves in Lake County; this caused a decrease in visitation to the tower. In 1988, a tram was built to offer visitors tours of various citrus crops. The tower was purchased in 1995 by Greg Homan, who had it painted white and turquoise.

In April 2015, the Citrus Tower was repainted in its original color scheme, with orange and white stripes. In 2022, the Homan family sold the tower to Simchat Torah Beit Midrash (STBM) for $3.3 million. It reopened in May 2023 after a renovation that aimed to "bring it back to what it was years and years ago". The Jewish influence in the region was partly driven by the fruitful development of Israeli agtech companies in Florida.

== Attraction ==
The Citrus Tower includes a coin drop where visitors can hear their coin drop to the bottom. At the lobby is ROOM: Valencia: a banquet facility, gift shop, and museum of the tower's history. Near the tower is the Presidents Hall of Fame, with wax tributes to the Presidents of the United States and a model of the interior of the White House.

== Gallery ==
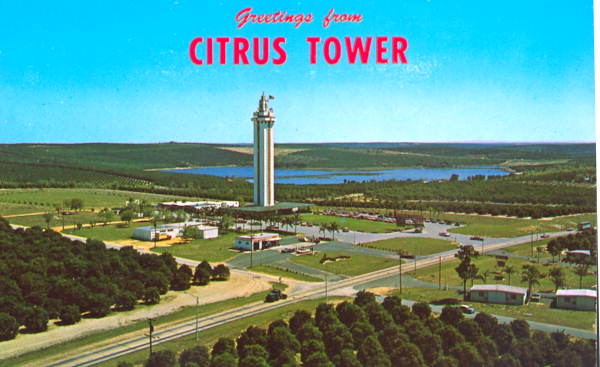
"Greetings from Citrus Tower" postcard from circa 1960

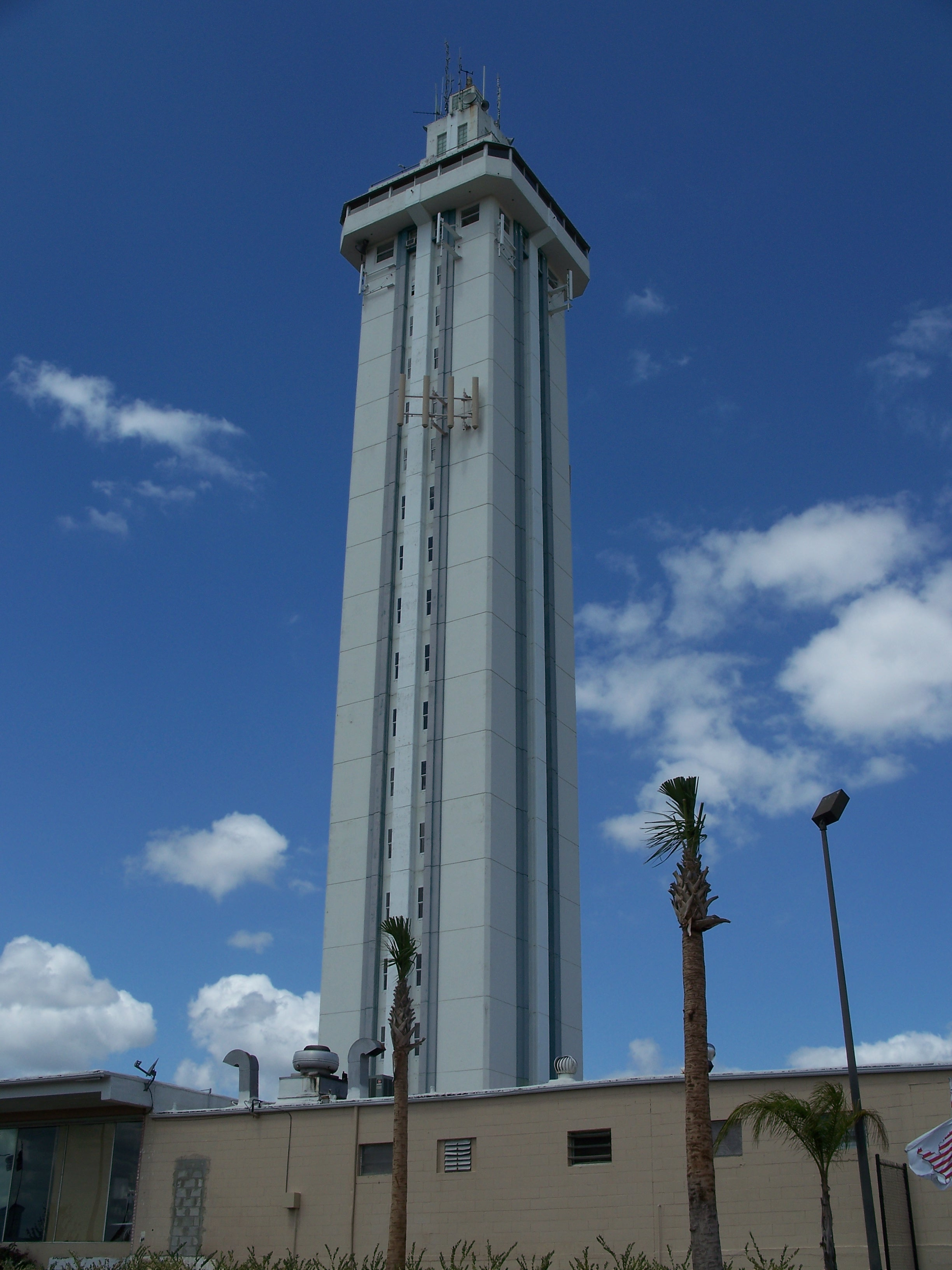
The Citrus Tower in 2007

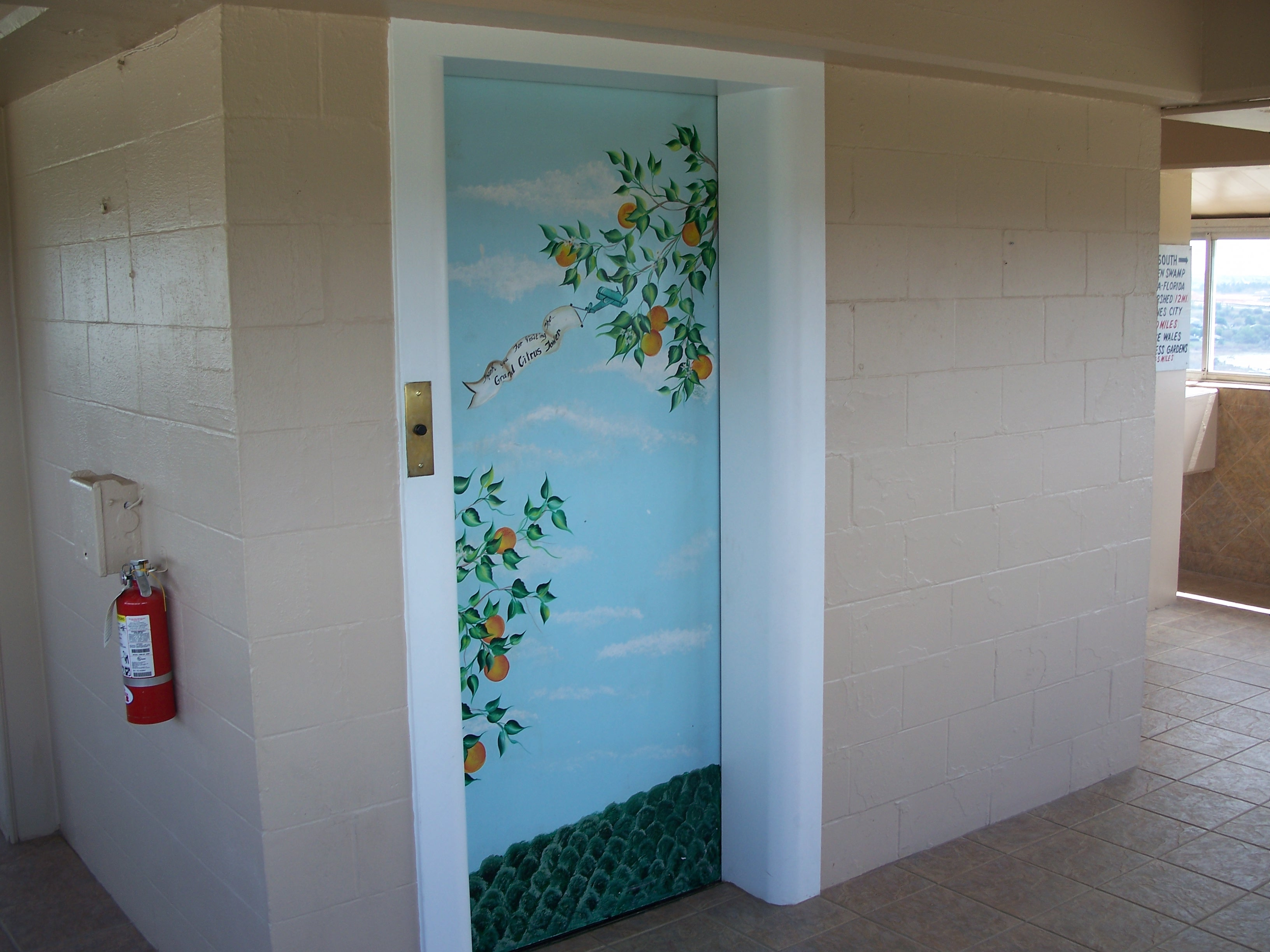
Elevator door of the Citrus Tower (March, 2007)

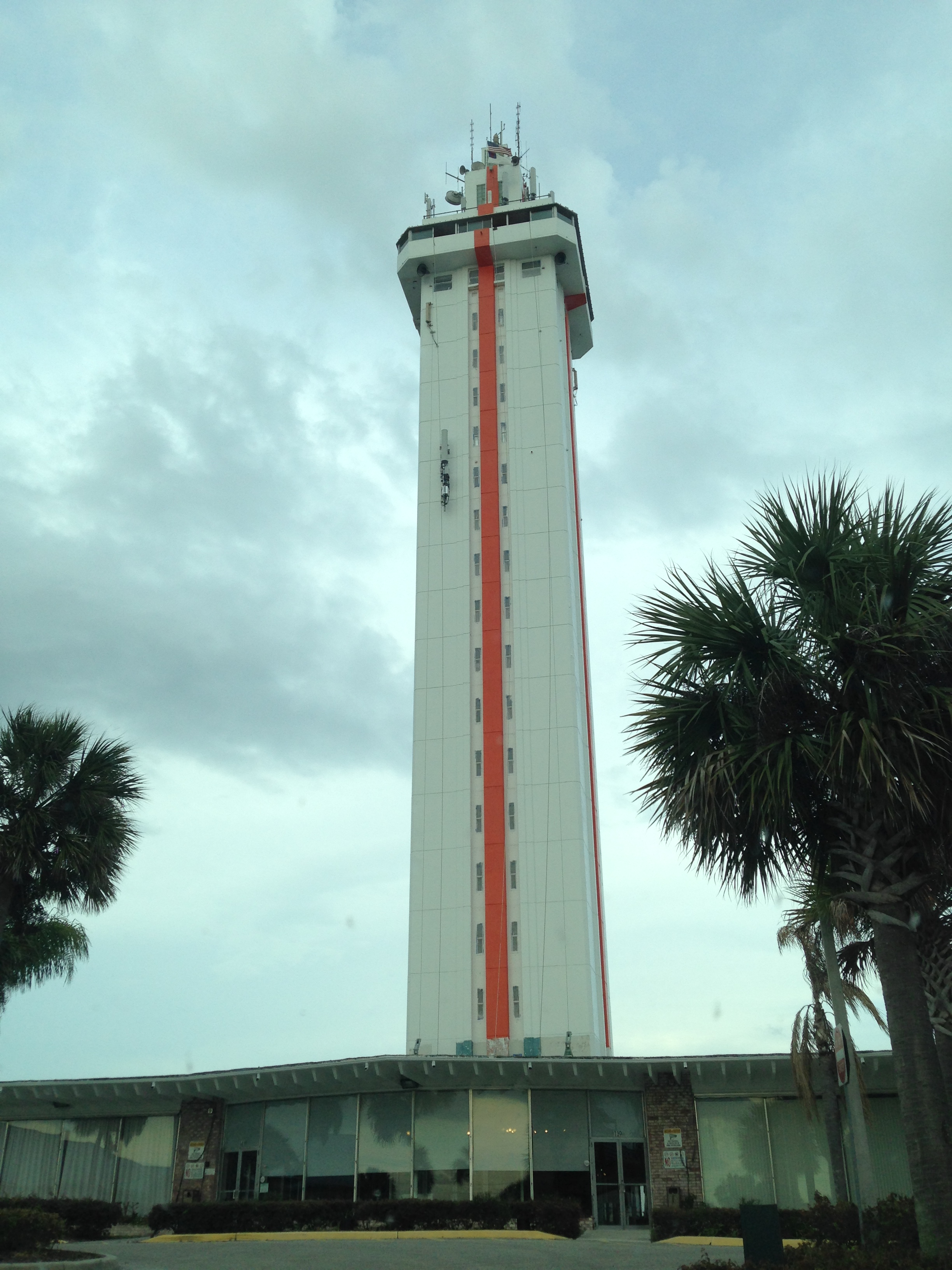
The Citrus Tower in 2015

== See also ==
- Bok Tower Gardens
- Lake Placid Tower
- Agriculture in Florida
