= Lake Placid Conference Center =

Coordinates: 27.2647°N 81.3701°W

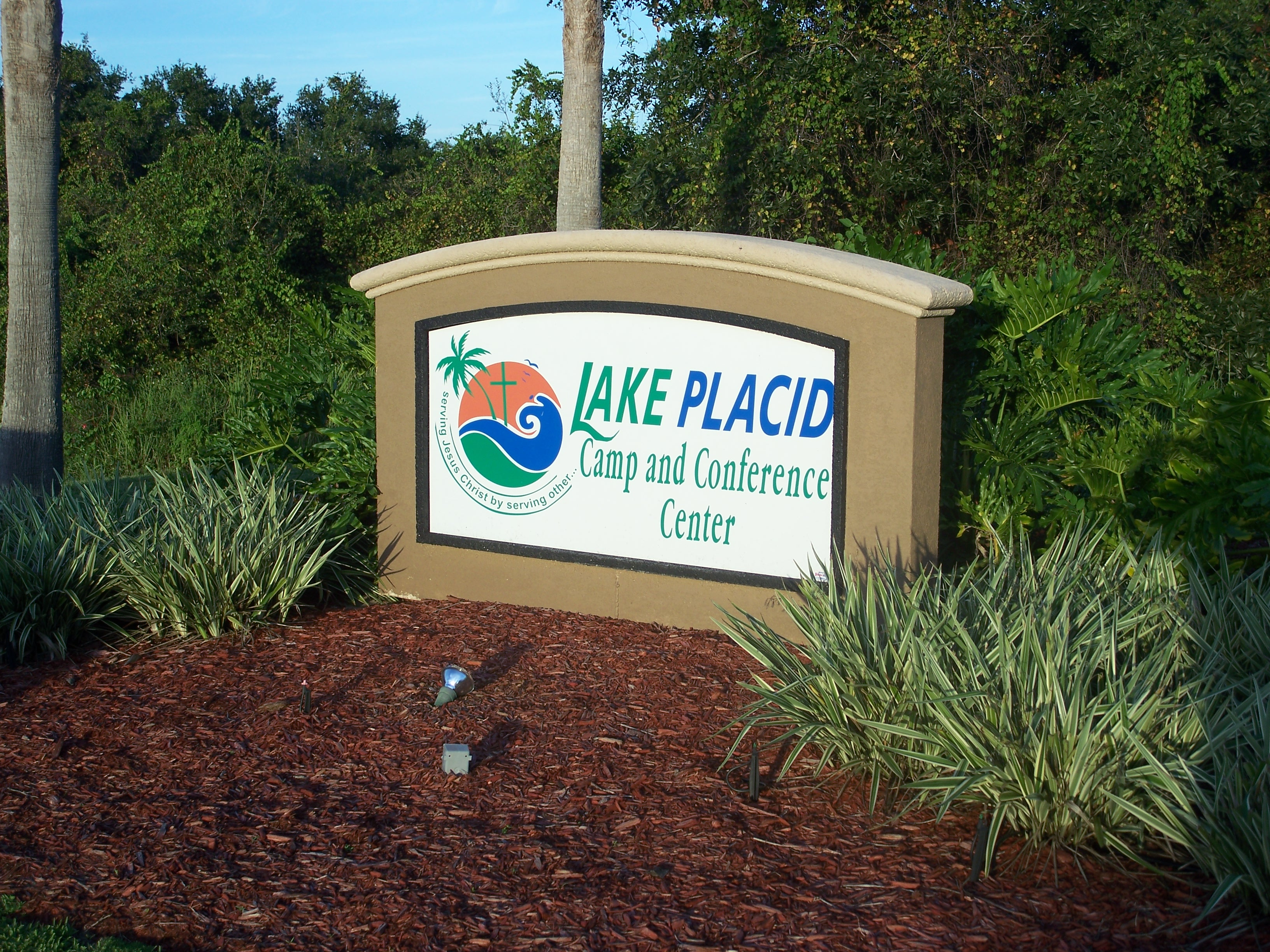
Entrance sign

The Lake Placid Camp & Conference Center is located in Lake Placid, Florida, and is owned and operated by the South Florida District Church of the Nazarene. The Nazarene district purchased the property in October 1996, for the purpose of providing a Christian place for Christian groups, and churches to come together to worship God in a camp type setting.

== About ==
The conference center sits on 64 acres (260,000 m^{2}) directly on Lake Placid and provides room to house 350 guests currently with more housing in the construction process. There are currently 14 multi-bed dorm, cabin, and private guest buildings available to house the guests in. A dining area in the main lodge provides a place for guests to enjoy the meals provided in their contracted packages. The conference center has several meeting rooms available to groups, along with a basketball/tennis court, a sand volleyball area, a playground, and shuffleboard court for their guest’s enjoyment. There is also a beach area on the lake, and a swimming area marked off in the lake for LPCC guests to use. Picnic tables and park benches can be found throughout the grounds for the enjoyment of those who like to commune with nature.

== History of the property ==
Two of the buildings on the campground, the Lodge, (originally known as the Litlloj) and the Inn, boast a long and interesting history being built in 1927, originally belonging to Melvil Dewey, as a summer resort for his family and friends to enjoy. Dewey is credited with convincing the town council to rename the Lake, (and sub sequentially the town), from Lake Stearns to Lake Placid after the town of Lake Placid, New York, where his main residence was located. He is also credited with being the person responsible for bringing the railroad to Lake Placid, Florida. Dewey, an educator, and librarian, is known as the creator of the "Dewey Decimal Classification" system, and "the father of modern librarianship".

== Credits ==
"Yesterday in Florida" issue 14, Lake Placid Conference Center historical files
