= Lake Placid Tower =

Closed observation tower in Florida

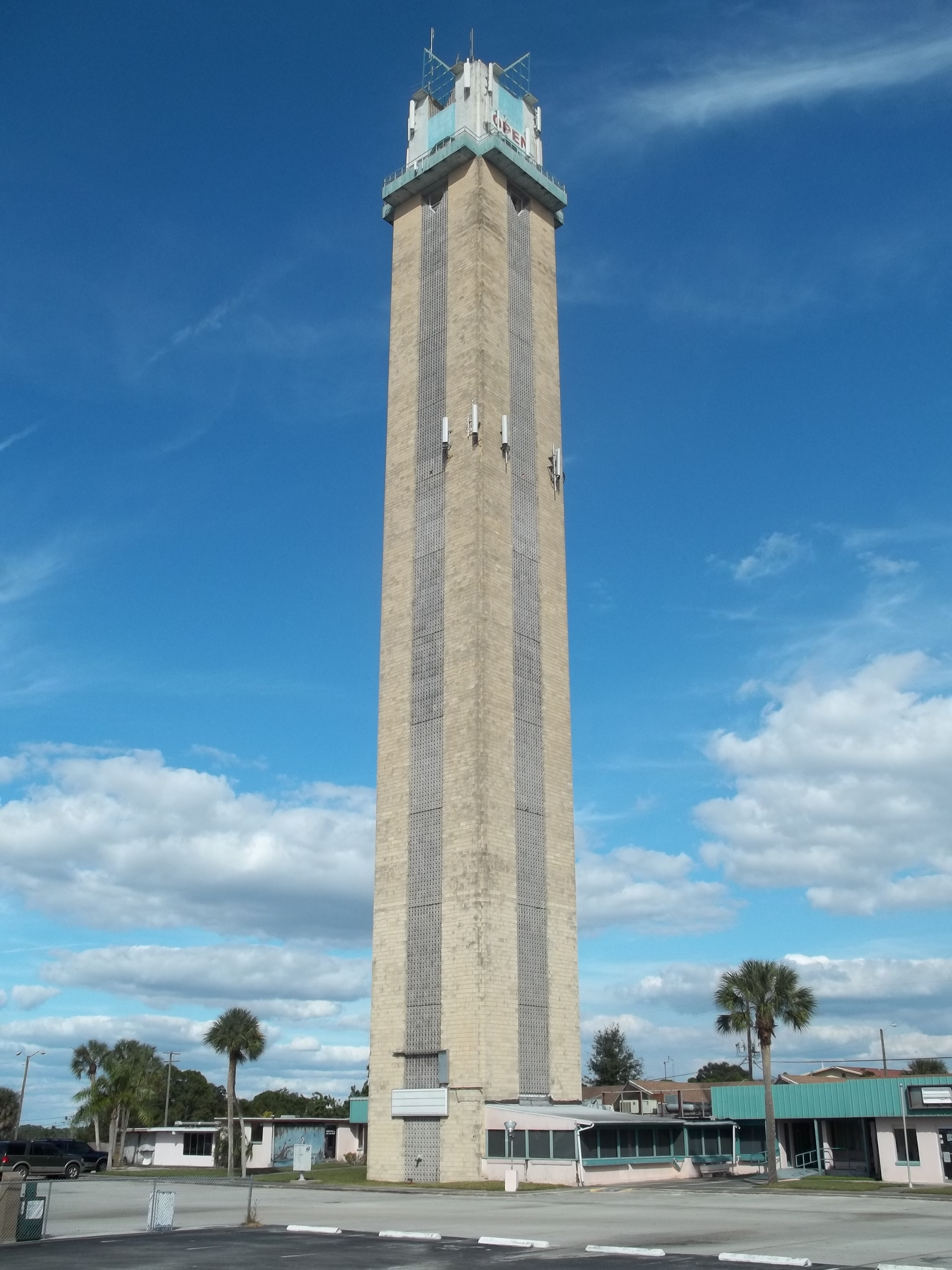
- Southwest corner

- Location within Florida
- Former names: Placid Tower; Tower of Peace; Happiness Tower

General information
- Status: Abandoned
- Type: Observation tower
- Location: 467 US HWY 27 N, Lake Placid, Florida
- Coordinates: 27°18′3.7″N 81°21′26.1″W
- Elevation: 142 feet (43 m)
- Construction started: 1960
- Construction stopped: 1960
- Opened: January 1, 1961
- Closed: c. November 6, 2003
- Cost: $350,000 (equivalent to $2,800,000 in 2024)
- Owner: CHL Tower Group

Height
- Architectural: 240 feet (73 m)
- Tip: 250 feet (76 m)
- Observatory: 225 feet (68.6 m); 200 feet (61.0 m); 192 feet (58.5 m)

Dimensions
- Diameter: 25 feet 4 inches (7.72 m) square

Technical details
- Material: Concrete block Limestone tile Reinforced concrete
- Lifts/elevators: 1
- Grounds: 2.27 acres (0.92 ha)

Design and construction
- Architect: A. Wynn Howell
- Developer: Air View Corporation (Earnest Oakley Hunt and Robert Gray)
- Main contractor: Ridge Builders

The Lake Placid Tower in Lake Placid, Florida, formerly named Placid Tower, Tower of Peace or Happiness Tower, is a closed observation tower 240 feet (73.2 m) tall according to early sources (before 1982) or 270 feet (82.3 m) tall according to late sources (after 1986). However, no physical modification of the tower occurred in the interim that would explain a 30-foot increase in height.

== History ==
Earnest Oakley Hunt dreamed of building an observation tower when he moved to Orlando in 1938, then moved to Sebring in 1947 and found the perfect location in nearby Lake Placid. He and Robert Gray formed Air View Corporation to build the tower. The tower was designed by architect A. Wynn Howell of Lakeland, built by Ridge Builders of Sebring in 1960 for $350,000 (equivalent to $2,800,000 in 2024), and opened January 1, 1961. Most sources state that it was the tallest concrete block structure in the world when it opened, with 90,000 concrete blocks, but the magazine Florida Architect states that it was built of reinforced concrete. One source states that the tower included 100,000 limestone blocks from Ocala while another states that it was faced with ceramic tile, implying that the tower has a facade of limestone tile.

Because of low ticket sales, the tower closed in 1982 when the owner would not pay their Internal Revenue Service taxes, but it was re-opened in 1986. The small group of owners still faced sluggish sales, and the tower and its restaurant continued to struggle, despite features such as a petting zoo in its plaza, and a pay phone at the top billed as the "highest pay phone in Florida." The last owner who operated the tower as a tourist attraction was Lake Placid Tower Group owned by Mark Cambell since 1992. Campbell purchased the tower and property from Barnett Bank for $240,000.00. He sold it to CHL Tower Group on November 6, 2003 which operated it as a cell phone tower until 2019. Even though the tower closed about 2003, it still has two red "OPEN" signs at its top, facing north and south.

The Tower View restaurant at the base of the tower closed in 2015. The tower has been abandoned since 2020.

As of June 2022, the tower is home to T-Mobile 5G cellular service and amateur radio communications by the Highlands County Amateur Radio Club W4HCA.

By 2025, all telecommunitcations equipment was unistalled. The "OPEN" signs have been removed. The surrounding plaza is in disrepair and is on the market for sale as of July 2026.

== Description ==
It rests on ground 142 feet (43 m) above sea level (NAVD 88). As a warning to aircraft, the top of the tower, including antennae, is stated to be 392 feet (119.5 m) above sea level by the Federal Aviation Administration (FAA). Thus, the height of the tower above ground, including antennae, is 250 feet (76.2 m) (392–142=250), which excludes a 270-foot architectural height, allowing only a 240-foot architectural height. Counting the tower's 8-inch (20.3 cm) courses yields a height above ground of 235–236 feet (71.6–71.9 m), so the lowest few feet of the 240-foot height, those resting on the foundation, are underground, providing space for an elevator pit.

According to early sources, it has three observation levels, at 192 feet (58.5 m) behind windows, at 200 feet (61.0 m) on an open air balcony, and at 225 feet (68.6 m) in the open air crow's nest, Eagle's Nest, or Bird's eye vantage point on top of the elevator shaft but below roof tracery. The apex of the tower is a flashing red aircraft warning light.

The tower is 360 feet (110 m) above sea level according to two late sources, the latter stating that that elevation applies to the eagle's nest, which is consistent with the crow's nest elevation of early sources (142+225=367≈360). The tower offered a 40-mile (65 km) panoramic view.

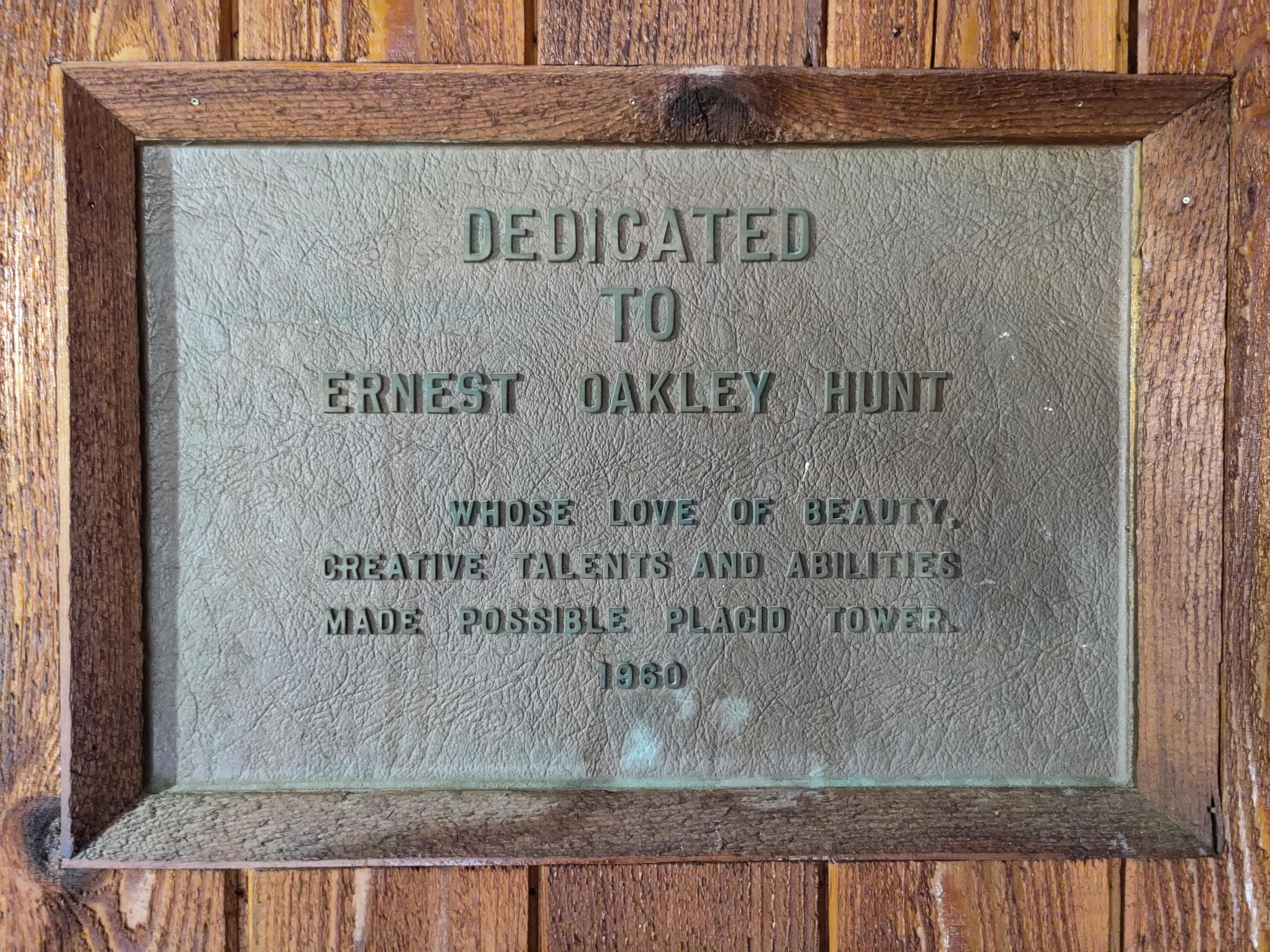
Commemorative plaque dedicated to Ernest Oakley Hunt. Located inside adjacent building at base of tower.

The tower below the balcony is 25 feet 4 inches (7.72 m) square, with its four vertical corners replaced by grooves (each 8 inches (20 cm) per side). The section above the balcony is 21 feet (6.40 m) square, also with corner grooves. Each wall is divided into vertical thirds. The outer thirds are composed of reinforced concrete blocks with a facade of limestone tile. The middle thirds are composed of decorative breeze or fence concrete blocks, which can only support themselves. The tower has a foundation made from 520 cubic yards (400 m^{3}) of concrete reinforced with 80,000 pounds (36,000 kg) of steel. The tracery atop the tower is made of gold anodized aluminum.

Originally, the tower above the balcony had the same basic design scheme as that below it. But after the tower closed, the portion of the tower from the balcony up was redesigned with a white and cyan (blue-green) color scheme. The limestone tile of the outer thirds of the walls was covered with white stucco, and the middle thirds were covered with thin cyan-colored panels which blocked the bird's eye view. These panels covered the two opposing triangular openings (top and bottom) in the middle third of each wall and the breeze or fence blocks between them. The roof tracery above and the balcony below them were also painted cyan.

The tower is among 35 designated Lake Placid historic structures. It is one of three towers in Central Florida, including the Citrus Tower, built in 1956, 100 miles (160 km) to the north in Clermont, and Bok Tower, built in 1929, 50 miles (80 km) to the north in Lake Wales.
